= Japanese submarine I-2 =

Imperial Japanese Navy J1 type cruiser submarine

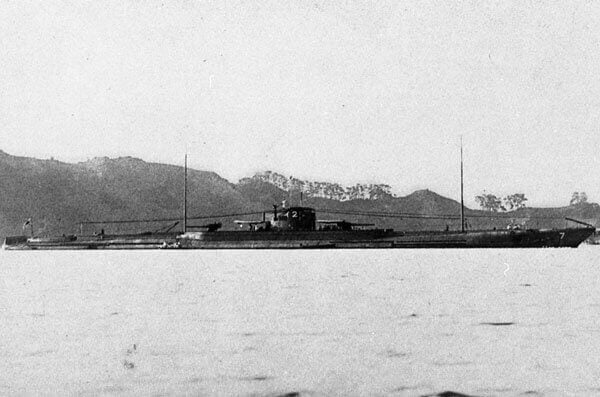

History

Imperial Japanese Navy
- Name: Submarine cruiser No. 75
- Builder: Kawasaki Shipbuilding Corporation, Kobe, Japan
- Laid down: 6 August 1923
- Renamed: I-2 on 1 November 1924
- Launched: 23 February 1925
- Completed: 24 July 1926
- Commissioned: 24 July 1926
- Decommissioned: 15 November 1929
- Recommissioned: 15 November 1930
- Decommissioned: 1 October 1935
- Recommissioned: 1 December 1936
- Decommissioned: 15 November 1939
- Recommissioned: 31 July 1941
- Fate: Sunk by USS Saufley, 7 April 1944
- Stricken: 10 June 1944
- Fate: Sunk 7 April 1944

General characteristics
- Class & type: J1 type submarine
- Displacement: 2,135 tons (surfaced); 2,791 tons (submerged)
- Length: 320 ft (98 m)
- Beam: 30 ft (9.1 m)
- Draught: 16.5 ft (5.0 m)
- Propulsion: twin shaft MAN 10 cylinder 4 stroke diesels giving 6000 bhp two electric motors of 2600 ehp
- Speed: 18 kn (33 km/h; 21 mph) (surfaced) 8 kn (15 km/h; 9.2 mph) (submerged)
- Range: 24,400 nmi (45,200 km; 28,100 mi) at 10 kn (19 km/h; 12 mph)
- Test depth: 80 m (262 ft)
- Complement: 68 officers and men
- Armament: two 140mm/40 caliber deck guns (one each fore and aft); (in January 1943 the after gun was replaced with a 46 foot Daihatsu barge); 6 × 533mm torpedo tubes; 20 × Type 95 oxygen-driven torpedoes

I-2 was an Imperial Japanese Navy J1 type cruiser submarine commissioned in 1926. She served in the Second Sino-Japanese War and World War II. During the latter conflict she operated in support of the attack on Pearl Harbor, conducted anti-shipping patrols in the Indian Ocean, supported the Indian Ocean raid, and took part in the Aleutian Islands campaign, the Guadalcanal campaign, Operation Ke, and the New Guinea campaign before she was sunk in April 1944.

== Construction and commissioning ==
Built by Kawasaki at Kobe, Japan, I-2 was laid down on 6 August 1923 with the name Submarine Cruiser No. 75. While she was on the building ways, she was renamed I-2 on 1 November 1924. She was launched on 23 February 1925 and was completed and commissioned on 24 July 1926.

== Service history ==
=== 1926–1937 ===
Upon commissioning, I-2 was assigned to the Yokosuka Naval District, and she moved from Kobe to Yokosuka before the end of July 1926. On 1 August 1926, she and her sister ship I-1 were assigned to Submarine Division 7 in Submarine Squadron 2 in the 2nd Fleet, a component of the Combined Fleet. On 1 July 1927, the division was reassigned to the Yokosuka Defense Division in the Yokosuka Naval District, and on 15 September 1927 it returned to duty in Submarine Squadron 2 in the 2nd Fleet.

On 15 November 1929, I-2 was decommissioned and placed in reserve. While in reserve, she underwent modernization, in which her German-made diesel engines and entire battery installation were replaced. With the work completed, she was recommissioned on 15 November 1930, and on 30 November 1929 Submarine Division 7 again was assigned to the Yokosuka Defense Division in the Yokosuka Naval District.

On 1 August 1930, Submarine Division 7 began an assignment to Submarine Squadron 1 in the 1st Fleet, a component of the Combined Fleet, The division was reassigned to the Yokosuka Defense Division in the Yokosuka Naval District on 1 October 1931, but it began another tour of duty in Submarine Squadron 1 in the 1st Fleet on 1 December 1931. It completed this assignment on 1 October 1932 and again was assigned to the Yokosuka Defense Division in the Yokosuka Naval District, then returned to Submarine Squadron 1 in the 1st Fleet for a third time on 15 November 1933. The German naval attaché to Japan, Kapitän zur See Paul Wenneker, toured I-2 between 14:50 and 15:40 on 10 January 1935 while she was tied up at Yokosuka.

I-2 got underway from Sasebo, Japan, in company with the other vessels of Submarine Squadron 1 — I-1 and I-3 of Submarine Division 7 and I-4, I-5, and I-6 of Submarine Division 8 — for a training cruise in Chinese waters on 29 March 1935. The six submarines concluded the cruise with their return to Sasebo on 4 April 1935. On 1 October 1935, I-2 again was decommissioned and placed in reserve to undergo reconstruction, and on 15 November 1935 her division was reassigned to the Yokosuka Defense Squadron in the Yokosuka Naval District,

While I-2 was out of commission, her American-made K-tube sonar was replaced by a sonar system manufactured in Japan and her conning tower was streamlined. Submarine Division 7 returned to duty with Submarine Squadron 1 in the 1st Fleet on 20 January 1936, and after her reconstruction was complete, I-2 was recommissioned on 1 December 1936 and rejoined the division. On 27 March 1937, I-2 departed Sasebo in company with I-1, I-3, I-4, I-5, and I-6 for training in the vicinity of Qingdao, China. The six submarines concluded the training cruise with their arrival at Ariake Bay on 6 April 1937.

=== Second Sino-Japanese War ===
On 7 July 1937 the first day of the Marco Polo Bridge Incident took place, beginning the Second Sino-Japanese War. On 28 July 1937, I-2′s division, Submarine Division 7, was assigned to Submarine Squadron 1 in the 1st Fleet, and in September 1937 Submarine Squadron 1 was reassigned to the 3rd Fleet which in turn was subordinated to the China Area Fleet for service in Chinese waters. The squadron, consisting of I-2, her division mate I-1, and the submarines I-3, I-4, I-5, and I-6, deployed to a base at Hong Kong with the submarine tenders Chōgei and Taigei in September 1937. From Hong Kong, the submarines began operations in support of a Japanese blockade of China and patrols of China's central and southern coast. From 20 or 21 (sources disagree) to 23 August 1937, all six submarines of Submarine Squadron 1 operated in the East China Sea as distant cover for an operation in which the battleships Nagato, Mutsu, Haruna, and Kirishima and the light cruiser Isuzu ferried troops from Tadotsu, Japan, to Shanghai, China.

Submarine Squadron 1 was based at Hong Kong until the autumn of 1938. In an effort to reduce international tensions over the conflict in China, Japan withdrew its submarines from Chinese waters in December 1938.

=== 1938–1941 ===
Submarine Division 7 was reassigned to the Submarine School at Kure, Japan, on 15 December 1938, and was reduced to the Third Reserve in the Yokosuka Naval District on 15 November 1939. While in reserve, I-2 on 20 November 1939 began a refit, during which impulse tanks were installed on her Type 15 torpedo tubes, her collapsible radio masts were removed, and a long-range very-low-frequency receiver. Meanwhile, Submarine Division 7 returned to active service when it was assigned to Submarine Squadron 2 in the 6th Fleet, a component of the Combined Fleet, on 15 November 1940. After completion of her refit, I-2 was recommissioned on 31 July 1941 and rejoined her division.

On 10 November 1941, the commander of the 6th Fleet, Vice Admiral Mitsumi Shimizu, gathered the commanding officers of the fleet's submarines together for a meeting aboard his flagship, the light cruiser Katori, anchored in Saeki Bay, and his chief of staff briefed them on the upcoming attack on Pearl Harbor, which would bring Japan and the United States into World War II. As the Imperial Japanese Navy began to deploy for the upcoming conflict in the Pacific, I-2 got underway from Yokosuka at 12:00 on 16 November 1941, bound for the Hawaiian Islands. By 1 December 1941, she was within 300 nautical miles (560 km; 350 mi) of Oahu.

=== World War II ===
==== First war patrol ====
On 7 December 1941, I-2 arrived in her patrol area in the Kauai Channel between Oahu and Kauai with orders to attack any ships which sortied from Pearl Harbor during or after the attack, which occurred that morning. On 27 December 1941, she received an order from the commander of Submarine Squadron 2 aboard the submarine I-7 to bombard the harbor at Kahului, Maui, on 30 December. I-2 arrived off Kahului during daylight hours on 30 December 1941 and conducted a periscope reconnaissance of the harbor, noting a small merchant ship moored at the pier. After dark, she surfaced and fired ten 140-millimeter (5.5 in) high-explosive rounds from her deck guns at the ship, but most fell short and some went wide in the direction of Puʻunene.

On 9 January 1942, I-2 was ordered to divert from her patrol and search for the United States Navy aircraft carrier USS Lexington (CV-2), which the submarine I-18 had sighted. but she did not find Lexington. She arrived at Kwajalein in company with I-1 and I-3 on 22 January 1942. The three submarines departed Kwajalein on 24 January 1942 bound for Yokosuka, which I-2 reached on 1 February 1942.

==== Second war patrol ====
While I-2 was at Yokosuka, Submarine Squadron 2 — consisting of I-1, I-2, I-3, I-4, I-6, and I-7 — was assigned to the Dutch East Indies Invasion Force. Accordingly, I-2 departed Yokosuka on 12 February 1942 bound for Palau, where she arrived on 16 February 1942 and refueled from the oiler Fujisan Maru, then got back underway on 17 February in company with I-3 bound for the Netherlands East Indies. The two submarines arrived at Staring Bay on the Southeast Peninsula of Celebes just southeast of Kendari on 22 February 1942, then put back to sea that same afternoon, heading for the Indian Ocean off the southwest coast of Australia, beginning I-2′s second war patrol.

On 1 March 1942, I-2 was in the Indian Ocean south of Bali when she attacked two unidentified Allied steamships at 20:03 Greenwich Mean Time, claiming one of them sunk. One source identifies the sunken ship as the Dutch 1,172-gross register ton merchant ship Parigi, sunk west of Freemantle, Australia. At 00:58 on 2 March 1942, she unsuccessfully attacked another Allied steamer, probably the Dutch merchant ship Generaal Verspijck.

On 11 March 1942, I-2 sighted the British 4,360-gross register ton armed cargo ship Chilka — which was nearing the end of a voyage from Calcutta, India, to Padang, Sumatra — in the Indian Ocean off western Sumatra 60 nautical miles (110 km; 69 mi) south of Padang at 00°23′S 095°41′E. I-2 surfaced on Chilka′s port quarter and opened fire with both of her 140-millimeter (5.5 in) deck guns. Chilka fired back with her only gun, but over the next 25 minutes suffered 14 hits, which killed three officers, three lascars, and a gunner. After I-2 knocked out Chilka′s gun, Chilka stopped her engines and surrendered. I-2 ceased fire and allowed Chilka′s survivors to abandon ship. Chilka sank at 00°30′S 095°50′E. I-2 concluded her patrol with her arrival at Penang in Japanese-occupied British Malaya on 14 March 1942.

==== Indian Ocean raid ====
Orders arrived from the headquarters of the Combined Fleet for all the submarines of Submarine Squadron 2 except for I-1 to conduct reconnaissance operations along the coast of Ceylon and western coast of India in preparation for Operation C, the upcoming Indian Ocean raid by the aircraft carriers of the Combined Fleet's Mobile Force. Accordingly, I-2 departed Penang at 12:00 on 22 March 1942 to reconnoiter Trincomalee on the coast of Ceylon. She arrived off Ceylon on 31 March 1942 and reached a point 10 nautical miles (19 km; 12 mi) off Trincomalee Bay at 08:00 local time on 2 April 1942, but was unable to get any closer to the coast because of heavy patrolling by Allied patrol boats, sighting no enemy vessels except for the patrol boats. She transmitted her first weather report off Trincomalee on 3 April 1942. At 06:31 on 4 April 1942 she reported her activities since her arrival on station at 31 March 1942, noting that she had sighted no enemy aircraft since her arrival. The following day, carrier aircraft of the Mobile Force struck Colombo, Ceylon.

On 7 April 1942 I-2 reported sinking an unidentified merchant ship at 00°48′N 082°18′E, and she transmitted another weather report on 9 April 1942. Later that day, Japanese carrier aircraft struck Trincomalee. Reassigned to the Advanced Force, I-2 departed her patrol area on 10 April 1942 and proceeded to Singapore, which she reached on 15 April 1942.

==== April–May 1942 ====
I-2 got underway from Singapore on 21 April 1942 bound for Japan, where she arrived at Yokosuka on 1 May 1942 to undergo a refit. During the refit, shipyard workers replaced her 7.7-millimeter machine gun on her bridge with a 13.2-millimeter Type 3 machine gun, replaced her German-made Zeiss 3-metre (10 ft) rangefinder with a Japanese-made Type 97 rangefinder, removed some of the armor protecting her torpedo storage compartment, and installed an automatic trim system aboard her.

==== Third war patrol ====
The Aleutian Islands campaign began on 3–4 June 1942 with a Japanese air raid on Dutch Harbor, Alaska, followed quickly by the unopposed Japanese occupation in the Aleutian Islands of Attu on 5 June and Kiska on 7 June 1942. On 11 June 1942, I-2 set out for Aleutian waters in company with I-1, I-3, I-6, and I-7 to begin her third war patrol. On 20 June 1942, I-1, I-2, and I-3 joined the "K" patrol line in the North Pacific Ocean between 48°N 178°W and 50°N 178°W. Refueling from the oiler Teiyō Maru on 24 June 1942, she remained on the patrol line until 3 July 1942. On 17 July 1942, she attacked an unidentified Soviet merchant ship with gunfire 100 nautical miles (190 km; 120 mi) south of Dutch Harbor, but a U.S. Navy PBY Catalina flying boat drove her off. On 20 July 1942, she was reassigned to the Advance Force and ordered to return to Japan. She arrived at Yokosuka on 1 August 1942 and underwent repairs there.

==== Guadalcanal campaign ====
While I-2 was at Yokosuka, the Guadalcanal campaign began on 7 August 1942 with U.S. amphibious landings on Guadalcanal, Tulagi, Florida Island, Gavutu, and Tanambogo in the southeastern Solomon Islands. Assigned to operations around Guadalcanal, I-2 left Yokosuka on 8 September 1942 in company with I-1, I-3, I-4, and I-5, stopped at Truk from 15 to 17 September 1942, and proceeded to Shortland Island in the Shortland Islands. While she was at sea, she was reassigned along with I-1 and I-3 to the Outer South Seas Force in the 8th Fleet. On 26 September, I-2 reached Shortland Island, where the destroyers Amagiri and Ayanami had delivered four Daihatsu-class landing craft, each loaded with a Type 88 75-millimeter antiaircraft gun, an artillery tractor, and several Type 96 150-millimeter infantry mortars. The commanding officers of I-2 and I-3 took part in a staff conference to decide on a way of delivering the equipment to the Imperial Japanese Army forces on Guadalcanal, and, after they made their plans, I-2 departed on a supply run to Guadalcanal with I-3 at 03:30 on 27 September 1942, with both submarines towing a Daihatsu. On 5 October 1942 she departed Shortland Island towing another Daihatsu to Guadalcanal, but was diverted en route to Bryce Island, where she arrived on 6 October at 05:00, unloaded the Daihatsu, and departed. She took part in a third supply run to Guadalcanal on 7 October 1942, and made a fourth run, towing a Daihatsu, on 9 October 1942.

On 10 October 1942, I-2 was reassigned to the Advance Unit. After sunset on 11 October 1942, she arrived off Kamimbo Bay on the northwest coast of Guadalcanal and unloaded cargo, then proceeded to a patrol area west of Guadalcanal. She developed clutch problems, and her air conditioning system broke down, but she remained on patrol. Operating in Savo Strait on 12 October 1942 in the immediate aftermath of the Battle of Cape Esperance, she sighted what she identified as an enemy cruiser — possibly the destroyer USS McCalla (DD-488) rescuing survivors after the battle — at 21:00 and attempted an attack, but could not get into a firing position. About 15 nautical miles (28 km; 17 mi) west of Savo Island, she sighted an empty lifeboat and a drifting seaplane float. She returned to Truk on 3 November 1942, and her crew began makeshift repairs there assisted by crewmen from Urakami Maru and Hie Maru.

I-2 was assigned to the "B" Patrol Unit on 15 November 1942. On 16 November, the commander of the 6th Fleet, Vice Admiral Teruhisa Komatsu, addressed a meeting of the commanding officers of his fleet's submarines to inform them that the commander-in-chief of the Combined Fleet, Admiral Isoroku Yamamoto, had ordered the 6th Fleet to organize a system of supply runs to the 17th Army forces fighting on Guadalcanal. Assigned to supply missions, I-2 departed Truk on 19 November 1942 bound for Rabaul, where she stopped from 22 to 24 November to pick up a Daihatsu, then proceeded to Shortland Island, which she reached on 25 November 1942. She departed on 27 November, towing the Daihatsu, and reached Kamimbo Bay on the coast of Guadalcanal on 29 November 1942. She unloaded the Daihatsu, then scuttled it because it had developed engine problems during the voyage. She then got underway for Shortland Island, which she reached on 2 December 1942. She embarked 17 passengers (a combination of antiaircraft gunners and midget submarine maintenance personnel from the seaplane tender Chiyoda) and loaded 20 tons of food and ammunition and departed at 16:30 on 3 December 1942. She arrived at Kamimbo Bay after sunset on 5 December 1942, discharged her passengers and cargo, took aboard sick and wounded personnel from naval units on Guadalcanal, and got underway at 23:00, returning to Shortland Island on 7 December 1942. On 9 December 1942, she set out on her seventh supply run to Guadalcanal, but received orders on 11 December to halt her supply operations because of the loss of I-3 off Kamimbo Bay on 9 December 1942 while on a supply mission. She aborted her voyage and returned to Shortland Island, arriving there on 13 December 1942. After arriving, she became the temporary flagship of her division.

After embarking the commander of Submarine Division 7, I-2 left Shortland Island on 14 December 1942 bound for Truk. At 13:21 that day, the submarine USS Wahoo (SS-238) sighted I-2 on the surface off Shortland at 06°30′S 156°09′E in poor visibility amid numerous rain squalls, identifying her at a range of 3,000 yards (2,740 m) by a large Imperial Japanese Navy flag she was flying and by "I 2" painted on her conning tower. At 13:28, Wahoo fired three torpedoes at an estimated range of 800 yards (730 m). Wahoo observed a hit 20 feet (6 m) forward of I-2′s conning tower, and two-and-a-half minutes later Wahoo′s sound operator reported hearing I-2 breaking up as she sank. However, I-2 was unscathed; she heard two large explosions — apparently two of Wahoo′s torpedoes detonating prematurely — and crash-dived, believing herself under attack by an aircraft. After submerging, I-2 heard a third explosion. I-2 continued her voyage to Truk, which she reached on 17 December 1942, but Wahoo received credit for sinking her until an Allied examination of Japanese records after World War II confirmed that I-2 had survived Wahoo′s attack.

After almost a month's stay at Truk, I-2 got back underway on 16 January 1943, stopped at Rabaul — where she took aboard a Daihatsu — from 16 to 20 January 1943, and then headed for Guadalcanal on her eighth supply run. She arrived off Kamimbo Bay on 26 January but, finding the area heavily patrolled by Allied aircraft and motor torpedo boats, did not attempt to deliver her cargo until the following day. She surfaced after sunset on 27 January 1943 and unloaded 15 tons of cargo before two motor torpedo boats sighted her and forced her to submerge. She headed back for Rabaul and was reassigned to the "A" Patrol Unit on 29 January while at sea.

I-2 arrived at Rabaul on 31 January 1943. That day, the Japanese evacuation of Guadalcanal, Operation Ke, began. By the time it concluded on 9 February, 11,700 Japanese troops had been evacuated and the six-month Guadalcanal campaign finally came to an end. However, I-2 had one more mission to perform at Guadalcanal. Reassigned to "A" Patrol Unit on 7 February 1943, she departed Rabaul on 9 February, stopped briefly at Shortland Island on 11 February and departed the same day with I-1′s torpedo officer aboard and tasked to find and destroy the wreck of I-1, which had run aground and sunk at Kamimbo Bay on 29 January 1943 while in combat with two Royal New Zealand Navy minesweeper corvettes. After sunset on 13 February 1943, she penetrated Kamimbo Bay to a distance of only 1,100 yards (1,010 m) from shore but failed to find I-1′s wreck. On 15 February 1943 she tried again, reaching a point 1.4 nautical miles (2.6 km; 1.6 mi) from the coast before motor torpedo boats attacked her with depth charges. After an aircraft also attacked her at 11:20, she gave up and proceeded to Shortland Island, which she reached on 18 February 1943. She got back underway the same day, called at Truk from 23 to 26 February 1943, and then continued on to Japan, where she arrived at Yokosuka on 5 March 1943 for repairs.

==== Return to the Aleutians ====
On 1 April 1943, Submarine Division 7 was reassigned to the 5th Fleet for service in the Aleutian Islands. The Japanese position in the Aleutians declined rapidly after the Battle of Attu began on 11 May 1943 with U.S. landings on Attu Island. On 21 May 1943, with the situation on Attu deteriorating — ultimately the battle there ended on 30 May 1943 with the annihilation of the Japanese garrison — the Japanese Imperial General Headquarters decided to evacuate the isolated garrison on Kiska. The evacuation began via submarine on 26 May 1943, with the submarines carrying evacuated personnel to Paramushiro in the Kuril Islands.

With her repairs complete, I-2 departed Yokosuka at 14:30 on 22 May 1943 bound for Paramushiro, which she reached at 04:07 on 27 May 1943. She departed Paramushiro at 0800 on 30 May 1943 with a cargo of 250 cases of ammunition. Arriving at Kiska at 22:20 on 3 June 1943, she unloaded her cargo, embarked 18 sailors and 24 other personnel, and got back underway at 00:55 on 4 June 1943 bound for Paramushiro. She reached Kataoka Bay at Paramushiro at 19:55 on 8 June 1943. She put back to sea at 14:00 on 11 June with a cargo of antiaircraft ammunition, mail, and six tons of food, beginning a far more eventful voyage to Kiska. On 16 June 1943, while proceeding north on the surface at 12 knots (22 km/h; 14 mph) in dense fog after losing her bearings, she nearly ran aground on Buldir Reef, and on 17 June, while she again was on the surface, a radar-equipped Allied surface warship surprised her and opened gunfire on her, scoring a hit in her port boat storage space which, fortunately for I-2, was a dud. I-2 crash-dived and finally escaped after being pursued for seven hours, also quickly controlling a leak that began in her engine room. She arrived at Kiska at 20:05 on 17 June, discharged her cargo, embarked 31 sailors and nine other passengers, and got back underway at 20:45. She made Kataoka Bay at Paramushiro on 22 June 1943.

I-2 departed Paramushiro again at 16:00 on 29 June 1943 in company with the submarines Ro-104 and Ro-105, tasked this time with supporting the Kiska evacuation by providing weather reports from an area 5 to 10 nautical miles (9.3 to 18.5 km; 5.8 to 11.5 mi) north of Adak Island. While she was entering Amchitka Pass on 5 July 1943, an Allied surface ship detected her at 03:45 and pursued her for 18 hours, depth-charging her twice. She finally arrived in her patrol area on 10 July 1943 and transmitted her first weather report that day. On 13 July 1943, while she was on the surface recharging her batteries after sunset, an aircraft attacked her, but she submerged and suffered no damage. On 15 July 1943, with her weather-reporting duties completed, she departed the Adak area to commence her fourth war patrol. Notified on 22 July 1943 that U.S. Navy Task Group 16.21 had bombarded Kiska, I-2 attempted to intercept the task group; she sighted two green flares and her sound operator heard the screw noises of multiple ships, but dense fog prevented her from making visual contact with the task group's ships, preventing her from attempting an attack. She arrived in the waters northeast of Amchitka on 24 July 1943, and on 25 July joined the submarine I-23 on the "D" patrol line. The Japanese completed the evacuation of Kiska on 28 July 1943, and at 20:25 that day I-2 received orders to bombard Amchitka Army Airfield near Constantine Harbor on Amchitka, but she failed to find the airfield because of heavy fog. Ordered at 2400 on 29 July 1943 to return to Paramushiro, she reached Kataoka Bay at Paramushiro on 4 August 1943. She departed on 6 August for Yokosuka, which she reached on 11 August 1943.

While undergoing repairs at Yokosuka, I-2 suffered a mishap on 10 September 1943 when she collided with a breakwater in Yokosuka Bay at Yoshikura during a transfer, but she suffered only minor damage. After her repairs were complete, she got underway from Yokosuka on 9 October 1943, stopped at Paramushiro from 14 to 15 October 1943, and then set out on an anti-shipping patrol west of the Aleutian Islands. On 14 November 1943, she became the first Japanese submarine to use the Type 92 electric torpedo with magnetic exploder in combat, claiming an unidentified Allied transport torpedoed and sunk off Amchitka Pass. On 1 December 1943, she returned to Yokosuka for repairs, and probably for the installation of a radar detector as well.

==== New Guinea campaign ====
On 1 February 1944, I-2′s division, Submarine Division 7, was resubordinated directly to 6th Fleet headquarters. Assigned to support the supply of Japanese forces fighting on New Guinea and nearby islands in the New Guinea campaign, she departed Yokosuka on 10 March 1944 and arrived on 19 March 1944 at Truk, where Fuyo Maru and the submarine chaser CH-20 escorted I-2 and the submarine I-38 into the lagoon. On 26 March 1944, I-2 departed for New Britain, where she arrived at Kimbe Bay on 2 April 1944, unloaded her cargo, and got back underway the same day. She arrived at Rabaul on 4 April 1944, then departed later that day bound for Truk, where she was scheduled to arrive by 11 April 1944.

==== Loss ====
I-2 was submerged in the Bismarck Sea 50 nautical miles (93 km; 58 mi) west-northwest of New Hanover Island en route Truk when the destroyer USS Saufley (DD-465) detected her on sonar at 06:30 on 7 April 1944. At 06:45 Saufley dropped a pattern of nine depth charges, followed by another pattern of nine at 07:15. Saufley′s sound operator heard two underwater explosions after the second depth charge attack, and Saufley′s crew observed an oil slick on the surface at 07:23. It marked the end of I-2, which sank at 02°17′S 149°14′E with the loss of her entire crew of 111 men.

On 4 May 1944, the Imperial Japanese Navy officially declared I-2 to be presumed lost off New Ireland. She was stricken from the Navy list on 10 June 1944.
