= Japanese submarine I-4 =

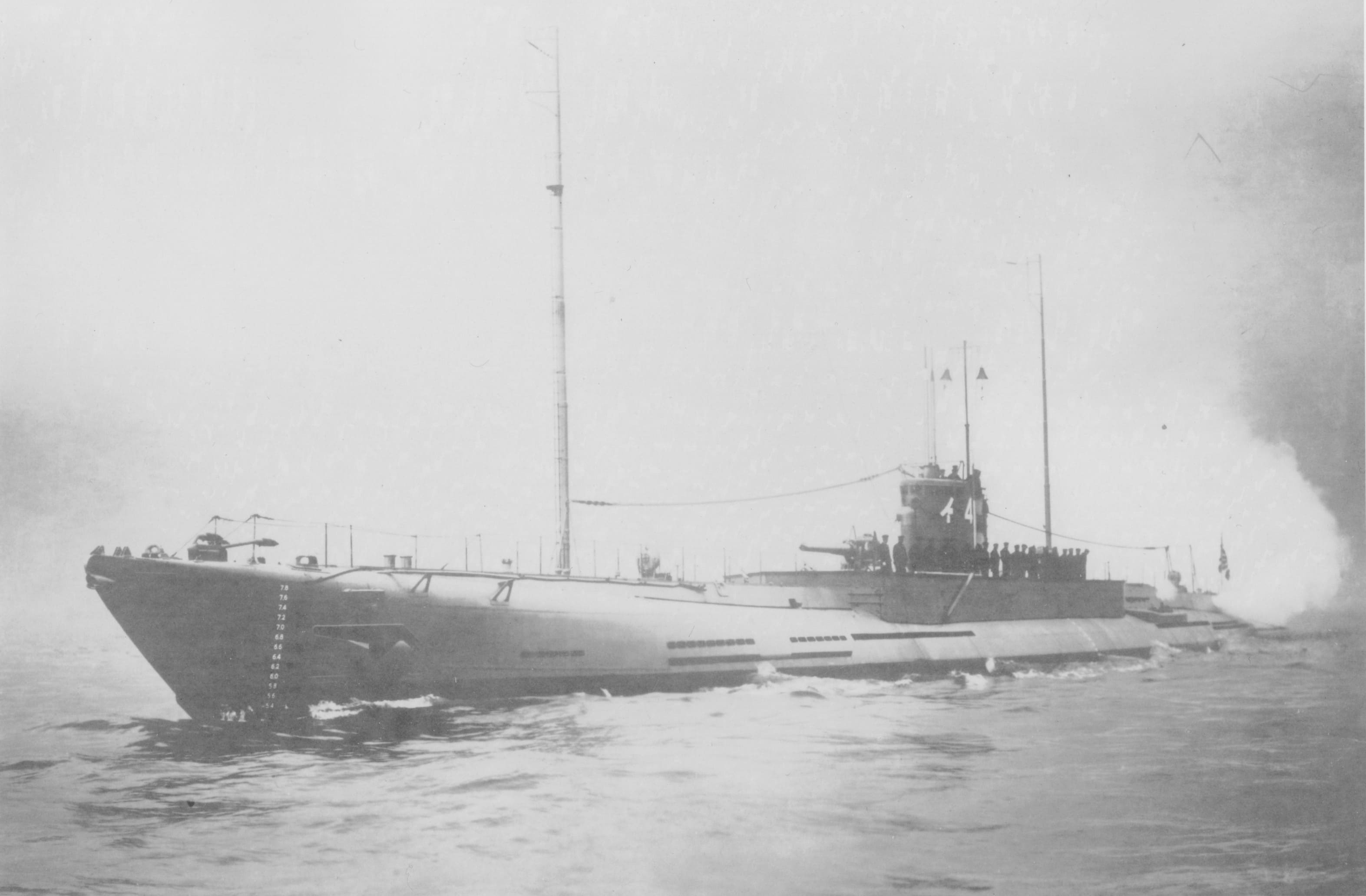
- I-4 upon commissioning on 24 December 1929

History

Japan
- Name: I-4
- Builder: Kawasaki Shipbuilding Corporation, Kobe, Japan
- Laid down: 17 April 1926
- Launched: 22 May 1928
- Completed: 24 December 1929
- Commissioned: 24 December 1929
- Decommissioned: 15 November 1935
- Recommissioned: by 27 March 1937
- Decommissioned: 15 November 1939
- Recommissioned: by 15 November 1940
- Decommissioned: 19 October 1941
- Recommissioned: 31 October 1941
- Fate: Sunk 21 December 1942
- Stricken: 1 March 1943

General characteristics
- Class & type: J1 type submarine
- Displacement: 2,135 tons (surfaced); 2,791 tons (submerged)
- Length: 320 ft (98 m)
- Beam: 30 ft (9.1 m)
- Draught: 16.5 ft (5 m)
- Propulsion: Twin-shaft MAN 10-cylinder 4-stroke diesel engines; 6,000 bhp (4,474 kW); Two electric motors; 2,600 hp (1,939 kW)
- Speed: 18 kn (33 km/h; 21 mph) (surfaced) 8 kn (15 km/h; 9.2 mph) (submerged)
- Range: 24,400 nmi (45,200 km; 28,100 mi) at 10 kn (19 km/h; 12 mph)
- Test depth: 80 m (262 ft)
- Boats & landing craft carried: 1 x 46 ft (14 m) Daihatsu (added November 1942)
- Complement: 68 officers and men
- Armament: two 140mm/40 caliber (5.5-in) deck guns (one each fore and aft); after gun removed November 1942; 6 × 533 mm (21 in) torpedo tubes; 20 × Type 95 oxygen-driven torpedoes

I-4 was an Imperial Japanese Navy J1 type submarine commissioned in 1929. She was a large cruiser submarine that served in the Second Sino-Japanese War and World War II. During the latter conflict she operated in support of the attack on Pearl Harbor, conducted anti-shipping patrols in the Indian Ocean, supported the Indian Ocean raid, and took part in the Aleutian Islands campaign, Guadalcanal campaign, and New Guinea campaign before she was sunk in December 1942.

== Construction and commissioning ==
Built by Kawasaki at Kobe, Japan, I-4 was laid down on 17 April 1926. She was launched on 22 May 1928 and was completed and commissioned on 24 December 1929.

== Service history ==
=== 1929–1937 ===
Upon commissioning, I-4 was attached to the Yokosuka Naval District and assigned to Submarine Division 7. Sources differ on whether Submarine Division 7 was assigned at the time to the Yokosuka Defense Division in the Yokosuka Naval District or to Submarine Squadron 2 in the 2nd Fleet, a component of the Combined Fleet. On 1 August 1930, when Submarine Division 8 was created, I-4 and her sister ship I-3 were placed in the new division. On 1 December 1930, Submarine Division 8 began duty with Submarine Squadron 1 in the 1st Fleet, a component of the Combined Fleet. The division was reassigned to the Yokosuka Defense Division in the Yokosuka Naval District on 1 October 1931, but it began another tour of duty in Submarine Squadron 1 in the 1st Fleet on 1 December 1931. I-4 was off Kyushu near the Mishima Islands taking part in an exercise in which a group of submarines practiced a mock combined attack on a line of zigzagging battleships on 14 June 1932 when she unexpectedly surfaced in front of the battleships. The battleship Hyūga, making 12 knots (22 km/h; 14 mph), took evasive action at the last minute and managed to avoid a direct collision with the stationary I-4, although Hyūga suffered minor damage to her hull plating when her bow grazed I-4's hull.

Submarine Division 8 completed its assignment to Submarine Squadron 1 on 1 October 1932 and again was assigned to the Yokosuka Defense Division in the Yokosuka Naval District, but it returned to duty in Submarine Squadron 1 in the 1st Fleet on 15 November 1933. I-4 got underway from Sasebo, Japan, in company with the other vessels of Submarine Squadron 1 — I-1, I-2, and I-3 of Submarine Division 7 and I-5 and I-6 of Submarine Division 8 — for a training cruise in Chinese waters on 29 March 1935. The six submarines concluded the cruise with their return to Sasebo on 4 April 1935. On 15 November 1935, Submarine Division 8 again returned to the Yokosuka Defense Division in the Yokosuka Naval District, and that day I-4 was placed in reserve.

Submarine Division 8 returned to service in Submarine Squadron 1 in the 1st Fleet on 1 December 1936. On 27 March 1937, I-4 departed Sasebo in company with I-1, I-2, I-3, I-5, and I-6 for training in the vicinity of Qingdao, China. The six submarines concluded the training cruise with their arrival at Ariake Bay on 6 April 1937.

=== Second Sino-Japanese War ===
On 7 July 1937 the first day of the Marco Polo Bridge Incident took place, beginning the Second Sino-Japanese War. In September 1937 Submarine Squadron 1 was reassigned to the 3rd Fleet, which in turn was subordinated to the China Area Fleet for service in Chinese waters. The squadron, consisting of I-1, I-2, I-3, I-4, I-5, and I-6, deployed to a base at Hong Kong with the submarine tenders Chōgei and Taigei in September 1937. From Hong Kong, the submarines began operations in support of a Japanese blockade of China and patrols of China′s central and southern coast. From 20 or 21 (sources disagree) to 23 August 1937, all six submarines of Submarine Squadron 1 operated in the East China Sea as distant cover for an operation in which the battleships Nagato, Mutsu, Haruna, and Kirishima and the light cruiser Isuzu ferried troops from Tadotsu, Japan, to Shanghai, China.

Submarine Squadron 1 was based at Hong Kong until the autumn of 1938. In an effort to reduce international tensions over the conflict in China, Japan withdrew its submarines from Chinese waters in December 1938.

=== 1939–1941 ===
Submarine Division 8 was placed in Third Reserve in the Yokosuka Naval District on 15 November 1939. The division was resubordinated on 15 November 1940 to Submarine Squadron 2 in the 6th Fleet, a component of the Combined Fleet. On 7 January 1941, I-4 became flagship of Submarine Division 8. She briefly was in reserve from 19 to 31 October 1941.

On 10 November 1941 — by which time I-4, I-5, I-6, and the submarine I-7 made up Submarine Division 8, with I-7 serving as squadron flagship — the commander-in-chief of the 6th Fleet, Vice Admiral Mitsumi Shimizu, gathered the commanding officers of the fleet′s submarines together for a meeting aboard his flagship, the light cruiser Katori, which was anchored in Saeki Bay. His chief of staff briefed them on the upcoming attack on Pearl Harbor, which would bring Japan and the United States into World War II. As the Imperial Japanese Navy began to deploy for the upcoming conflict in the Pacific, I-4, I-5, I-6, and I-7 got underway from Yokosuka on 16 November 1941, bound for the Hawaiian Islands. The submarines received the message "Climb Mount Niitaka 1208" (Japanese: Niitakayama nobore 1208) from the Combined Fleet on 2 December 1941, indicating that war with the Allies would commence on 8 December 1941 Japan time, which was on 7 December 1941 on the other side of the International Date Line in Hawaii.

=== World War II ===
==== First war patrol ====
On 7 December 1941, the submarines of Submarine Squadron 2 took up patrol stations across a stretch of the Pacific Ocean from northeast to northwest of Oahu, with I-4′s patrol area adjacent to that of I-6. The submarines had orders to conduct reconnaissance in the area and attack any ships which sortied from Pearl Harbor during or after the attack, which occurred that morning. At around 03:55 on 14 December 1941, I-4 hit the starboard side of the 4,858-gross register ton Norwegian merchant ship Hųegh Merchant with a torpedo 29 nautical miles (54 km; 33 mi) east-northeast of Makapuʻu Point, Oahu. Hųegh Merchant — which had been on a voyage from San Francisco, California, to Manila in the Philippines with 7,500 tons of general cargo including 100 tons of explosives and when the war broke out and had been diverted to Honolulu, Hawaii — caught fire, and at around 04:05 I-4 fired another torpedo which hit her near the same place as the first. Hųegh Merchant sank at 05:33, and the United States Navy destroyer minesweeper Trever rescued her passengers and crew. Oil barrels from Hųegh Merchant's cargo drifted ashore on Kauai a number of days later.

On 9 January 1942, I-4 was ordered to divert from her patrol and search for the American aircraft carrier Lexington, which the submarine I-18 had sighted, but she did not find Lexington. She arrived at Kwajalein on 22 January 1942, then got back underway on 24 January 1942 bound for Yokosuka, which she reached on 2 February 1942.

==== Second war patrol ====
While I-4 was at Yokosuka, Submarine Squadron 2 — consisting of I-1, I-2, I-3, I-4, I-6, and the squadron flagship, I-7 — was assigned to the Dutch East Indies Invasion Force on 8 February 1942. Accordingly, I-4 departed Yokosuka on 12 February 1942 bound for Palau, where she arrived on 16 February 1942, then got back underway on 17 February bound for the Netherlands East Indies. She arrived at Staring Bay on the Southeast Peninsula of Celebes just southeast of Kendari on 22 February 1942, then put back to sea on 23 February, heading for the Indian Ocean south of Java, where she was to conduct her second war patrol.

At about 16:15 on 28 February 1942, I-4 sank an unidentified Allied steamship — sometimes identified as the Singapore-based Dutch 1,693-gross register ton merchant steamer Ban Ho Guan, although Ban Ho Guan may have not been in the area at the time — in the Indian Ocean southwest of Bali. She bombarded the Cocos Islands on 3 March, and concluded her patrol with her arrival at Penang in Japanese-occupied British Malaya at 12:50 Japan Standard Time on 8 March 1942.

==== Third war patrol ====
Orders arrived from the headquarters of the Combined Fleet for all the submarines of Submarine Squadron 2 except for I-1 to conduct reconnaissance operations along the coast of Ceylon and western coast of India in preparation for Operation C, the upcoming Indian Ocean raid by the aircraft carriers of the Combined Fleet′s Mobile Force. Accordingly, I-4 departed Penang on 28 March 1942 with the commander of Submarine Division 8 embarked and with orders to conduct a reconnaissance in the Indian Ocean of Eight Degree Channel and the waters off Colombo, Ceylon.

At the western entrance of Eight Degree Channel at about 15:55 on 6 April 1942 — the day after Japanese carrier planes raided Colombo — I-4 fired two Type 96 torpedoes at the American 6,617-ton steamer Washingtonian, which was on a voyage from Suez, Egypt, to Colombo. Washingtonian sighted one of the torpedoes approaching on her port side at a distance of 500 yards (460 m) and began a slow turn in an attempt to avoid it, but both torpedoes hit, setting Washingtonian's fuel tanks on fire. Fire soon engulfed the ship, and she had taken on a 25-degree list to port when her crew of 29 and two passengers abandoned ship at 16:05. Washingtonian eventually sank. On 10 April 1942 after 01:00, I-4 surfaced off Colombo in the vicinity of 07°N 79°E and opened fire with both of her deck guns on a 200-ton Maldivian buggalow, firing fourteen 140-millimeter (5.5 in) rounds and heavily damaging the vessel.

I-4's patrol ended with her arrival at Singapore on 16 April 1942. She departed Singapore on 21 April 1942 to head for Yokosuka, which she reached on 1 May 1942.

==== Fourth war patrol ====
While I-4 was at Yokosuka, the Aleutian Islands campaign began on 3–4 June 1942 with a Japanese air raid on Dutch Harbor, Alaska, followed quickly by the unopposed Japanese occupation in the Aleutian Islands of Attu on 5 June and Kiska on 7 June 1942. On 10 June 1942, I-1, I-2, I-3, I-4, I-5, I-6, and I-7 were reassigned to the Northern Force for duty in the Aleutians, and on 11 June 1942 I-4 set out for Aleutian waters in company with I-1, I-2, I-3, and I-7 to begin her fourth war patrol. On 20 June 1942, I-1, I-2, and I-4 joined the "K" patrol line in the North Pacific Ocean between 48°N 178°W and 50°N 178°W. I-4 remained on the patrol line until 3 July 1942. On 20 July 1942, she was reassigned to the Advance Force and ordered to return to Japan. She arrived at Yokosuka on 1 August 1942 and began an overhaul.

==== Guadalcanal campaign ====
During I-4's stay at Yokosuka, the Guadalcanal campaign began on 7 August 1942 with U.S. amphibious landings on Guadalcanal, Tulagi, Florida Island, Gavutu, and Tanambogo in the southeastern Solomon Islands. On 20 August 1942, Submarine Division 8 was disbanded, and I-4 was reassigned to Submarine Division 7. On 8 September 1942 she departed Yokosuka to head to the Solomons war zone and, after calling at Truk from 15 to 19 September 1942, set out for her fifth war patrol, assigned a patrol area south of San Cristobal.

On 29 September 1942, I-4 was on the surface 12 nautical miles (22 km; 14 mi) southwest of Cape Sidney on San Cristobal when at 23:00 she sighted the 7,447-gross register ton cargo ship USS Alhena on her port bow steaming east-southeast at 13 knots (24 km/h; 15 mph), escorted by the destroyer USS Monssen. I-4 submerged and began an approach at 5 knots (9.3 km/h; 5.8 mph). At 23:44, she fired two Type 96 torpedoes at Alhena and at 23:51 observed the first torpedo hit Alhena's stern near No. 5 hold, blowing a 45-foot (13.7 m) hole open on either side of her stern and igniting several fires. The second torpedo also hit, but did not explode. Alhena went dead in the water at 10°47′S 161°16′E and took on a 10-degree stern list. Assuming Alhena would sink, I-4 descended to 165 feet (50 m) and began to exit the area at 3 knots (5.6 km/h; 3.5 mph). She broke contact with Monssen at 00:25 on 30 September 1942. At 00:47 her sound operator reported contact with another destroyer, but I-4 soon lost this contact as well. She surfaced at 01:45 and at 04:32 reported that she had sunk a 7,000-ton cargo ship. However, although Alhena suffered six U.S. Navy and 24 United States Marine Corps personnel killed or missing she remained afloat, and in mid-1943 returned to combat reconfigured as an attack cargo ship, redesignated AKA-9.

On 5 October 1942, I-4 was reassigned to the "A" patrol group. On 10 October 1942, she and I-7 were resubordinated directly to the Advance Force and she received orders to divert from her patrol and proceed to the Espiritu Santo area, where a submarine-launched raid was scheduled to take place. The raid was cancelled, and I-4 was again assigned to the "A" patrol group on 13 October 1942. On 14 October 1942, she received orders to bombard the airfield on Espiritu Santo, but encountered limited visibility as she approached the island from the east and could not find the airfield. On 16 October 1942, she was ordered to patrol in the waters between the Solomon Islands and the New Hebrides. She was 100 nautical miles (190 km; 120 mi) west of Espiritu Santo on 25 October 1942 when she sighted a westbound battleship — probably USS Washington — and two destroyers, but she lost them in a rain squall and did not attempt an attack. She returned to Truk on 3 November 1942.

While at Truk, I-4 underwent a conversion between 4 and 16 November 1942 in which her after 140-millimeter (5.5 in) gun was replaced with a mounting abaft her conning tower for a waterproof Daihatsu-class landing craft that would allow her to discharge cargo along coastlines in the Solomon Islands, and she was reassigned to the "B" patrol unit on 15 November 1942. As her conversion was being completed, the commander of the 6th Fleet, Vice Admiral Teruhisa Komatsu, addressed a meeting of the commanding officers of his fleet′s submarines on 16 November 1942 to inform them that the commander-in-chief of the Combined Fleet, Admiral Isoroku Yamamoto, had ordered the 6th Fleet to organize a system of supply runs to the 17th Army forces fighting on Guadalcanal via submarine.

Assigned to these supply missions, I-4 departed Truk on 20 November 1942 bound for Rabaul. She stopped at Rabaul from 23 to 25 November 1942 and embarked a waterproof Daihatsu on her new mounting, then proceeded to Shortland Island in the Shortland Islands, her commanding officer receiving a briefing on supply procedures at Guadalcanal while she was at sea off Bougainville. She reached Shortland on 26 November 1942. Carrying her Daihatsu, she departed on 28 November with a cargo of 20 tons of food and medicine and reached Kamimbo Bay on the northwest coast of Guadalcanal on 30 November 1942. She quickly unloaded the Daihatsu and got back underway for Rabaul, which she reached on 3 December 1942. On 5 December 1942 at 16:00, she began another supply run to Guadalcanal, again carrying 20 tons of food and medicine, which she unloaded quickly at Kamimbo Bay on 8 December 1942 before stopping at Shortland Island from 10 to 12 December and then moving on to Rabaul, which she reached on 14 December 1942.

==== New Guinea campaign ====
On 16 December 1942, I-4 departed Rabaul on an urgent supply run to Buna, New Guinea, to support Japanese forces fighting in the New Guinea campaign. She arrived off the mouth of the Mambare River on the coast of New Guinea at 22:15 on 18 December 1942, but while she was on the surface the U.S. Navy PT boats PT-121 and PT-122 detected her. The PT boats fired two torpedoes at her, both of which missed, but they forced her to withdraw. She returned to the area a few hours later, but was unable to contact Japanese forces on shore. Her commanding officer transmitted a message saying that he had decided to abort the supply mission and return to Rabaul.

==== Loss ====
The submarine USS Seadragon, alerted to I-4's presence by Ultra intelligence information, sighted I-4 at the southern entrance to St. George's Channel off New Ireland about 20 nautical miles (37 km; 23 mi) from Rabaul, heading north on the surface at 14 knots (26 km/h; 16 mph), at 06:21 on 21 December 1942. Misidentifying I-4 as an I-168-class submarine, Seadragon described her as painted black and with the number "4" painted on her conning tower. At 06:37, Seadragon fired three Mark 10 Mod 3 torpedoes at a range of 850 yards (780 m). I-4's lookouts apparently sighted the approaching torpedoes because I-4 turned in an apparent attempt to comb their wakes. Seadragon's first torpedo suffered a gyroscope failure and missed ahead and her second torpedo detonated prematurely after running for only 18 seconds. Her third torpedo struck I-4′s stern, resulting in a ball of flames and much smoke. Seadragon saw I-4's bow rise vertically as she sank by the stern at 05°02′S 152°33′E with the loss of all 90 men on board.

On 5 January 1943, the Imperial Japanese Navy officially declared I-4 to be presumed lost with all hands off Rabaul. She was stricken from the Navy list on 1 March 1943.
