= Japanese submarine I-3 =

1925 Type J1 submarine

History

Imperial Japanese Navy
- Name: SS-76
- Builder: Kawasaki Shipbuilding Corporation, Kobe, Japan
- Laid down: 1 November 1923
- Renamed: I-3 1 November 1924
- Launched: 8 June 1925
- Completed: 30 November 1926
- Commissioned: 30 November 1926
- Decommissioned: 15 November 1935
- Recommissioned: 1 December 1936
- Decommissioned: 15 or 20 November 1939 (see text)
- Recommissioned: 27 July or 15 November 1940 (see text)
- Fate: Torpedoed and sunk, 9 December 1942
- Stricken: 20 January 1943

General characteristics
- Class & type: J1 type submarine
- Displacement: 2,135 tons (surfaced); 2,791 tons (submerged)
- Length: 320 ft (98 m)
- Beam: 30 ft (9.1 m)
- Draught: 16.5 ft (5.0 m)
- Propulsion: Twin-shaft MAN 10-cylinder 4-stroke diesels giving 6000 bhp; Two electric motors of 2600 ehp
- Speed: 18 kn (33 km/h; 21 mph) (surfaced) 8 kn (15 km/h; 9.2 mph) (submerged)
- Range: 24,400 nmi (45,200 km; 28,100 mi) at 10 kn (19 km/h; 12 mph)
- Test depth: 80 m (262 ft)
- Boats & landing craft carried: 1 x 46 ft (14 m) Daihatsu (added November 1942)
- Complement: 68 officers and men
- Armament: two 140mm/40 caliber (5.5-in) deck guns (one each fore and aft); after gun removed November 1942; 6 × 533 mm (21 in) torpedo tubes; 20 × Type 95 oxygen-driven torpedoes

I-3 was an Imperial Japanese Navy J1 type submarine commissioned in 1926. She was a large cruiser submarine. She served in the Second Sino-Japanese War and World War II. During the latter conflict she operated in support of the attack on Pearl Harbor, conducted anti-shipping patrols in the Indian Ocean, supported the Indian Ocean raid, and took part in the Aleutian Islands campaign and the Guadalcanal campaign before she was sunk in December 1942.

== Construction and commissioning ==
Built by Kawasaki at Kobe, Japan, I-3 was laid down on 1 November 1923 with the name SS-76. While she was on the building ways, she was renamed I-3 on 1 November 1924. She was launched on 8 June 1925 and was completed and commissioned on 30 November 1926.

== Service history ==
=== 1926–1937 ===
Upon commissioning, I-3 was attached to the Yokosuka Naval District. She was assigned to Submarine Division 7 in Submarine Squadron 2 in the 2nd Fleet, a component of the Combined Fleet, joining her sister ships I-1 and I-2 in that division, but sources differ on whether this assignment began on her commissioning day or on 15 January 1927. On 1 July 1927, the division was reassigned to the Yokosuka Defense Division in the Yokosuka Naval District, and on 15 September 1927 it began another assignment to Submarine Squadron 2 in the 2nd Fleet. While in the Seto Inland Sea entering Moroshima Bay on the surface at 4 knots (7.4 km/h; 4.6 mph) on 12 July 1928, I-3 suffered a rudder failure and ran aground off Ōmishima Island at 10:11, damaging her bow fuel tank. She was refloated at 16:22 and proceeded to Kure to undergo repairs at the Kure Naval Arsenal.

On 1 May 1929, I-3 was reassigned directly to the Yokosuka Naval District, and on 1 August 1930, when Submarine Division 8 was created, she and her sister ship I-4 were placed in the new division. On 1 December 1930, Submarine Division 8 began duty with Submarine Squadron 1 in the 1st Fleet, a component of the Combined Fleet. The division was reassigned to the Yokosuka Defense Division in the Yokosuka Naval District on 1 October 1931, but it began another tour of duty in Submarine Squadron 1 in the 1st Fleet on 1 December 1931. It completed this assignment on 1 October 1932 and again was assigned to the Yokosuka Defense Division in the Yokosuka Naval District. On 15 November 1933, I-3 was transferred from Submarine Division 8 back to Submarine Division7, which began service in Submarine Squadron 1 in the 1st Fleet that day.

The German naval attaché to Japan, Kapitän zur See Paul Wenneker, was scheduled to inspect I-2 and I-3 on 10 January 1935 while the two submarines were tied up at Yokosuka, Japan. Wenneker toured I-2 between 14:50 and 15:40, but his inspection of I-3 was cancelled due to bad weather. I-3 got underway from Sasebo, Japan, in company with the other vessels of Submarine Squadron 1 — I-1 and I-2 of Submarine Division 7 and I-4, I-5, and I-6 of Submarine Division 8 — for a training cruise in Chinese waters on 29 March 1935. The six submarines concluded the cruise with their return to Sasebo on 4 April 1935.

On 15 November 1935, Submarine Division 8 was reassigned to the Yokosuka Defense Squadron in the Yokosuka Naval District, and I-3 was decommissioned and placed in reserve that day to undergo reconstruction, during which her American-made K-tube sonar was replaced by a sonar system manufactured in Japan and her conning tower was streamlined. While she was out of commission, Submarine Division 7 returned to service in Submarine Squadron 1 in the 1st Fleet on 20 January 1936, and after her reconstruction was complete, I-3 was recommissioned on 1 December 1936 and returned to duty with the division.

On 27 March 1937, I-3 departed Sasebo in company with I-1, I-2, I-4, I-5, and I-6 for training in the vicinity of Qingdao, China. The six submarines concluded the training cruise with their arrival at Ariake Bay on 6 April 1937. During scheduled upkeep in Sukumo Bay on the coast of Shikoku, Japan, on 18 May 1937, I-3 suffered an explosion in a lubricating oil sump tank that killed one man and injured 17 others. She proceeded to the Kure Naval Arsenal in Kure, Japan, for repairs.

=== Second Sino-Japanese War ===
On 7 July 1937 the first day of the Marco Polo Bridge Incident took place, beginning the Second Sino-Japanese War. In September 1937 Submarine Squadron 1 was reassigned to the 3rd Fleet, which in turn was subordinated to the China Area Fleet for service in Chinese waters. The squadron, consisting of I-1, I-2, I-3, I-4, I-5, and I-6, deployed to a base at Hong Kong with the submarine tenders Chōgei and Taigei in September 1937. From Hong Kong, the submarines began operations in support of a Japanese blockade of China and patrols of China′s central and southern coast. From 21 to 23 August 1937, all six submarines of Submarine Squadron 1 operated in the East China Sea as distant cover for an operation in which the battleships Nagato, Mutsu, Haruna, and Kirishima and the light cruiser Isuzu ferried troops from Tadotsu, Japan, to Shanghai, China.

Submarine Squadron 1 was based at Hong Kong until the autumn of 1938. In an effort to reduce international tensions over the conflict in China, Japan withdrew its submarines from Chinese waters in December 1938.

==== 1938–1941 ====
Submarine Division 7 was reassigned to the Submarine School at Kure on 15 December 1938. It was reduced to the Third Reserve in the Yokosuka Naval District on 15 November 1939, although sources indicate that I-3 herself was not placed in reserve until 20 November 1939. I-3 apparently was recommissioned on 27 July 1940, although Submarine Division did not return to active service until it was assigned to Submarine Squadron 2 in the 6th Fleet, a component of the Combined Fleet, on 15 November 1940.

On 10 November 1941, the commander of the 6th Fleet, Vice Admiral Mitsumi Shimizu, gathered the commanding officers of the fleet′s submarines together for a meeting aboard his flagship, the light cruiser Katori, which was anchored in Saeki Bay. His chief of sraff briefed them on the upcoming attack on Pearl Harbor, which would bring Japan and the United States into World War II. As the Imperial Japanese Navy began to deploy for the upcoming conflict in the Pacific, I-3 got underway from Yokosuka at 12:00 on 16 November 1941, bound for the Hawaiian Islands. By 1 December 1941, she was within 300 nautical miles (560 km; 350 mi) of Oahu. She received the message "Climb Mount Niitaka 1208" (Japanese: Niitakayama nobore 1208) from the Combined Fleet on 2 December 1941, indicating that war with the Allies would commence on 8 December 1941 Japan time, which was on 7 December 1941 on the other side of the International Date Line in Hawaii.

=== World War II ===
==== First war patrol ====
On 7 December 1941, I-1, I-2, and I-3 arrived in their patrol areas in the Kauai Channel between Oahu and Kauai, with I-3 the easternmost of the three. They had orders to conduct reconnaissance in the area and attack any ships which sortied from Pearl Harbor during or after the attack, which occurred that morning. On 27 December 1941, I-3 received an order from the commander of Submarine Squadron 2 aboard the submarine I-7 to bombard the harbor at Nawiliwili, Kauai, on 30 December. She arrived off Nawiliwili during daylight hours on 30 December 1941 and conducted a periscope reconnaissance of the Wailua River estuary. After dark, she surfaced and fired twenty 140-millimetre (5.5 in) high-explosive rounds from her deck guns, targeting the harbor′s breakwater and a building she identified as a warehouse. Most of the rounds fell short, although one shell damaged a house with shrapnel and another punched a hole in a large gasoline storage tank, which did not explode. The bombardment inflicted damage totaling an estimated $500.

On 31 December 1941, I-3 sighted what she identified as an aircraft carrier, two cruisers, and several destroyers heading due west 100 nautical miles (190 km; 120 mi) west-southwest of Oahu, but was unable to obtain a firing position on them. On 9 January 1942, she was ordered to divert from her patrol and search for the United States Navy aircraft carrier USS Lexington, which the submarine I-18 had sighted, but she did not find Lexington. She arrived at Kwajalein in company with I-1 and I-2 on 22 January 1942. The three submarines departed Kwajalein on 24 January 1942 bound for Yokosuka, which they reached on 1 February 1942. They underwent a complete overhaul and refit there.

==== Second war patrol ====
While I-3 was at Yokosuka, Submarine Squadron 2 — consisting of I-1, I-2, I-3, I-4, I-6, and I-7, the latter serving as squadron flagship — was assigned to the Dutch East Indies Invasion Force. Accordingly, I-3 departed Yokosuka on 12 February 1942 with the commander of Submarine Division 7 embarked, bound for Palau, where she arrived on 16 February 1942 and refueled from the oiler Fujisan Maru, then got back underway on 17 February in company with I-2 bound for the Netherlands East Indies. The two submarines arrived at Staring Bay on the Southeast Peninsula of Celebes just southeast of Kendari on 22 February 1942, then put back to sea that same afternoon, heading for the Indian Ocean off the southwest coast of Australia, where I-3 was to conduct her second war patrol in the Cape Leeuwin–Shark Bay area. While en route, I-3 sighted an Allied submarine on the surface in the Banda Sea on 23 February 1942, but could not get into a firing position.

On 2 March 1942, I-3 attacked the New Zealand 8,988- or 9,540-gross register ton (sources disagree) armed steamer Narbada on the surface in the Indian Ocean 90 nautical miles (170 km; 100 mi) west-northwest of Fremantle, Australia, at 31°33′S 114°11′E. Although Narbada suffered minor damage from shell fragments, I-3 failed to score any hits on her, and when Narbada fired back, I-3 broke off her attack and submerged at 31°50′S 113°30′E. On 3 March 1942, I-3 encountered the New Zealand 8,719-ton armed steamer Tongariro in the Indian Ocean 90 nautical miles (170 km; 100 mi) west-northwest of Rottnest Island and pursued her on the surface, but when Tongariro — which was nearing the end of a voyage from Wellington, New Zealand, to Fremantle — opened fire, I-3 discontinued the chase and submerged. On 6 March 1942, while heading west-southwest on the surface, I-3 sighted the United States Navy submarine USS S-40, also on the surface and on an intersecting course. Mistaking I-3 for the submarine USS Stingray, S-40 attempted to contact I-3, but I-3 opened fire on her with both deck guns at 24°28′S 112°40′E. S-40 submerged and attempted to gain a firing position on I-3 for a torpedo attack, but I-3 was too far away. I-3 concluded her patrol with her arrival at Penang in Japanese-occupied British Malaya on 14 March 1942.

==== Third war patrol ====
Orders arrived from the headquarters of the Combined Fleet on 15 March 1942 for all the submarines of Submarine Squadron 2 except for I-1 to conduct reconnaissance operations along the coast of Ceylon and western coast of India in preparation for Operation C, the upcoming Indian Ocean raid by the aircraft carriers of the Combined Fleet′s Mobile Force. Accordingly, I-3 departed Penang at 28 March 1942 bound for the waters off Colombo, Ceylon. She sighted a land plane at 13:00 local time on 31 March 1942 at a distance of 195 nautical miles (361 km; 224 mi) from Colombo and bearing 135 degrees from that port, but saw no other aircraft during her approach. She arrived in the Colombo area on 2 April 1942 and began to transmit weather reports for the benefit of the Japanese aircraft carrier force, and at 04:25 local time sighted a lone merchant ship steaming westward 70 nautical miles (130 km; 81 mi) from, and bearing 220 degrees from, Colombo, but found no ships leaving or entering the harbor itself. At 22:00 she reported that she had been unable to penetrate the harbor itself due to heavy patrolling by Allied vessels.

I-3 departed the Colombo area and was not in the vicinity when Mobile Force carrier aircraft struck Colombo on 5 April 1942. Early on the morning of 7 April 1942, she was in the Indian Ocean 150 nautical miles (280 km; 170 mi) west-southwest of Colombo when she sighted five Allied merchant ships heading eastward and then a merchant ship and an oiler, both westbound. After an unsuccessful pursuit, she surfaced at 06°52′N 078°50′E and attacked the British 4,812- or 4,872-ton armed merchant steamer Elmdale, which was on a voyage from Karachi to Colombo. From 02:40, she fired thirty-nine 140-millimeter (5.5 in) rounds and four torpedoes at Elmdale and scored 14 shell hits, but Elmdale survived the encounter. After 01:50 on 8 April 1942, I-3 surfaced 300 nautical miles (560 km; 350 mi) west of Colombo and attacked the 5,051-ton armed merchant ship Fultala, which was on a voyage from Calcutta, India, to Karachi carrying 8,000 tons of coal. She hit Fultala with a Type 89 torpedo, and Fultala sank without loss of life at 06°52′N 076°54′E. Her entire crew was later rescued.

I-3 returned to her patrol area southwest of Colombo on 9 April 1942, then proceeded to Singapore, where she arrived in company with I-7 on 15 April 1942. She got back underway on 21 April 1942 bound for Japan, and arrived at Yokosuka on 1 May 1942.

==== Fourth war patrol ====
While I-3 was at Yokosuka, the Aleutian Islands campaign began on 3–4 June 1942 with a Japanese air raid on Dutch Harbor, Alaska, followed quickly by the unopposed Japanese occupation in the Aleutian Islands of Attu on 5 June and Kiska on 7 June 1942. On 10 June 1842, I-1, I-2, and I-3 were reassigned to the Northern Force for duty in the Aleutians, and on 11 June 1942 I-3 set out for Aleutian waters in company with I-1, I-2, I-6, and I-7 to begin her fourth war patrol. On 20 June 1942, I-1, I-2, and I-3 joined the "K" patrol line in the North Pacific Ocean between 48°N 178°W and 50°N 178°W. She remained on the patrol line until 3 July 1942. On 20 July 1942, she was reassigned to the Advance Force and ordered to return to Japan. She arrived at Yokosuka on 1 August 1942 and underwent repairs there.

==== Guadalcanal campaign ====
During I-3′s stay at Yokosuka, the Guadalcanal campaign began on 7 August 1942 with U.S. amphibious landings on Guadalcanal, Tulagi, Florida Island, Gavutu, and Tanambogo in the southeastern Solomon Islands. Submarine Squadron 2 was disbanded on 20 August 1942 and I-3 was reassigned to Submarine Squadron 1 for operations around Guadalcanal. I-3 left Yokosuka on 8 September 1942 in company with I-1, I-2, I-4, and I-5, stopped at Truk from 15 to 17 September 1942, and proceeded to Shortland Island in the Shortland Islands. While she was at sea, she was reassigned along with I-1 and I-2 to the Outer South Seas Force in the 8th Fleet. On 26 September, I-3 reached Shortland Island, where the destroyers Amagiri and Ayanami had delivered four Daihatsu-class landing craft, each loaded with a Type 88 75-millimeter antiaircraft gun, an artillery tractor, and several Type 96 150-millimeter infantry mortars. The commanding officers of I-2 and I-3 took part in a staff conference to decide on a way of delivering the equipment to the Imperial Japanese Army forces on Guadalcanal, and, after they made their plans, I-2 and I-3 departed on a supply run to Guadalcanal at 03:30 on 27 September 1942, each towing a Daihatsu. They returned to Shortland Island after delivering their cargoes.

Between 3 and 5 October 1942, I-3 attempted three supply runs to Wickham Anchorage on Vangunu and Viru Harbor on New Georgia, but aborted each voyage. She was reassigned to "A" Patrol Group in the Advance Force on 10 October 1942, and while on patrol 110 nautical miles (200 km; 130 mi) south-southeast of San Cristobal on 15 October 1942 transmitted a report at 22:40 that she had sighted several Allied cruisers.

I-3 returned to Truk on 3 November 1942, and while there had her after 140-millimeter (5.5 in) gun replaced with a mounting abaft her conning tower for a waterproof Daihatsu that allowed her to discharge her cargo more quickly. While she was at Truk, the commander of the 6th Fleet, Vice Admiral Teruhisa Komatsu, addressed a meeting of the commanding officers of his fleet′s submarines on 16 November 1942 to inform them that the commander-in-chief of the Combined Fleet, Admiral Isoroku Yamamoto, had ordered the 6th Fleet to organize a system of supply runs to the 17th Army forces fighting on Guadalcanal via submarine.

Assigned to these supply missions, I-3 departed Truk on 19 November 1942 bound for Rabaul with a cargo of 20 tons of food and medicine. She stopped at Rabaul from 22 to 24 November 1942, then proceeded to Shortland Island, which she reached on 25 November 1942. Carrying a waterproof Daihatsu on her new mounting, she departed on 27 November and reached Kamimbo Bay on the northwest coast of Guadalcanal on 28 November 1942. She quickly unloaded the Daihatsu and got back underway for Shortland Island, which she reached on 30 November 1942. On 1 December 1942, she put back to sea on another supply run to Guadalcanal, but when she surfaced off Kamimbo Bay after sunset on 3 December 1942, two Allied motor torpedo boats sighted her and forced her to submerge, and she returned to Shortland Island on 5 December 1942 without delivering her cargo. On 7 December 1942, she got underway from Shortland Island for her sixth supply run to Guadalcanal.

==== Loss ====
On 9 December 1942, I-3 surfaced at Kamimbo Bay, launched her Daihatsu, and began preparations to deliver her cargo. At 06:52, the PT boat PT-59, patrolling the area in company with PT-44, sighted I-3 on the surface with her Daihatsu alongside. At 07:03, PT-59 fired two Mark 15 torpedoes at I-3 at a range of 400 yards (370 m) Her second torpedo missed and passed under PT-44 without detonating, but her first torpedo struck I-3′s stern, resulting in a large explosion. I-3 quickly sank at 09°12′S 159°42′E. Four members of her crew were blown overboard, swam to Guadalcanal, and survived, but the other 90 members of I-3′s crew perished. Over the next 90 minutes, a large oil slick rose to the surface.

The loss of I-3 led the Japanese to suspend submarine supply trips to Guadalcanal on 11 December 1942. I-2, which departed Shortland Island on 9 December 1942 on a supply run to Guadalcanal, aborted her voyage on 11 December and returned to Shortland.

I-3 was stricken from the Navy list on 20 January 1943.
