= Japanese submarine I-7 =

Imperial Japanese Navy J3 type submarine

- I-7 on her commissioning day, 31 March 1937.

History

Imperial Japanese Navy
- Name: I-7
- Ordered: 1934
- Builder: Kure Naval Arsenal, Kure, Japan
- Laid down: 12 September 1934
- Launched: 3 July 1935
- Completed: 31 March 1937
- Commissioned: 31 March 1937
- Fate: Wrecked 22 June 1943
- Stricken: 20 August 1943

General characteristics
- Class & type: J3 type submarine
- Displacement: 2,231 tons (surfaced); 3,583 tons(submerged)
- Length: 109.30 m (358 ft 7 in)
- Beam: 9.10 m (29 ft 10 in)
- Draft: 5.26 m (17 ft 3 in)
- Depth: 7.70 m (25 ft 3 in)
- Propulsion: 2 × Kampon Mk.1A Model 10 diesel engines, 11,200 bhp (9,472 kW); Two electric motors, 2,800 shp (2,368 kW); Two shafts
- Speed: 23 kn (43 km/h; 26 mph) (surfaced); 8 kn (15 km/h; 9.2 mph) (submerged)
- Range: 14,000 nmi (26,000 km; 16,000 mi) at 16 kn (30 km/h; 18 mph) (surfaced); 80 nmi (150 km; 92 mi) at 3 kn (5.6 km/h; 3.5 mph) (submerged)
- Test depth: 100 m (328 ft)
- Complement: 100 officers and men
- Armament: 6 × 533 mm (21 in) torpedo tubes (6 bow); 20 × Type 89 torpedoes; 2 × 140 mm (5.5 in)/40 cal 11th Year-Type guns; 2 × 13.2 mm (0.5 in) machine guns
- Aircraft carried: 1 × Watanabe E9W1
- Aviation facilities: Hangar, catapult

I-7 was an Imperial Japanese Navy J3 type submarine commissioned in 1937. She was a large cruiser submarine that served in World War II. She operated in support of the attack on Pearl Harbor, conducted anti-shipping patrols in the Indian Ocean, supported the Indian Ocean raid, and took part in the Guadalcanal campaign and the Aleutian Islands campaign. She was wrecked in the Aleutian Islands after a lengthy battle with the destroyer USS Monaghan (DD-354) in June 1943.

== Design, construction, and commissioning ==
I-7 was the first of two Junsen III- (or "J3"-) type submarines. After the four Junsen I-type submarines (I-1, I-2, I-3, and I-4), the Japanese had built I-5 as a modified Junsen I, introducing an aviation capability to the Junsen type with the inclusion of a hangar that allowed I-5 to carry and operate a floatplane. I-6, the only Junsen II-type submarine, represented the next step in the evolution of this aviation capability, as she had both a hangar and a catapult for a floatplane. The Japanese designed and equipped the next and last Junsen type submarines, I-7 and I-8 — the only two Junsen III-type submarines — to operate as submarine squadron flagships. In them, the Japanese sought to combine what they viewed as the best features of the earlier Junsen-type submarines with those of the Kaidai V-type submarines. Like I-6 before them, I-7 and I-8 had a hangar and catapult for a floatplane. They were the last Japanese submarines with aircraft facilities abaft the conning tower; all later Japanese submarines with aircraft capabilities had their hangars and catapults on their forward decks.

Built by the Kure Naval Arsenal at Kure, Japan, I-7 was laid down on 12 September 1934. She was launched on 3 July 1935 and was completed and commissioned on 31 March 1937.

== Service history ==
=== Pre-World War II ===
Upon commissioning, I-7 was attached to the Yokosuka Naval District. On 1 December 1937, she became flagship of Submarine Squadron 1 in the 1st Fleet, a component of the Combined Fleet. She became flagship of Submarine Squadron 4 in the 1st Fleet on 15 November 1939, and on 11 October 1940 she was one of 98 Imperial Japanese Navy ships that gathered along with more than 500 aircraft on the Japanese coast at Yokohama Bay for an Imperial fleet review — the largest fleet review in Japanese history — in honor of the 2,600th anniversary of the enthronement of the Emperor Jimmu, Japan's legendary first emperor.

I-7 became flagship of Submarine Squadron 2 in the 6th Fleet, a component of the Combined Fleet, on 15 November 1940. While taking part in maneuvers in Saeki Bay on the morning of 21 October 1941, she collided with the submarine I-66. Both submarines suffered light damage.

On 10 November 1941 — by which time I-7 was serving in the 6th Fleet as flagship of Submarine Squadron 2 and was assigned to Submarine Division 8 with the submarines I-4, I-5, and I-6. — the commander of the 6th Fleet, Vice Admiral Mitsumi Shimizu, gathered the commanding officers of the fleet's submarines together for a meeting aboard his flagship, the light cruiser Katori, which was anchored in Saeki Bay. His chief of staff briefed them on the upcoming attack on Pearl Harbor, which would bring Japan and the United States into World War II. On 11 November 1941, I-7 was reassigned to the Submarine Advance Force.

As the Imperial Japanese Navy began to deploy on 16 November 1941 for the upcoming conflict in the Pacific, I-7 embarked both the commander of Submarine Squadron 2 and a Watanabe E9W1 (Allied reporting name "Slim") reconnaissance seaplane. At 13:00 that day, I-4, I-5, I-6, and I-7 got underway from Yokosuka bound for the Hawaiian Islands. While 300 nautical miles (560 km; 350 mi) north of Oahu, I-7 received the message "Climb Mount Niitaka 1208" (Japanese: Niitakayama nobore 1208) from the Combined Fleet on 2 December 1941, indicating that war with the Allies would commence on 8 December 1941 Japan time, which was on 7 December 1941 on the other side of the International Date Line in Hawaii.

=== World War II ===
==== First war patrol ====
On 7 December 1941, the submarines of Submarine Squadron 2 took up patrol stations across a stretch of the Pacific Ocean from northeast to northwest of Oahu, with I-7 operating as their flagship. The submarines had orders to conduct reconnaissance in the area and attack any ships which sortied from Pearl Harbor during or after the attack, which occurred that morning. On 10 December 1941, Katori transmitted a message from Shimizu to the squadron commander ordering I-7′s floatplane to conduct a reconnaissance flight over Pearl Harbor to report on damage inflicted during the attack three days earlier and the progress the Americans were making on repairs. Accordingly, I-7 launched her floatplane early on the morning of 16 December 1941 from a position 26 nautical miles (48 km; 30 mi) west of Kailua-Kona on the island of Hawaii. At 07:10, the floatplane's observer reported four battleships — one of them heavily damaged — and an aircraft carrier in Pearl Harbor off the East Loch anchorage and five cruisers and 30 smaller vessels including three destroyers in the harbor south of Ford Island. The floatplane returned to I-7 and landed next to her at 09:45 and, after its two-man crew abandoned the plane and swam to the submarine, I-7 scuttled the plane, submerged, and left the area.

On 17 December 1941, I-7 received orders to move to an operating area southwest of Oahu to support a sweep line by Submarine Squadron 2. Detached from that duty on 21 December 1941, she shifted to a patrol area southeast of Oahu. While 120 nautical miles (220 km; 140 mi) southeast of Oahu on 1 January 1942, I-7 sighted a light cruiser and two destroyers steaming toward Pearl Harbor and fired two torpedoes at them, both of which missed. The destroyers counterattacked, dropping six depth charges, but I-7 escaped unscathed. On 9 January 1942, the submarine I-18 reported sighting the aircraft carrier USS Lexington (CV-2) northeast of Johnston Island, and I-7 diverted from her patrol to take part in the hunt for Lexington, but failed to find her. She then headed for Kwajalein, which she reached on 22 January 1942. She got back underway on 24 January 1942 bound for Yokosuka, which she reached on 2 February 1942.

==== Second war patrol ====
While I-7 was at Yokosuka, Submarine Squadron 2 — consisting of I-1, I-2, I-3, I-4, I-5, I-6, and I-7 — was assigned to the Dutch East Indies Invasion Force in the Southeast Area Force on 8 February 1942, operating as Submarine Group C with I-7 designated the group's flagship. I-7 departed Yokosuka on 11 February 1942 bound for Palau, which she reached on 16 February, then got back underway on 17 February 1942 for the Netherlands East Indies. She arrived at Staring Bay on the Southeast Peninsula of Celebes just southeast of Kendari on 21 February 1942. At 06:00 local time on 23 February 1942, she began her second war patrol with the commander of Submarine Group C embarked, bound for a patrol area in the Indian Ocean south of Java. I-4, I-5, I-6, and I-7 formed a sweep line 400 nautical miles (740 km; 460 mi) south of Java to interdict Allied shipping between Java and Australia, after which Submarine Group C patrolled south of the Cocos (Keeling) Islands.

At 12:30 on 2 March 1942, I-7 was operating in the Indian Ocean 150 nautical miles (280 km; 170 mi) southwest of the Cocos Islands when an unidentified Japanese carrier aircraft attacked her by mistake. She suffered no damage. At 10:00 on 4 March 1942, she surfaced in the Indian Ocean 250 nautical miles (460 km; 290 mi) northwest of the Cocos Islands and opened fire with her deck guns on the Dutch 865-ton motor vessel Merkus, a merchant ship on a voyage from Tjilatjap, Java, to Colombo, Ceylon, with a cargo of rubber. Merkus′s crew abandoned ship without loss of life, after which I-7 sank the ship with gunfire at 08°40′S 094°30′E. She concluded her patrol with her arrival at Penang in Japanese-occupied British Malaya on 8 March 1942.

==== Indian Ocean raid ====
Orders arrived from the headquarters of the Combined Fleet for all the submarines of Submarine Squadron 2 except for I-1 to conduct reconnaissance operations along the coast of Ceylon and western coast of India in preparation for Operation C, the upcoming Indian Ocean raid by the aircraft carriers of the Combined Fleet's Mobile Force. Accordingly, I-7 departed Penang at 16:00 local time on 28 March 1942 with a Watanabe E9W1 (Allied reporting name "Slim") floatplane embarked. She was tasked to use the aircraft to conduct a reconnaissance of Colombo and Trincomalee, Ceylon, on 3 April 1942, two days before the scheduled Japanese carrier air strikes there.

At 05:17 on 1 April 1942, a Royal Air Force Catalina I flying boat, probably from No. 201 Squadron, attacked I-7 while she was on the surface in the Indian Ocean 180 nautical miles (330 km; 210 mi) southeast of Ceylon. The Catalina dropped two bombs which landed close aboard, but I-7 suffered no damage. Four hours later she encountered several small Allied patrol vessels in the same area, and her commanding officer decided to cancel the reconnaissance flight scheduled for 3 April because of the enemy activity in the launch area. Instead, I-7 provided weather reports to the approaching Mobile Force.

At 03:40 on 3 April 1942, I-7 attacked the British 9,415-ton motor vessel Glenshiel in the Indian Ocean 300 nautical miles (560 km; 350 mi) east of the Maldive Islands. I-7 fired two Type 89 torpedoes at Glenshiel, which was on a voyage from Bombay, India, to Fremantle, Australia, carrying 12 passengers and 1,000 tons of general cargo. One torpedo hit Glenshiel on her port side, and she began to settle by the stern. Glenshiel transmitted a distress signal and her crew and passengers — all of whom survived — abandoned ship. After waiting for the lifeboats to clear the ship, I-7 fired two more torpedoes, one of which hit. She then surfaced and opened fire on the ship with her deck guns, scoring 20 shell hits before the burning Glenshiel sank by the stern at 00°48′S 078°33′E.

Reassigned to the Advance Force on 10 April 1942, I-7 arrived at Singapore along with I-3 on 15 April 1942. She got back underway on 21 April 1942 and arrived at Yokosuka on 1 May 1942 to undergo repairs.

==== Third war patrol ====
While I-7 was at Yokosuka, the Aleutian Islands campaign began on 3–4 June 1942 with a Japanese air raid on Dutch Harbor, Alaska, followed quickly by the unopposed Japanese occupation in the Aleutian Islands of Attu on 5 June and Kiska on 7 June 1942. On 10 June 1942, I-1, I-2, I-3, I-4, I-5, I-6, and I-7 were reassigned to the Northern Force for duty in the Aleutians, and on 11 June 1942 I-7 set out for Aleutian waters to begin her third war patrol. She joined the "K" patrol line and patrolled off Unalaska Island. She was in the Gulf of Alaska on 14 July 1942 when she torpedoed the 2,722-ton United States Army Transport USAT Arcata, which was on a voyage from Bethel, Alaska, to Seattle, Washington. She then attacked Arcata with gunfire, her gun crew finding accuracy difficult in the choppy seas. After one of I-7′s shells hit Arcata′s bridge, her passengers and crew abandoned ship. Seven members of Arcata′s crew were killed. Japanese records claim I-7 ceased fire when she spotted life rafts in the water, while Arcata′s survivors reported that I-7 machine-gunned the life rafts, killing one crewman. Arcata sank at 53°41′N 157°45′W.

I-7 was assigned to the Advance Force on 20 July 1942. Her patrol ended with her arrival on 1 August 1942 at Yokosuka, where she began an overhaul.

==== Fourth war patrol ====
During I-7′s stay at Yokosuka, the Guadalcanal campaign began on 7 August 1942 with U.S. amphibious landings on Guadalcanal, Tulagi, Florida Island, Gavutu, and Tanambogo in the southeastern Solomon Islands. On 20 August 1942, Submarine Squadron 2 was disbanded and I-7 was assigned directly to 6th Fleet headquarters. She was again reassigned, to Submarine Division 7, on 31 August 1942. With the commander of Submarine Division 7 and a Watanabe E9W1 (Allied reporting name "Slim") floatplane embarked, she departed Yokosuka on 8 September 1942 bound for Truk, which she reached on 15 September 1942. Upon arrival there, she was assigned to the 1st Picket Unit. With the commander of Submarine Division 7 still aboard, she got back underway on 19 September 1942 to begin her fourth war patrol, assigned a patrol line southeast of San Cristobal in the Solomon Islands.

On 10 October 1942, I-7 was diverted from her patrol to conduct a reconnaissance of Espiritu Santo prior to a planned raid there by a Special Landing Unit put ashore by I-1. On 13 October 1942, her floatplane made a reconnaissance flight over Espiritu Santo, reporting two light cruisers, seven transports, several smaller vessels, and seaplanes off the island's south coast. I-7 bombarded Espiritu Santo after dark on 14 October 1942, firing fourteen 140-millimeter (5.5 in) rounds. Before sunrise on 23 October 1942 she again bombarded the island, but fired only six rounds before return fire by coastal artillery forced her to submerge.

On 24 October 1942 I-7 was ordered to return to rejoin the "A" patrol group southeast of Guadalcanal, but she again received orders on 31 October 1942 to launch a reconnaissance flight over Espiritu Santo. Her floatplane was damaged and could not carry out the flight, but I-7 did conduct a periscope reconnaissance of Espiritu Santo on 7 November 1942. After the submarine I-9, carrying a Yokosuka E14Y1 (Allied reporting name "Glen") floatplane, relieved her off Espiritu Santo, I-7 received orders on 9 November 1942 to reconnoiter Ndeni and Vanikoro in the Santa Cruz Islands. She conducted a periscope reconnaissance of Ndeni on 10 November 1942, finding nothing important, and her floatplane made a reconnaissance flight over Vanikoro on 11 November 1942. She then proceeded to Truk, which she reached on 18 November 1942.

I-7 departed Truk on 24 November 1942. On 1 December 1942, she arrived at Yokosuka for an extended stay.

==== Aleutian Islands campaign ====
On 1 April 1943, Submarine Division 7 was reassigned to the 5th Fleet for service in the North Pacific. Tasked with running supplies and reinforcements to the isolated Japanese garrisons on Attu and Kiska in the Aleutian Islands, I-7 departed Yokosuka on 21 April 1943 with a cargo of food and ammunition bound for Kiska. She called at Kiska on 1 May 1943, unloaded her cargo, and got underway the same day for Attu, which she reached on 4 May 1943. Leaving Attu the same day, she stopped briefly at Paramushiro in the Kuril Islands on 8 May 1943, then proceeded to Yokosuka, arriving there on 12 May 1943. During her voyage, U.S. forces landed on Attu on 11 May 1943, beginning the Battle of Attu.

With the commander of Submarine Division 7 embarked, I-7 departed Yokosuka on 18 May 1943 both to carry supplies to the Japanese forces fighting on Attu and conduct her fifth war patrol. By the time she arrived in the Attu area on 21 May 1943, the situation on Attu had deteriorated to the point that the Japanese Imperial General Headquarters decided to abandon the garrison on Attu — which American forces eventually annihilated, securing the island on 30 May 1943 — and evacuate the isolated garrison on Kiska by submarine, with the evacuation to begin on 26 May 1943. On 24 May 1943, I-7 departed her patrol area off Attu to head for Kiska, and she received orders on 25 May 1943 confirming that decision. When she arrived off Kiska on 26 May 1943, she found the harbor under air attack. She waited at sea until 22:30, then entered the harbor and discharged a cargo of six tons of food, 13.2-mm, 8-mm, and 7.7-mm ammunition, and a radio beacon. After embarking 60 mostly sick and wounded passengers — 49 naval personnel, seven Imperial Japanese Army personnel, and four paramilitary workers — as well as 28 boxes containing the cremated remains of soldiers and four tons of spent shell cartridges, she put back to sea at 01:00 on 27 May 1943 and headed for Paramushiro, arriving there on 1 June 1943. The oiler Teiyō Maru refueled I-7 and the submarines I-21, I-155, I-156, and I-157 on 2 June 1943.

On 4 June 1943, I-7 got underway from Paramushiro for another supply run to Kiska. Calling there on 8 June 1943 along with the submarine I-34, she unloaded nine tons of ammunition and 15 tons of food, embarked 101 passengers — 42 naval personnel, 18 army personnel, and 41 paramilitary workers — and began her return to Paramushiro, which she reached on 13 June 1943.

I-7 once again embarked the commander of Submarine Division 7 for her next supply run, leaving Paramushiro at 16:00 on 15 June 1943. While she was at sea on 17 June, the commander of Submarine Squadron 1 issued a directive ordering I-7, I-34, and the submarines I-36 and I-169 to suspend their supply runs to Kiska and await further orders because of the grounding on 16 June 1943 of I-157 and recent attacks on Japanese submarines in the Aleutians by radar-equipped American destroyers. Submarine Squadron 1 directed I-2, I-157, and the submarine I-175 to determine the locations of the American ships.

Under pressure from higher command to continue the supply and evacuation of Kiska, Submarine Squadron 1 reversed its decision on 18 June 1943 and ordered the resumption of the submarine supply runs. On 19 June 1943, I-7 arrived off Kiska, but found Gertrude Cove in Vega Bay shrouded in dense fog. Her commanding officer decided to delay her attempt to land her cargo.

==== Loss ====
I-7 surfaced off Kiska approximately 1 nautical mile (1.9 km; 1.2 mi) south of Vega Bay in heavy fog at 19:00 on 20 June 1943 and began an attempt to enter the anchorage at Gertrude Cove. The destroyer USS Monaghan (DD-354), patrolling 2 nautical miles (3.7 km; 2.3 mi) off Bukhti Point, detected I-7 on radar at a range of 14,000 yards (12,800 m) and began to close the range. I-7 lacked radar and was unaware that Monaghan was in the vicinity until 19:20, when her sound operator reported hearing propeller noises to starboard, and I-7 began preparations to dive. At 19:30, Monaghan opened radar-directed gunfire 1 nautical mile (1.9 km; 1.2 mi) south of the anchorage at a range of 2,000 yards (1,800 m). Taken by surprise, I-7 prepared to crash-dive when her crew heard Monaghan′s first shot, but two 5-inch (127 mm) shells immediately hit the starboard side of I-7′s conning tower, holing it and killing the submarine division commander, I-7′s commanding officer, navigation officer, and helmsman, and two of I-7′s non-commissioned officers. I-7′s communications officer was wounded.

I-7′s torpedo officer took command. He ordered I-7 to remain on the surface, man her guns, and return fire. I-7 fired thirty 140-millimeter (5.5 in) rounds from her deck guns and 250 rounds from her machine guns. Her crew had left her aft ballast tanks open by mistake, causing her to flood, take on a heavy list, and become stern-heavy. At around 19:45 she ran aground at Bukhti Point. Her torpedo officer ordered her crew to abandon ship, and her paymaster destroyed her secret documents and smashed her coding machine, whose pieces he threw overboard. Meanwhile, a Japanese Daihatsu-class landing craft sent to unload cargo from I-7 arrived in the area and tried to contact I-7 in the thick fog by signal lamp but came under machine-gun fire from Monaghan and withdrew.

Using a portable transmitter, I-7 contacted Japanese forces ashore on Kiska at 02:00 on 21 June 1943. Two Daihatsus arrived from Gertrude Cove with welding equipment, which I-7′s crew used to patch the hole in her conning tower. The Daihatsus also took aboard some of I-7′s cargo for delivery ashore. As acting commanding officer, the torpedo officer convened a meeting of surviving officers, who decided to make a high-speed run on the surface to Yokosuka, with a possible stop at Paramushiro. With her repairs complete at 18:45, I-7 entered Gertrude Cove by 19:00, unloaded the rest of her cargo and the bodies of deceased personnel and took aboard new code books. She got underway at midnight on 21/22 June 1943.

Monaghan was patrolling in heavy fog south of Kiska when she again detected I-7 on radar at a range of 14,000 yards (12,800 m) at 00:35 on 22 June 1943. She closed the range, and at 01:30 opened radar-directed gunfire when I-7 was about 10 nautical miles (19 km; 12 mi) south of Vega Bay. Again taking I-7 by surprise, Monaghan scored several hits, including on the port side of I-7′s conning tower, on her deck gun bulwark, and in her aft ballast tanks, killing her engineering officer and severely wounding her acting commanding officer. Her lookouts mistakenly reported her to be under fire from three different directions by three different ships. I-7′s gunnery officer, a lieutenant junior grade, took command and ordered her crew to return fire with her deck guns and machine guns, and I-7′s lookouts reported seeing a fire on one of the three ships they thought they had sighted. Monaghan ceased fire after 10 minutes.

Monaghan resumed firing at 02:10, this time illuminating I-7 with star shells. At around 02:18, she scored a hit which disabled I-7′s steering engine, and I-7 began a wide turn to port back towards Kiska. Another hit detonated the ready-use ammunition for I-7′s deck guns, which started a small fire. The ventilation intakes for I-7′s diesel engines sucked in flames from the fire, threatening to set the galley and forward head ablaze. Two other hits breached the aft deck casing on I-7′s port side, causing flooding which resulted in the submarine taking on a 30-degree list. I-7′s crew suffered heavy casualties, and at 02:30, I-7′s acting commanding officer ordered her to return to Kiska. Monaghan soon broke off her pursuit of I-7 to avoid the danger of running aground off Kiska.

I-7′s crew had fired seventy 140-millimeter (5.5 in) shells and about 2,000 rounds from her machine guns during her battle with Monaghan. In danger of sinking, she reported her damage and estimated time of arrival to the Japanese forces on Kiska at 03:10. At 03:15, she ran aground on the Twin Rocks off Vega Bay at 51°49′N 177°20′E. She sank quickly by the stern, trapping a number of men inside, and came to rest with the forward 50 feet (15 m) of her hull out of the water. She had lost 87 officers and men killed in combat with Monaghan or when she sank after running aground. A Daihatsu arrived at 06:30 and took off her 43 survivors.

On 23 June 1943, a Daihatsu arrived on the scene, and divers from it attempted to retrieve the codebooks aboard I-7 when she sank. Her surviving crew members had last seen a bag containing the code books and other secret documents suspended on a ladder at her No. 3 after access hatch, but the divers were unable to locate the books. The Daihatsu then used demolition charges to scuttle I-7′s bow section.

I-7 was stricken from the Navy list on 20 August 1943.

== Aftermath ==
The Japanese completed the evacuation of Kiska on 28 July 1943, and on 15 August 1943 the Allies invaded the undefended island in Operation Cottage. On 26 August 1943, the U.S. Navy fleet tug USS Ute (ATF-76) arrived to investigate I-7′s wreck. Her divers found I-7′s wreck lying on its port side in 60 feet (18 m) of water. Although the conning tower was damaged, I-7′s number was visible on a tarpaulin on the conning tower's side.

On 7 September 1943, the U.S. Navy submarine rescue ship USS Florikan (ASR-9) arrived and began diving operations on the wreck that lasted for a month. By the time the operations concluded in October 1943, seven divers had entered I-7′s wreck and recovered valuable intelligence documents from it.
