= Type J1 submarine =

1926 Japanese cruiser submarine class

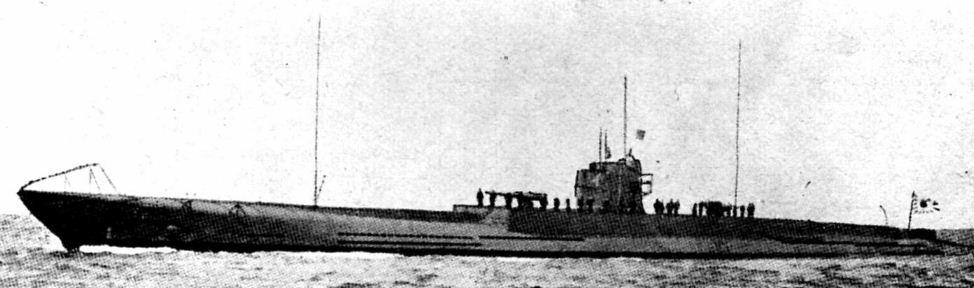
- I-1 in 1930

Class overview
- Operators: Imperial Japanese Navy
- Succeeded by: Type J1M submarine
- In service: 1926 - 1944
- Completed: I-1, I-2, I-3, I-4

General characteristics
- Displacement: 2135 tons (surfaced) 2,791 tons (submerged)
- Length: 320 ft (98 m)
- Beam: 30 ft (9.1 m)
- Draught: 16.5 ft (5.0 m)
- Propulsion: twin shaft MAN 10 cylinder 4 stroke diesels giving 6000 bhp two electric motors of 2600 ehp
- Speed: 18 knots (surface) 8 knots (submerged)
- Range: 24,400 nm at 10 knots
- Test depth: 80 m (260 feet)
- Complement: 68 officers and men
- Armament: two 14 cm/40 11th Year Type naval guns fore and aft; 8 × 533mm torpedo tubes (6 forward, 2 aft); 20 × type 95 oxygen-driven torpedoes

The Type J1 submarine (巡潜1型潜水艦, Junsen ichi-gata sensuikan, "Cruiser submarine Type 1"), also called I-1-class submarine (伊一型潜水艦, I-ichi-gata sensuikan) were large cruiser submarines (Junsen type submarines) of the Imperial Japanese Navy.

Four boats were built between 1926 and 1929. These boats, based on the KD2 and U-139 designs, were of a junsen, or cruiser, type with an impressive range of 24,000 nm. Elderly by 1941 they were among the first Japanese submarines converted to supply duty.

- I-1 was present during the attack on Pearl Harbor and witnessed the Doolittle Raid on Tokyo, before patrolling the Aleutians. Her aft 14 cm gun was then removed to make room for a 46-foot (14 m) daihatsu cargo barge and she started shifting supplies in the Solomon Islands. On 29 January 1943, the New Zealand naval trawlers, Kiwi and Moa rammed and wrecked her in shallow water at Kamimbo Bay, Guadalcanal. A common rumor is that critical codes remained on board and the US Navy salvaged 200,000 pages of intelligence: code books, charts, manuals, and the ship's log. But this is due to a typo made in an intelligence report.
- I-2 was sunk by the destroyer USS Saufley off New Ireland on 7 April 1944.
- I-3 was ambushed off Guadalcanal by PT-59 and PT-44 on 10 December 1942.
- I-4 was torpedoed off New Ireland by USS Seadragon on 21 December 1942.

== See also ==
- Junsen type submarine
- Ha-101-class submarine
- Imperial Japanese Army Railways and Shipping Section
