= Type 92 torpedo =

The Type 92 torpedo was a submarine-launched torpedo used by the Imperial Japanese Navy during World War II.

== Characteristics ==
It was 7.14 m (23 ft 5 in) long and 53 cm (21 in) in diameter and was battery powered. It could deliver a 300 kg (660 lb) warhead at 55 km/h (30 kn) to a target 7 km (4.3 mi) away.
