= Patrol torpedo boat PT-121 =

Patrol vessel of the United States Navy

History

United States
- Name: PT-121
- Builder: Electric Launch Company, Bayonne, New Jersey
- Laid down: 25 April 1942
- Launched: 25 July 1942
- Commissioned: 27 August 1942
- Nickname(s): "SNAFU"
- Fate: Sunk, 27 March 1944

General characteristics
- Class & type: Elco 80-foot PT boat
- Displacement: 56 long tons (57 t)
- Length: 80 ft (24 m)
- Beam: 20 ft 8 in (6.30 m)
- Draft: 5 ft (1.5 m)
- Propulsion: 3 × 1,500 shp (1,119 kW) Packard W-14 M2500 gasoline engines, three shafts
- Speed: 41 knots (76 km/h; 47 mph)
- Complement: 17 (3 officers, 14 enlisted)
- Armament: 4 × 21 in (533 mm) torpedoes; 1 × 40 mm guns; 2 × twin .50 cal (12.7 mm) machine guns

Service record
- Part of: MTB Squadron 6; (August 1942–December 1942); MTB Division 17; (August 1942–April 1943); MTB Squadron 8; (April 1943–March 1944)
- Commanders: Ens. Richard B. Secrest, USNR

PT-121 was a motor torpedo boat of the United States Navy, built by the Electric Launch Company (ELCO) of Bayonne, New Jersey, launched in 1942, and sunk by air attack in a friendly fire incident on 27 March 1944.

== Service history ==
On the morning of 27 March 1944, Lt. Crowell C. Hall, USNR, executive officer of Squadron 25, in PT-353 (Ens. George H. Guckert, USNR), with PT-121 (Ens. Richard B. Secrest, USNR), was trying to thread a way through New Britain's reefs to Ewasse (now in Bialla Rural LLG, Papua New Guinea), in Bangula Bay, to investigate a reported enemy schooner. At 0745, four P-40 fighters of 78 Squadron, Royal Australian Air Force operating out of Kiriwina, flew over and Lieutenant Hall asked them by radio to investigate the schooner. The aircraft complied, and reported it had been strafed previously and was no longer a worthwhile target. No sooner had the boats turned to leave than they were attacked by four other P-40s of 78 Squadron and a Beaufighter heavy fighter of 30 Squadron RAAF. A second Beaufighter recognized the PTs and throughout the attack attempted to call off the other Beaufighter by radio and to maneuver to head off the P-40s.

No order to open fire was given on either boat. After the aircraft made several runs, gunners on the PT-353 fired seven or eight rounds of 40 mm and five rounds of 37 mm, and those on the PT-121 fired seven rounds of 20 mm and three short bursts of .50 caliber gunfire. Lieutenant Hall on the PT-353 and Ensign Secrest on the PT-121 stopped the firing immediately. Both boats burned, exploded, and sank, except for a portion of the bow of the PT-121. Shortly after the attack, two P-40s of the group that had investigated the schooner returned. They dropped a liferaft to the survivors and sent in a radio report of the tragedy. Five hours later, a P-40 guided PT-346 and PT-354 to the survivors.

Four officers and four enlisted men were dead; four officers and eight enlisted men were wounded; two PTs were completely destroyed.

In part, the losses were caused by a failure in communication. The message reporting the intended movements of PTs had been placed in the wrong file at 78 Squadron headquarters, so the pilots had not been told that PTs would be operating in the area. In part, the losses were caused by failure of the pilots to recognize the PTs. The first P-40s recognized them and gave them a helping hand. One Beaufighter in the second group recognized them and tried to stop the attack. The other pilots simply mistook them for enemy craft.

After an investigation by the Navy, Ensign Secrest received the Navy Cross.
