= Teruhisa Komatsu =

Japanese admiral

Marquis Teruhisa Komatsu
- 小松 輝久
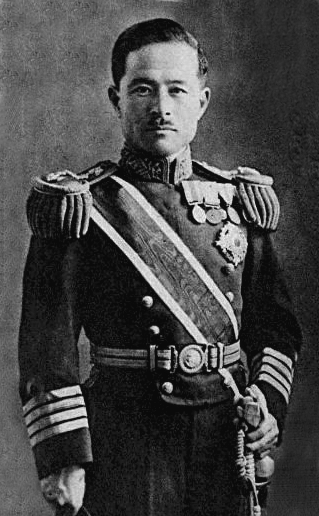
- Born: August 12, 1888; Tokyo
- Died: November 15, 1970 (aged 81)
- Military career
- Allegiance: Empire of Japan
- Branch: Imperial Japanese Navy
- Service years: 1909–1945
- Rank: Vice Admiral
- Commands: Hokaze, Itsukushima, Jingei, Kiso, Nachi, 1st Submarine Squadron, Naval Submarine School, Ryojun Guard District, 1st China Expeditionary Fleet, 6th Fleet, Sasebo Naval District, Naval Academy
- Conflicts: World War II; Pacific War; Battle of Midway; Guadalcanal campaign

Marquis Teruhisa Komatsu (小松 輝久, Komatsu Teruhisa; 12 August 1888 – 15 November 1970) was an admiral in the Imperial Japanese Navy in World War II.

Born as HIH Kitashirakawa-no-miya Teruhisa, as the younger son of HIH Prince Kitashirakawa Yoshihisa, his title was devolved from royal status that that of the kazoku peerage in 1910 in order to preserve the Komatsu family line, which had become extinct with the death of Prince Komatsu Akihito in 1908.

== Biography ==
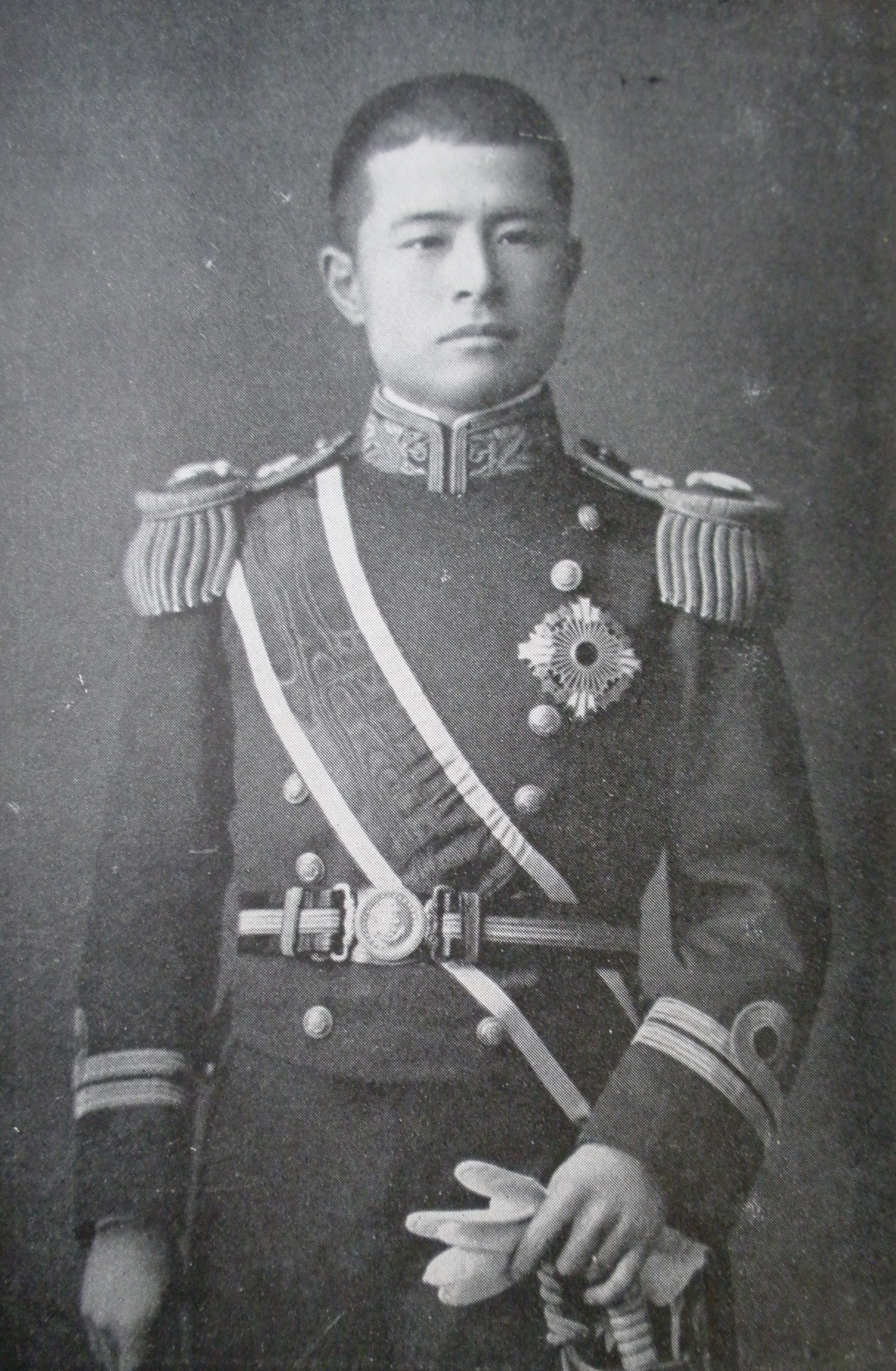
Teruhisa in 1916

Komatsu graduated from the 37th class of the Imperial Japanese Naval Academy in 1909 ranked 26th out of 179 cadets. He performed his midshipman training on the cruiser Aso, and after commissioning as an ensign, he served as a crewman on the battleship Satsuma.

As a sub-lieutenant Komatsu attended naval artillery and torpedo schools and served on the Kawachi in 1912. In 1913, he took time out from the navy to fulfill the obligation of members of his social class to sit for a session in the House of Peers. He later served on the cruiser Soya and battlecruiser Kurama.

After his promotion to lieutenant on 13 December 1915, Komatsu was assigned to the Kongō, destroyers Yūgure and Urakaze and battleship Yamashiro for patrols during World War I.

After graduating from the Naval War College (Japan) in 1919, Komatsu was promoted to lieutenant commander. He subsequently served in a number of staff positions, and traveled to the United Kingdom for further studies in 1925 for over two years at his own expense, during which time he was promoted to commander. After his return to Japan, he received his first command: the destroyer Hokaze from 1 April 1927 – 1 December 1927. He was subsequently executive officer on the cruiser Isuzu in 1929, and then battleship Nagato in 1930.

Promoted to captain on 1 December 1930, Komatsu commanded minelayer Itsukushima in 1931, submarine tender Jingei in 1932, light cruiser Kiso in 1933, and heavy cruiser Nachi in 1935.

After his promotion to rear admiral on 1 December 1936, Komatsu commanded the 1st Submarine Squadron (SubRon 1) in 1937, and was Commandant of the Kure Submarine Warfare School in 1937.

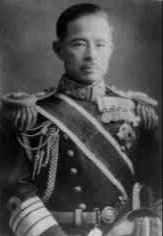
Vice Admiral Komatsu Teruhisa (1940-45)

As a vice admiral from 15 November 1940, Komatsu commanded the Ryojun Guard District in 1941, and was commander-in-chief of the 1st China Expeditionary Fleet from 5 July 1941. After the outbreak of the Pacific War in December 1941, he was reassigned as commander-in-chief of the 6th Fleet, effectively controlling Japanese submarine operations, from 16 March 1942 to 21 June 1943, including during the Battle of Midway in June 1942 and the Guadalcanal campaign of August 1942–February 1943. From June 1943 to November 1944, he was commander of the Sasebo Naval District. In the last part of 1944, he was Commandant of the Imperial Japanese Naval Academy. He retired from active service in May 1945.
