= Headquarters unit =

Specialized unit which supports the commanding officer of a larger military unit

A headquarters unit is a specialised military unit formed around the headquarters of a commanding officer and the requirements of that position. As such, a headquarters unit is always a component of a larger unit.

Examples include:

- headquarters battalion (controlling a regiment, brigade or larger unit);
- headquarters company (controlling a battalion);
- headquarters platoon (controlling a company)

Specific examples include:

- Headquarters and headquarters company (US Army)
- Headquarters and service company (US Marine Corps)

== See also ==
- Corporate headquarters
