= Staring-baai =

Coordinates: 4°5′14″S 122°43′32″E

- Interactive map of Staring-baai

Staring-baai (Dutch for Staring Bay) is a bay off the southeast peninsula of Sulawesi in Indonesia. It lies slightly southeast of Kendari, the provincial capital of South East Sulawesi, where it opens to the east onto the Banda Sea.

During World War II, the bay was a refueling checkpoint for warships of the Imperial Japanese Navy (when the island was generally called Celebes). Sorties out of Staring-baai included the air raids on Darwin, February 19, 1942 and the later Indian Ocean raid against Allied forces and shipping around Ceylon.

By 1949 it was regarded as an unimportant anchorage owing to it being adjacent to mountainous land and sparsely populated. The bay measures 6 miles (9.7 km) across.
