= Japanese submarines in the Pacific War =

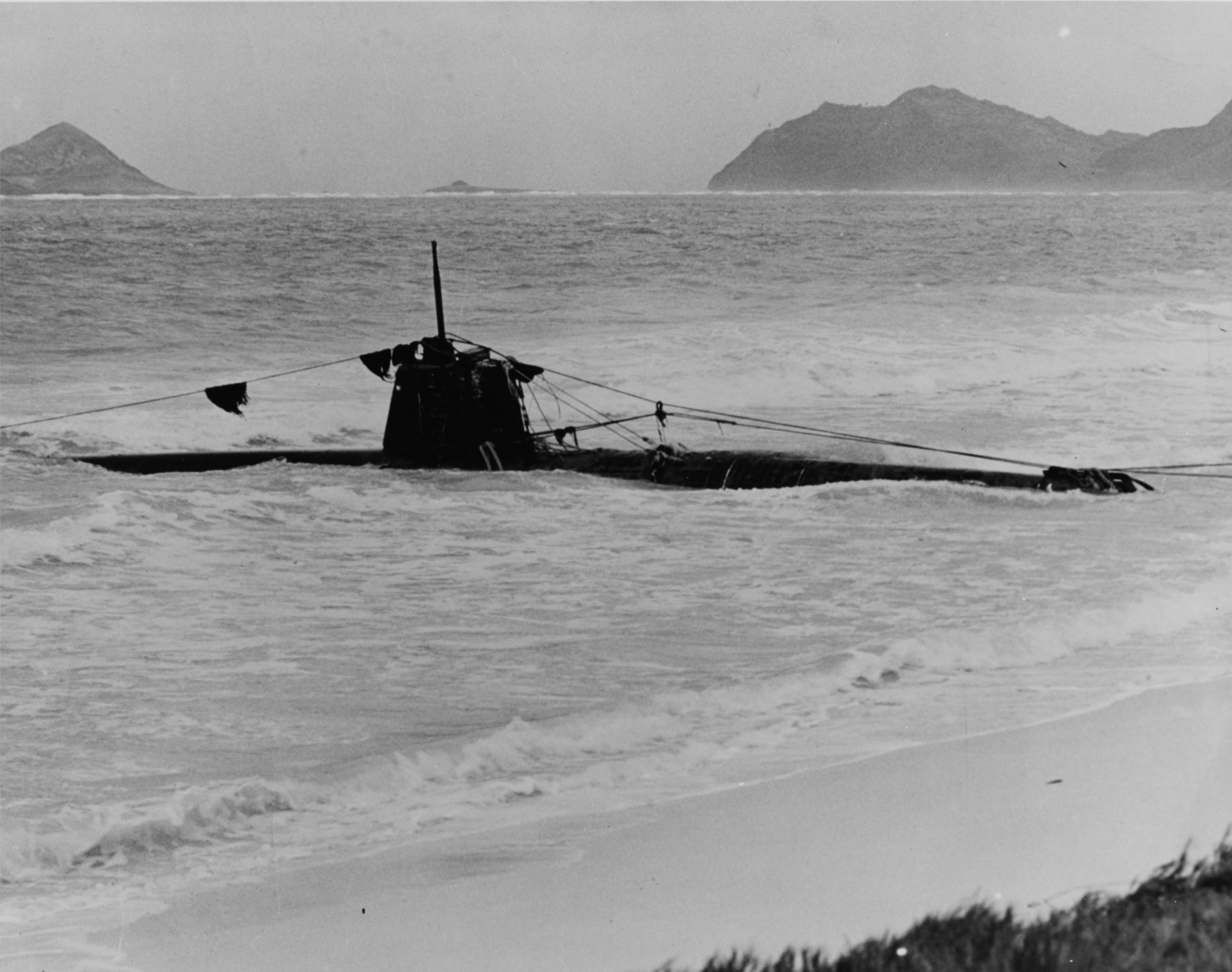
A Japanese midget submarine grounded on Oahu Beach, Hawaii, 1941.

Japanese submarines in the Pacific War of World War II consisted of 176 boats of the Imperial Japanese Navy. During the war Japanese submarines sank two US aircraft carriers, a cruiser and numerous other warships. Later they became used to resupply isolated island garrisons. The Japanese began the war with an advanced submarine torpedo design, the Type 95.

== History ==
Imperial Japanese Navy (IJN) submarines formed by far the most varied fleet of submarines of World War II, including manned torpedoes (Kaiten), midget submarines (Kō-hyōteki, Kairyū), medium-range submarines, purpose-built supply submarines (many used by the Imperial Japanese Army, see Type 3), fleet submarines (many of which carried an aircraft), submarines with the highest submerged speeds of the conflict (Sentaka I-201-class), and submarines able to carry multiple bombers (World War II's largest submarine, the Sentoku I-400-class). They were also equipped with the advanced oxygen-fuelled Type 95 Torpedo (which are sometimes confused with the famed Type 93 Long Lance torpedo). Overall, despite their advanced technical innovation, Japanese submarines were built in relatively small numbers, and had less effect on the war than those of the other major navies.

Paul Wenneker, the German naval attaché in Japan, suggested that Japanese submarines be used to attack American supply ships traveling between the U.S. West Coast and Hawaii, as Germany's U-boats were doing in the Atlantic. The Japanese rejected his advice, believing that submarines should only be used to attack U.S. Navy warships. The Imperial Japanese Navy's doctrine of fleet warfare (guerre d'escadre) resulted in its submarines seldom posing a threat to allied merchant convoys and shipping lanes, in contrast to the Kriegsmarine's U-boats who pursued commerce raiding against Allied and neutral merchant ships. During the war, IJN submarines sunk only about 1 million tons (GRT) of merchant shipping (184 ships) in the Pacific; by contrast U.S. Navy submarines sank 5.2 million tons (1,314 ships) in the same period, while U-boats of Nazi Germany's Kriegsmarine, the IJN's Axis partner, sank 14.3 million tons (2,840 ships) in the Atlantic and other oceans.

The IJN pursued the doctrine of guerre d'escadre (fleet vs fleet warfare), and consequently submarines were often used in offensive roles against warships. Warships were more difficult to attack and sink than merchant ships, however, because naval vessels were faster, more maneuverable, and better defended. Nonetheless, the IJN submarine arm did have a number of notable successes against US Navy warships during the first year of the Pacific War, at a time when American production of new warships had not caught up. During this time, US Navy submarines achieved few major Japanese warship kills, being led by timid and unproductive submarine skippers, as well as being equipped with unreliable torpedoes that either ran too deep or had faulty triggers.

However, as fuel oil diminished and air superiority was lost, Japanese submarines were no longer able to continue with such successes. Once the United States was able to increase its production of destroyers and destroyer escorts, as well as bringing over highly effective anti-submarine techniques learned during the Battle of the Atlantic, they took a heavy toll upon Japanese submarines. Early models of IJN submarines were relatively less maneuverable under water, could not dive very deeply (compared to Kriegsmarine U-boats), and lacked radar. Later in the war, Japanese submarines that were fitted with radar were in some instances sunk due to the ability of American radar sets to detect their emissions. For example, USS Batfish sank three such IJN submarines near Japan in just four days).

During the last two years of the War in the Pacific, many IJN submarines were also pressed into service delivering supplies to isolated island garrisons, ones that had been deliberately bypassed by the Americans and the Australians island-hopping campaign. These Japanese-held island bases could not be reached by surface transports because of blockades by Allied warplanes and naval vessels, however Japanese submarines in this role were generally inefficient as they could only transport a fraction of the goods that could be carried by surface ships.

After the end of the conflict, several of Japan's most innovative and advanced submarines were sent to Hawaii for inspection in "Operation Road's End" (I-400, I-401, I-201, and I-203) before being scuttled by the U.S. Navy in 1946 when the Soviet Union demanded access to the IJN submarines.

=== Successes against Allied warships ===
Twice in the first year of the war, Japanese submarines torpedoed the aircraft carrier USS Saratoga, and, while not sinking her, put her in the repair yard at a time when the US Navy could ill afford to do without her. Saratoga was torpedoed by submarine I-6 on January 11, 1942, putting her out of action and unavailable to participate in the desperate carrier battles and raids of the next five months, and then hit again three months after her return on September 1, 1942, by I-26, which put her out of action for another eleven weeks in the middle of the intensely engaged land-air-sea battles of the Guadalcanal Campaign.

During the Battle of Midway, I-168 administered the final coup de grace that sank the crippled fleet carrier USS Yorktown, as well as sinking the destroyer USS Hammann. A few months later, on September 15, 1942, with a single salvo of torpedoes, Japanese submarine I-19 sank the fleet carrier USS Wasp and damaged both the battleship USS North Carolina and the destroyer USS O'Brien. On November 13, 1942, the submarine I-26 torpedoed and sank the anti-aircraft cruiser USS Juneau, and a year later on November 23, 1943, the submarine I-175 torpedoed and sank the escort carrier USS Liscome Bay, both with heavy loss of life. The I-176 had the distinction of both severely damaging the heavy cruiser USS Chester, knocking her out of the war for a year, on October 20, 1942, and of also sinking USS Corvina (the only American submarine to be sunk by a Japanese submarine in the entire war) on November 16, 1943.

The Japanese submarine arm had few notable successes against Allied warships during the final two years of the war. One victory was the I-41 knocking the anti-aircraft cruiser USS Reno out for the rest of the war with a torpedo hit on November 3, 1944 (this was the first time in almost two years that a Japanese submarine had successfully attacked an Allied ship operating with a fast carrier task force). On July 30, 1945, just two weeks before the Japanese surrender, I-58 torpedoed and sank the heavy cruiser USS Indianapolis, with heavy loss of life, at a time when few in the United States Navy expected continued Japanese submarine attacks.

=== Submarine aircraft carriers ===
The Japanese applied the concept of the "submarine aircraft carrier" extensively, starting with the J3 type of 1937–38. Altogether 41 submarines were built with the capability to carry seaplanes. Most IJN submarine aircraft carriers could carry only one aircraft, but I-14 had hangar space for two, and the giant I-400 class, three.

=== Attacks upon continental USA ===
A plane launched from one of the innovative aircraft-carrying submarines, I-25, conducted what remains the only ever aerial bombing attack on the continental United States, when Warrant Flying Officer Nobuo Fujita piloting a Yokosuka E14Y scouting plane dropped four 168-pound bombs in an attempt to start forest fires outside the town of Brookings, Oregon, on September 9, 1942. Earlier in the year, in February 1942, the submarine I-17 fired a number of shells from her deck gun at the Elwood Oil Fields near Santa Barbara, California. None of the shells caused any serious damage.

=== Yanagi missions ===
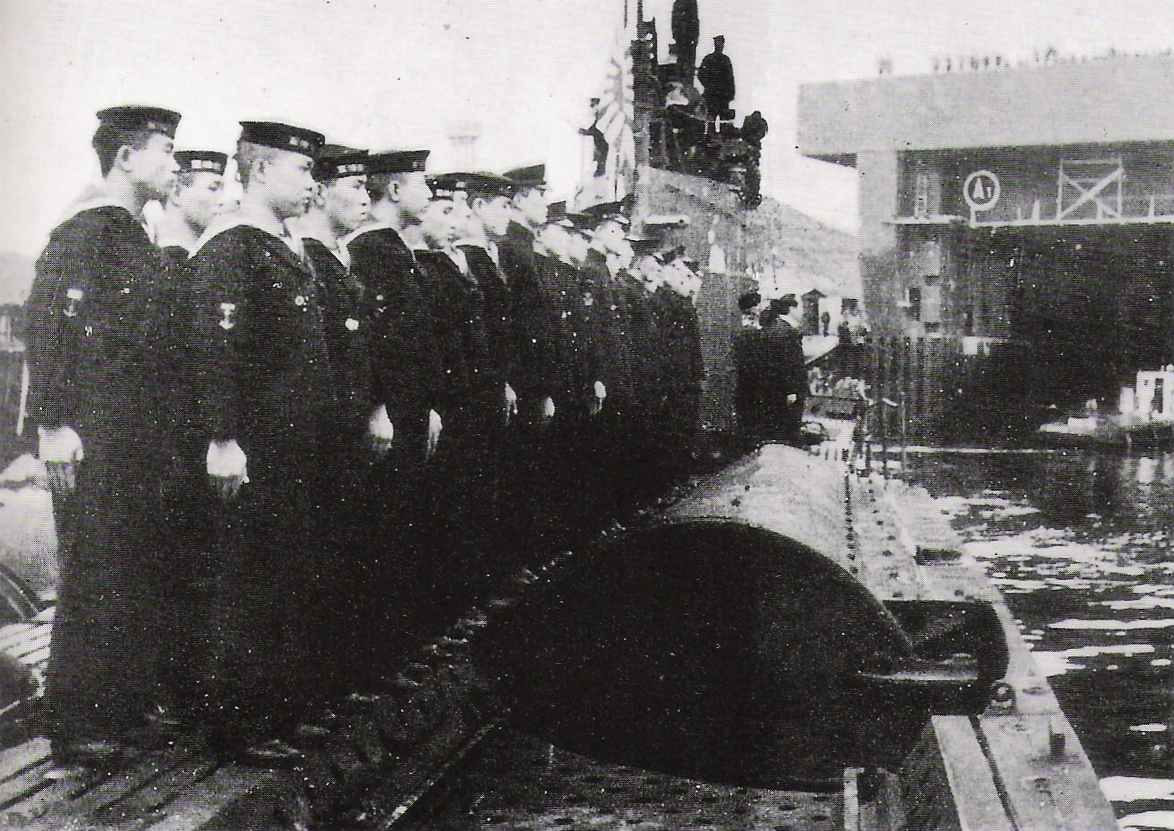
I-8 arriving in Brest, France, in 1943.

Yanagi missions were enabled under the Axis Powers' Tripartite Pact to provide for an exchange of key personnel, technology, strategic materials, and manufactured goods between Germany, Italy, and Japan. Initially, cargo ships made the exchanges, but when this was no longer possible, submarines were used under Wenneker's direction. The submarines had to pass through the Atlantic, Indian, and Pacific Oceans, and many of the submarines were lost during the journey with their entire cargo and passengers.

Only six submarines attempted this trans-oceanic voyage during World War II: I-30 (mid-June to August 1942), I-8 (June 1943), I-34 (October 1943), I-29 (November 1943), and German submarines U-511 (August 1943) and U-864 (December 1944). Of these, I-30 was partially successful but was later sunk by a mine, I-8 completed her mission, I-34 was sunk by British submarine Taurus, and I-29 by the United States submarine, Sawfish (assisted by Ultra intelligence). I-52 made the final attempt.

Wenneker believed that Japanese submarines were inferior to German U-boats, being too large to be maneuverable and having worse radar capabilities. On Wenneker's initiative, Hitler eventually agreed to send two Kriegsmarine U-boats to Japan for the Japanese to be able to study their technology. The first, U-511, arrived in Japan in the summer of 1943 and was examined before being used as a training ship. The Japanese believed the German U-boat was too complicated for them to build more in their shipyards. The second German submarine, U-1224, was used by a Japanese crew that had traveled to Germany and spent several months being trained by the Kriegsmarine there on German submarine operations and tactics, but they were lost when the submarine was destroyed on its way to Japan in the spring of 1944 by a U.S. anti-submarine hunter-killer group.

== Notable operations ==
=== Midget submarines ===
Japanese midget submarines were involved in many actions during the Pacific war including the attacks on Pearl Harbor and Sydney Harbour.

=== Attacks on North America ===
Japanese submarines shelled and carried out reconnaissance on the west coast of the continental United States. Later in the war, there were plans for a four boat, 10-airplane attack on the Panama Canal using the I-400 class submarine, but these plans had to be abandoned.

=== USS Indianapolis ===
The I-58 sank the heavy cruiser USS Indianapolis shortly after it delivered parts for the atomic bomb Little Boy to the island of Tinian. The loss of the Indianapolis was not noticed for four days, which resulted in the deaths of hundreds of American sailors at sea, and constituted the greatest loss of life at sea in a single incident in the history of the United States Navy.

=== Yanagi Missions ===
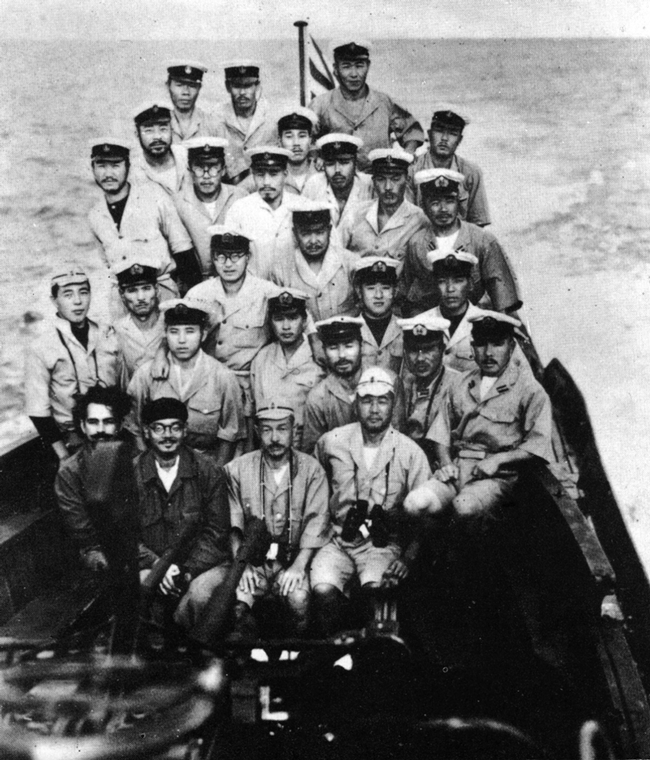
The crew of I-29 with that of the German U-180 off the coast of Madagascar, 1943

After 1942, submarines became the only remaining supply link between Nazi Germany and Japan, and trade was focused on strategic materials, technical plans and blueprints. Only a small number of submarines managed to reach either destination and only four Japanese submarines succeeded in these Yanagi attempts: I-30 (April 1942), I-8 (June 1943), I-34 (October 1943) and I-29 (December 1943).

Before I-29 embarked on her voyage to German-occupied France in December 1943, she had previously rendezvoused with the German submarine U-180 during an earlier mission to the Indian Ocean. During this meeting on 28 April 1943, Indian nationalist Subhas Chandra Bose was transferred to I-29 to become the only civilian exchanged between two submarines of two different navies in World War II.

== See also ==
- Allied submarines in the Pacific War
- Imperial Japanese Navy submarines
