= Japanese submarine offensive in the Mozambique Channel =

1942 naval campaign

- Part of World War II
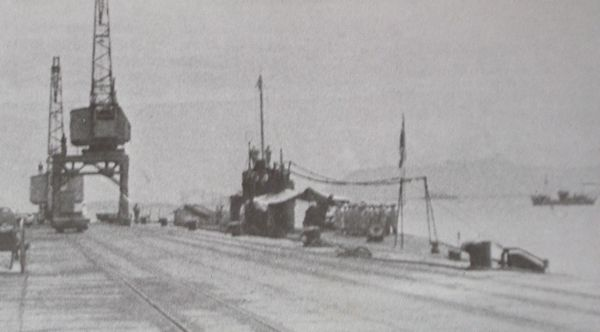
- Japanese submarine I-10 in 1942
Date	May – July 1942
Location	Mozambique Channel, Indian Ocean
Result	Japanese victory

Belligerents
(Empire of Japan) Japan	United Kingdom; South Africa; Panama; United States; Yugoslavia; Norway; Greece; Netherlands; Sweden

Commanders and leaders
Noboru Ishizaki	Victor Danckwerts

Units involved
8th Submarine Squadron	Eastern Fleet; South African Air Force

Strength
5 submarines; 2 armed merchant cruisers	Eastern Fleet: 3 corvettes; 5 destroyers

Casualties and losses
2 midget submarines lost	1 battleship damaged; 1 tanker sunk; 23 merchant ships sunk

The Japanese submarine offensive in the Mozambique Channel was a naval campaign conducted by the Imperial Japanese Navy against Allied shipping between May and July 1942 in the Indian Ocean.

== Operational losses ==
All naval casualties resulting from the campaign:

=== Naval vessels ===
Date	Ship	Type	Country	Status	Attacked by
20 May 1942	Genota	Tanker	Netherlands	Captured	Aikoku Maru & Hōkoku Maru
30 May 1942	HMS Ramillies	Battleship	United Kingdom	Damaged	I-20
30 May 1942	British Loyalty	Tanker	United Kingdom	Sunk	I-20

=== Merchant ships sunk ===
Date	Ship	Country	Tonnage	Attacked by	Lat/Long
5 June 1942	Elysia	United Kingdom	6,757	Aikoku Maru	27⁰ 33'S; 37⁰ 05'E
5 June 1942	Atlantic Gulf	Panama	2,639	I-10	21⁰ 03'S; 37⁰ 36'E
5 June 1942	Melvin H. Baker	United States	4,998	I-10	21⁰ 44'S; 36⁰ 38'E
5 June 1942	Johnstown	Panama	5,086	I-20	13⁰ 12'S; 42⁰ 06'E
6 June 1942	Susak	Yugoslavia	3,889	I-16	15⁰ 42'S; 40⁰ 58'E
6 June 1942	Wilford	Norway	2,158	I-18	20⁰ 20'S; 36⁰ 47'E
8 June 1942	Christos Markettos	Greece	5,209	I-20	05⁰ 05'S; 40⁰ 53'E
8 June 1942	Agios Georgios IV	Greece	4,847	I-16	16⁰ 12'S; 41⁰ 00'E
8 June 1942	King Lud	United Kingdom	5,224	I-10	20⁰ S; 40⁰ E
11 June 1942	Mahronda	United Kingdom	7,926	I-20	14⁰ 37'S; 40⁰ 58'E
11 June 1942	Hellenic Trader	Panama	2,052	I-20	14⁰ 40'S; 40⁰ 53'E
12 June 1942	Clifton Hall	United Kingdom	5,063	I-20	16⁰ 25'S; 40⁰ 10'E
12 June 1942	Supetar	Yugoslavia	3,748	I-16	21⁰ 49'S; 35⁰ 50'E
28 June 1942	Queen Victoria	United Kingdom	4,937	I-10	21⁰ 15'S; 40⁰ 30'E

== Bibliography ==
- Kleynhans, Evert (December 2018). "3.2 The Japanese submarine offensive in the Mozambique Channel". The Axis and Allied Maritime Operations around Southern Africa, 1939-1945 (PhD thesis). Stellenbosch University. pp. 91–100.
