= Japanese submarine I-8 =

Imperial Japanese Navy Junsen III type submarine

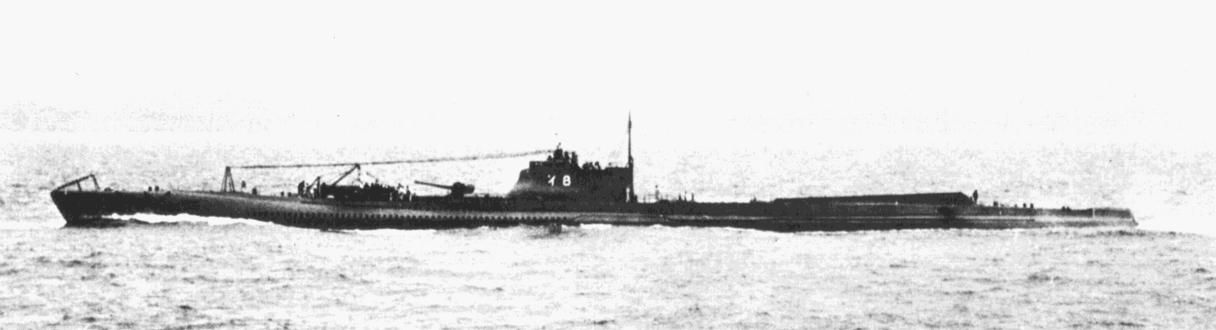
- I-8 entering Kagoshima Bay on the coast of Japan on 12 September 1939.

History

Empire of Japan
- Name: I-8
- Builder: Kawasaki, Kobe, Japan
- Laid down: 11 October 1934
- Launched: 20 July 1936
- Completed: 5 December 1938
- Fate: Sunk 31 March 1945

General characteristics
- Class & type: Junsen-class J3 Type submarine
- Displacement: 2,525 long tons (2,566 t) surfaced; 3,583 long tons (3,640 t) submerged
- Length: 358.5 ft 6 in (109.42 m)
- Beam: 29 ft 8 in (9.04 m)
- Draft: 17 ft 3 in (5.26 m)
- Propulsion: Diesel-electric; 2 diesel engines, 11,200 hp (8,400 kW) (surfaced); Electric motors, 2,800 hp (2,100 kW) (submerged)
- Speed: 23 knots (43 km/h; 26 mph) (surfaced); 8 knots (15 km/h; 9.2 mph) (submerged)
- Range: 14,000 nmi (26,000 km) at 16 knots (30 km/h; 18 mph)
- Test depth: 100 m (330 ft)
- Complement: 100 officers and men
- Armament: 1 × twin 14 cm/40 11th Year Type naval gun; 2 × Type 96 25 mm (0.98 in) AA guns; 6 × 533 mm (21.0 in) forward torpedo tubes; 21 torpedoes; Kaiten fittings (added 1944–1945)
- Aircraft carried: 1 × Yokosuka E14Y seaplane (removed 1944)
- Aviation facilities: 1 x aircraft catapult (removed 1944); 1 x hangar (removed 1944)

I-8 was an Imperial Japanese Navy Junsen III (or J3)-type submarine commissioned in 1938 that served during World War II. Designed as submarine aircraft carriers, I-8 and her sister ship I-7 were the largest Japanese submarines to be completed before the outbreak of the war in the Pacific in 1941. With embarked floatplanes, I-8 participated in operations related to the attack on Pearl Harbor, patrolled off the United States West Coast, and took part in the Guadalcanal campaign and the Okinawa campaign.

In 1943, I-8 completed a technology exchange mission with a voyage to German-occupied France and back to Japan, the only submarine to complete a round-trip voyage between Japan and Europe during World War II. Under a new commanding officer in 1944, her crew committed war crimes during anti-shipping operations in the Indian Ocean. She was sunk in 1945.

== Construction and commissioning ==
Built by Kawasaki at Kobe, Japan, with a design based on that of the Kaidai (KD)-type submarines, I-8 was laid down on 11 October 1934. She was launched on 20 July 1936 and was completed and commissioned on 5 December 1938.

== Service history ==
=== Pre-World War II ===
On the day of her commissioning, I-8 was attached to the Yokosuka Naval District. On 15 December 1938, she became the flagship of Submarine Squadron 2 in the 2nd Fleet, a component of the Combined Fleet. She became the flagship of Submarine Squadron 3 in the 2nd Fleet on 15 November 1939. On 11 October 1940, she was one of 98 Imperial Japanese Navy ships that gathered along with more than 500 aircraft on the Japanese coast at Yokohama Bay for an Imperial fleet review — the largest fleet review in Japanese history — in honor of the 2,600th anniversary of the enthronement of the Emperor Jimmu, Japan's legendary first emperor.

On 15 November 1940, Submarine Squadron 3 was reassigned to the 6th Fleet in the Combined Fleet. At some point, the submarine tender Taigei relieved I-8 as squadron flagship, because on 1 October 1941, Rear Admiral Shigeyoshi Miwa, the commander of Submarine Squadron 3, transferred his flag from Taigei to I-8, making her the squadron flagship again. She subsequently conducted combat training along with the other submarines of the squadron off Kyushu.

By 10 November 1941, I-8 had been assigned to the 6th Fleet's Advance Expeditionary Force. That day, the 6th Fleet's commander, Vice Admiral Mitsumi Shimizu, held a meeting with the commanding officers of the submarines of Submarine Squadron 3 aboard his flagship, the light cruiser Katori, which was anchored in Saeki Bay on the coast of Kyushu, and his chief of staff briefed them on plans for Operation Z, the upcoming surprise attack on Pearl Harbor in Hawaii. The attack would begin the Pacific campaign and bring Japan and the United States into World War II.

As Japanese military forces began to deploy for the opening Japanese offensive of the war, I-8, with an embarked Watanabe E9W1 (Allied reporting name "Slim") floatplane, departed Saeki Bay on 11 November 1941 bound for Kwajalein Atoll, which she reached on 20 November 1941. Assigned to support Operation Z, I-8 got underway from Kwajalein on 24 November 1941 and set course for the Hawaiian Islands. While she was en route, she received the message "Climb Mount Niitaka 1208" (Japanese: Niitakayama nobore 1208) from the Combined Fleet on 2 December 1941, indicating that war with the Allies would commence on 8 December 1941 Japan time, which was on 7 December 1941 on the other side of the International Date Line in Hawaii.

=== World War II ===
==== First war patrol: Pearl Harbor ====
By 7 December 1941, the day of the Pearl Harbor attack, I-8 was patrolling north of Oahu with orders to attack any ships that attempted to sortie from Pearl Harbor. She returned to Kwajalein on 24 December 1941.

==== Second war patrol ====
I-8 got underway from Kwajalein again on 12 January 1942 bound for a patrol area off the United States West Coast. Early on 3 February 1942, she arrived off San Francisco, California, and noted that the city did not appear to have instituted a blackout. Toward evening that day, she sighted a convoy of what she identified as seven transports and three destroyers passing her at high speed, but she was unable to attempt an attack. She had planned to use her floatplane for a reconnaissance flight over San Francisco Bay, but rough weather forced her to cancel those plans. She subsequently moved north along the U.S. West Coast as far as Seattle, Washington, but found no opportunities to attack Allied ships. She discontinued her patrol on 9 February 1942 and headed for Kure, Japan, where she arrived on 2 March 1942.

==== March–September 1942 ====
After arriving at Kure, I-8 began repairs and an overhaul. After completion of the work, she departed Yokosuka, Japan, on 15 April 1942 along with the rest of Submarine Squadron 3, bound for Kwajalein and serving as the squadron flagship with Rear Admiral Miwa embarked. During the squadron's voyage, it received orders on 18 April 1942 to search for a United States Navy task force reported to be operating 700 nautical miles (1,300 km; 810 mi) east of Tokyo, but it did not make contact with the task force. The same day, 16 United States Army Air Forces B-25 Mitchell bombers launched by the aircraft carrier USS Hornet — one of two aircraft carriers in the task force along with USS Enterprise — struck targets on Honshu in the Doolittle Raid.

The squadron resumed its voyage, but Rear Admiral Miwa became seriously ill. While the other submarines of the squadron continued on to Kwajalein, I-8 turned back for Yokosuka to seek medical treatment for him. After she arrived at Yokosuka, Rear Admiral Chimaki Kono came aboard I-8 and relieved Miwa as squadron commander, and I-8 put back to sea on 26 April 1942 and again set course for Kwajalein. She was off Roi-Namur at Kwajalein Atoll on 6 May 1942 when after 05:44 two Imperial Japanese Navy Mitsubishi G4M1 (Allied reporting name "Betty') bombers mistook her for an Allied submarine and attacked her, dropping eight 60-kilogram (132 lb) bombs and inflicting damage on I-8 that prevented her from submerging. After calling at Kwajalein from 7 to 8 May 1942, she returned to Japan, arriving at Kure on 16 May 1942 for repairs. Because of the incident the Imperial Japanese Navy subsequently painted double white bands on its submarines, usually on the afterdeck, as a recognition aid.

On the day of her arrival at Kure, I-8 was reassigned to Submarine Squadron 5. While I-8 was in Japan, Submarine Squadron 5 was disbanded on 14 July 1942, and I-8 was reassigned to serve as the flagship of the Southwest Area Fleet with the submarines of Submarine Division 30 — I-162, I-165, and I-166. I-8 collided with the auxiliary cruiser Bangkok Maru in Saeki Bay off the coast of Kyushu on 27 August 1942 and suffered minor damage.

==== Guadalcanal campaign ====
The Guadalcanal campaign began with United States Marine Corps landings on Guadalcanal in the southeastern Solomon Islands on 7 August 1942. Assigned directly to the 6th Fleet on 20 August 1942, I-8 departed Saeki, Japan, on 15 September 1942 to support Japanese forces in the campaign. She arrived at Truk Atoll along with the submarines of Submarine Squadron 3 — I-168, I-169, I-171, I-172, I-174, and I-175 — on 18 September 1942. She departed Truk later in September 1942 and conducted a war patrol in the southeastern Solomon Islands southeast of San Cristobal, which she concluded with her arrival at the Japanese anchorage in the Shortland Islands on 2 October 1942. She got back underway on 5 October for a war patrol in the vicinity of the Indispensable Reefs south of Rennell Island, returning to the Shortlands anchorage on 24 October 1942.

Later in October, I-8 put to sea again for another patrol, during which her Watanabe E9W1 (Allied reporting name "Slim") floatplane reconnoitered the harbors at Port Vila and Havannah on Efate in the New Hebrides on 2 November 1942. After returning to the Shortlands anchorage during November 1942, she loaded 21 tons of supplies for Japanese forces on Guadalcanal. She departed the Shortlands on 4 December 1942 bound for Guadalcanal and, after delivering the supplies, returned to the Shortlands on 8 December 1942.

During December 1942, I-8 moved to Truk, from which she got underway on 14 January 1943 for a war patrol off Canton Island in the Phoenix Islands and off the Samoan Islands and Fiji. During the patrol, she bombarded Canton Island twice with her 140-millimeter (5.5 in) deck guns, firing 41 rounds at the island on 23 January 1943 and another 45 rounds on 1 February 1943.

While I-8 was on patrol, the Guadalcanal campaign came to end with the evacuation of Japanese forces from the island in Operation Ke, completed on 8 February 1943. I-8 concluded her patrol with her arrival at Truk on 10 March 1943. She then got back underway for an overhaul at Kure, which she reached on 21 March 1943.

==== Yanagi mission ====
===== Voyage to France =====
The Tripartite Pact among the Axis powers provided for an exchange of strategic materials and manufactured goods between Germany, Italy, and Japan. At first, cargo ships made voyages between Japan and Europe to exchange materials, but when that became impractical, submarines began to carry them out. The Japanese component of this submarine effort was known as the Yanagi missions (柳作戦, Yanagi sakusen), or more formally the Submarine Missions to Germany (遣独潜水艦作戦, Kendoku sensuikan sakusen). The first submarine to attempt aYanagi mission was I-30, which made a trip from Japan to German-occupied France and back to Singapore between April and October 1942, but struck a British mine and sank before she could return to Japan.

While I-8 was in Japan, her direct assignment to the 6th Fleet ended on 1 April 1943 when she was assigned to Submarine Division 14 in Submarine Squadron 8 in the 6th Fleet. With her overhaul complete, I-8 was selected for the second Yanagi mission. Commanded by Captain Shinji Uchino, I-8 conducted refueling exercises in the Iyo-nada in the Seto Inland Sea with the submarine I-10 from 17 to 19 May 1943. Assigned directly to Submarine Squadron 8 on 25 May 1943, she departed Kure on 1 June 1943 accompanied by I-10 and the submarine tender Hie Maru. Her cargo included two Type 95 oxygen-propelled torpedoes, torpedo tubes, drawings of an automatic trim system, and a new Yokosuka E14Y (Allied reporting name "Glen") reconnaissance floatplane. A supplementary crew of 48 men — commanded by Lieutenant Commander Sadatoshi Norita and intended to man a German submarine, the Type IXC/40 U-boat U-1224, and bring her back to Japan for reverse engineering — was also packed into the submarine, and a Constructor Commander Nishihara also made the voyage so that he could study German torpedo boat engines. Norita's crew and Nishihara brought the number of men aboard I-8 for the voyage to 160, creating very cramped conditions aggravated by the amount of cargo on board. Most of Norita's men were accommodated in the forward torpedo room, and to make room for them, I-8 carried only the six torpedoes loaded in her torpedo tubes during the voyage.

The three vessels paused in Saeki Gulf, then got back underway on 2 June 1943 to head south. From 10 to 22 June, I-8 called at Singapore, where she took on board quinine, tin, and raw rubber. She arrived at Penang in Japanese-occupied British Malaya on 23 June 1943, With a cargo that also included tungsten and probably medicinal opium, she departed Penang on 27 June in company with I-10 and headed across the Indian Ocean, refueling from I-10 at 04°53′S 087°20′E on 1 July and again at 22°25′S 076°15′E on 6 July 1943 before detaching from I-10 and proceeding alone. On 21 July 1943, I-8 entered the Atlantic Ocean 300 nautical miles (560 km; 350 mi) south of the Cape of Good Hope on the southern tip of Africa. Over the next ten days she encountered fierce storms which damaged her upper deck and aircraft hangar and was rarely able to make more than 5 knots (9.3 km/h; 5.8 mph). During this time she received her first radio message from the German Kriegsmarine, which provided warning of Allied air patrols and radar facilities.

I-8 crossed the equator heading northward on 2 August 1943. On 20 August, she rendezvoused with the German submarine U-161 — under the command of Korvettenkapitän Albrecht Achilles — in the Atlantic Ocean south of the Azores, and an Oberleutnant zur See and two petty officers transferred from U-161 to I-8 to install a radar detector — either a FuMB 1 Metox 600A or a FuMB 9 Wanze, according to different sources — on her bridge, which made I-8 the first Japanese submarine with a radar detector. I-8′s crew presented U-161 with a four-gallon tank of coffee, and the two submarines parted company, with the three Germans remaining aboard I-8 to guide her into port in German-occupied France. U-161 was sunk with the loss of all 53 men on board on 27 September 1943, making them the only survivors of U-161′s final patrol.

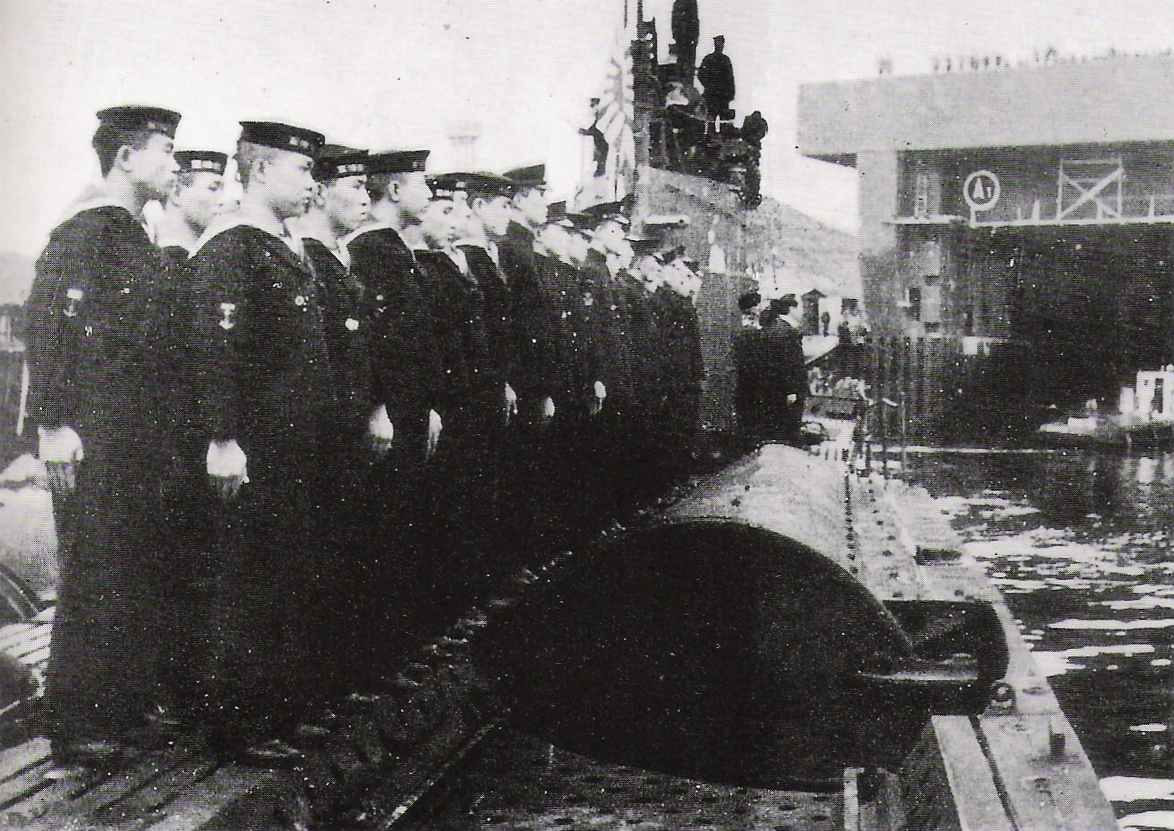
I-8 arriving at Brest, France

The Germans assigned I-8 the code name Flieder ("Lilac"). After she entered the Bay of Biscay on 29 August 1943, the Luftwaffe sent Junkers Ju 88 aircraft of Kampfgeschwader 40 to provide air cover. Several Kriegsmarine destroyers also escorted her as she approached Brest, France. After the German torpedo boats T22, T24, and T25 swept a safe channel through the defensive field of magnetic influence mines protecting the harbor, I-8 arrived at Brest safely on 31 August 1943, a German tug assisting her in docking in one of the submarine pens there as a German military band played.

===== In Europe =====
A German delegation led by the commander of the Kriegsmarine's Marineoberkommando der West ("Naval High Command of the West"), Admiral Theodor Krancke, warmly greeted I-8′s crew, which turned out on deck in their dress blue uniforms for the occasion, and presented them with German military decorations. Over the next month, the Germans held parties for the Japanese and organized visits to Paris and Berlin for them. The Germans also hosted the Japanese at a luxurious leisure facility at Chateau de Trévarez, overlooking Chateauneuf de Faou. German news agencies highlighted I-8′s visit, announcing that "now even Japanese submarines are operating in the Atlantic." While in port, I-8 was fitted with a radar.

For her return voyage, I-8 loaded a cargo that included German equipment, including machine guns, bomb sights for horizontal bombers and dive bombers, quad 20 mm anti-aircraft guns, anti-aircraft gunsights, a Daimler-Benz MB 501 20-cylinder diesel torpedo boat engine for German S-boats (known to the Allies as "E-boats"), marine chronometers, radars, sonar equipment, electric torpedoes, and precious metals, as well as penicillin. As passengers she embarked Rear Admiral Tadao Yokoi, the Japanese naval attaché to Berlin since 1940; Captain Sukeyoshi Hosoya, the Japanese naval attaché to France since December 1939; three German naval officers; four German radar and hydrophone technicians; and four German civilians.

===== Return to Japan =====
I-8 departed Brest on 5 October 1943 with a strong escort of Kriegsmarine vessels. After crossing the equator southbound, she sent the second position report of her voyage to the Kriegsmarine. Allied signals intelligence detected her transmission and used high-frequency direction finding to plot her position. The next day, an Allied antisubmarine aircraft attacked her, but she escaped by crash-diving.

I-8 encountered another storm while passing through the "Roaring Forties" which delayed her and damaged her bridge. By November 1943 she had reached the Indian Ocean, where she affixed the hinomaru national identification marking to her conning tower just as a Japanese plane buzzed her, possibly avoiding a mistaken attack by the aircraft. Critically low on fuel, she attempted to contact the Japanese base at Penang and other Japanese submarines for assistance, but without success. She nonetheless arrived safely at Penang on 2 December 1943. Departing Penang on 4 December 1943, she reached Singapore on 5 December, and Kure on 21 December 1943 after a round-trip voyage of 30,000 nautical miles (56,000 km; 35,000 mi). She subsequently moved to the Tamano Shipyard in Okayama Prefecture for a refit.

One of only seven submarines, and one of only five Japanese submarines, to attempt a voyage between Japan and Europe during World War II, I-8 gained the distinction of becoming the only submarine to complete a round trip between Japan and Europe during the war. In addition to I-30, sunk in the only Yanagi mission prior to I-8′s voyage, the three submarines which attempted Yanagi missions after I-8 — I-34, sunk by the Royal Navy submarine HMS Taurus on 13 November 1943; I-52, sunk by U.S. Navy aircraft on 24 June 1944; and I-29, sunk by the U.S. Navy submarine USS Sawfish on 26 July 1944 — all were lost during their voyages. Of the two German submarines that attempted Europe-to-Japan trips analogous to the Japanese Yanagi missions, U-511 made only a one-way trip, being sold to the Imperial Japanese Navy after her arrival in Japan in September 1943, and U-180 was sunk on only the third day of her outbound voyage in August 1944.

==== War crimes under Ariizumi ====
While I-8 was in Japan, she received a new crew, and Commander Tatsunosuke Ariizumi became her new commanding officer on 15 January 1944. I-8 subsequently gained infamy for war crimes during the war patrols she conducted under his command because of his and his crew's treatment of Allied prisoners-of-war.

===== Ariizumi's first war patrol: SS Tjisalak =====
I-8 departed Kure on 21 February 1944 and proceeded to Penang, which she reached on 10 March 1944. She got underway from Penang on either 15 or 19 March 1944 (sources disagree) for a war patrol in the Indian Ocean off the Maldive Islands.

On 26 March 1944, I-8 attacked the Dutch 5,787-gross register ton armed passenger-cargo ship SS Tjisalak, which had departed Melbourne, Australia, on 7 March 1944 bound for Colombo, Ceylon, with a cargo of 6,640 tons of bagged flour and with 101 men and one woman — 27 passengers, 10 gunners, and a crew of 65 — aboard according to one source, although sources also claim 97, 101, or 103 people were aboard. Tjisalak′s crew sighted the incoming torpedoes at 05:45, and she had just begun an evasive turn when two torpedoes hit her, stopping her engine, puncturing her fuel tanks, knocking out her electrical lighting, blowing open the hatch of her No. 3 hold and wrecking the winches and derricks around it, knocking down her main and emergency aerials, and jamming her rudder hard to port, forcing her to steam in circles. Her crew launched three lifeboats, and the gunner manning one of her Oerlikon 20-millimeter automatic cannon opened fire on the twin periscopes of I-8, which was surfacing 1,000 yards (910 m) off Tjisalak′s port quarter, marking I-8′s position for Tjisalak′s 4-inch (102 mm) gun, then ceased fire and jumped overboard. The 4-inch (102 mm) gun opened fire on I-8 at 05:48, firing three rounds which landed close aboard I-8, prompting I-8 to submerge again. When I-8 again began to surface, the gun fired four more rounds at her and forced her to submerge again before Tjisalak, still underway and circling to port, turned so far that the gun would no longer bear on I-8. The gun ceased fire at 06:00 and its crew abandoned ship just before Tsijalak rolled onto her beam ends and sank by the stern 500 nautical miles (930 km; 580 mi) south of Colombo at 02°30′S 078°40′E.

Three crewmen died in the sinking, but the survivors gathered in the three lifeboats, two of which were damaged and leaking. I-8 surfaced again within 100 yards (91 m) of two of the boats. An I-8 crewmen began calling for Tjisalak′s captain to identify himself and crewmen gestured for the two closest lifeboats to come alongside. After they did, Tjisalak′s captain identified himself, and he, three other of the sunken ship′s officers, and three of her passengers — including the lone woman aboard, an American Red Cross nurse — were taken below. I-8′s crew then threatened the third lifeboat with her 25-millimeter antiaircraft guns, forcing it to come alongside as well. I-8′s crew forced all of the survivors other than the seven they had taken below to squat on deck, threatened them with submachine guns, rifles, and swords, and searched them roughly, confiscating anything of monetary value. Tied together in twos, the European and Chinese crew members were taken two-by-two aft of I-8′s conning tower, where they were slashed with swords and beaten with monkey wrenches and sledgehammers before the Japanese shot them and kicked them overboard. in at least some cases, one of the men was forced to watch the shooting of the other man brought aft with him before he, too, was shot. Those who jumped overboard were shot in the water, and at least three of I-8′s crew sat comfortably in chairs on deck and laughed while firing rifles at men struggling in the sea. I-8′s crew then beheaded Tsijalak′s Indian sailors one by one while a cameraman filmed the killings. Brought onto I-8′s bridge during the massacre, Tsijalak′s captain underwent a harsh interrogation there and then was killed with a sword. The other six people taken below decks before the massacre also did not survive, and postwar testimony revealed that the American nurse was taken on deck and shot to death on the evening of 26 March. Only five or six men (sources disagree) survived the massacre; they found a life raft or lifeboat (sources disagree) and the American Liberty ship SS James O. Wilder later rescued them.

On 30 March 1944, I-8′s Watanabe E9W1 (Allied reporting name "Slim") floatplane sighted the British 6,589-gross register ton armed merchant ship SS City of Adelaide in the Indian Ocean southeast of Diego Garcia in the Chagos Archipelago during a reconnaissance flight. The plane vectored I-8 to intercept City of Adelaide — which was steaming independently in ballast from Karachi in British India to Fremantle, Australia — then returned to I-8. After dark, I-8 fired one torpedo at City of Adelaide which struck her amidships. She took on a heavy list and, after transmitting a distress signal, her crew and gunners abandoned ship. I-8 then surfaced and sank City of Adelaide with gunfire at 12°01′S 080°27′E.

At 06:07 on 11 April 1944, a Japanese submarine — apparently I-8 — fired four torpedoes about four minutes apart at the American armed T2 tanker SS Yamhill in the Indian Ocean at 03°31′N 067°07′E. Two of the torpedoes passed along each side of Yamhill. Yamhill, which was on a voyage from Bahrain to Fremantle with a cargo of oil intended for use by U.S. Navy submarines, reported that she was under submarine attack and requested air cover. The submarine surfaced about 11,000 yards (10,100 m) from Yamhill and a 12-hour chase ensued in which the vessels exchanged fire, Yamhill′s 5-inch (127 mm) gun outranging the submarine's 140-millimeter (5.5 in) gun by about 175 yards (160 m). At around sundown, after the submarine had fired about 20 rounds and Yamhill had fired 38, a Royal Air Force Catalina flying boat arrived and forced the submarine to submerge, allowing Yamhill to escape in the growing darkness.

On 16 April 1944, I-8 sank a sailing vessel with gunfire off Addu Atoll in the Maldives. She concluded her patrol on 5 May 1944 with her return to Penang.

===== Ariizumi's second war patrol: SS Jean Nicolet =====
I-8 began her next war patrol on 10 June 1944, assigned a patrol area in the Indian Ocean off Madagascar. While en route, she torpedoed the British 6,942-gross register ton armed passenger-cargo ship Nellore — which was on a voyage from Bombay in British India to Sydney, Australia, carrying 174 passengers including British troops and 2,720 tons of general cargo including government stores — in the Indian Ocean southwest of Diego Garcia at 07°51′S 075°20′E at 23:45 on 29 June 1944. Two torpedoes struck Nellore, which caught fire and went dead in the water, and her survivors abandoned ship in nine lifeboats. I-8 surfaced and brought aboard 11 of the survivors — a gunner and 10 passengers, — and then sank the blazing Nellore with gunfire at around 02:45 on 30 June 1944. A total of 79 people from Nellore — 35 crew members, five gunners, and 39 passengers — lost their lives before the Royal Navy frigate HMS Lossie (K303) and a Royal Air Force seaplane rescued her remaining survivors. Several of Nellore′s survivors mistakenly claimed that she had been sunk in an attack by as many as three German submarines.

On 2 July 1944, I-8 was involved in another atrocity when she attacked the American 7,176-gross register ton armed Liberty ship SS Jean Nicolet. Jean Nicolet had departed San Pedro, California, on 12 May 1944 bound for Calcutta, India via Fremantle, Australia, and Colombo, Ceylon, with 69 crew and United States Navy Armed Guard personnel and 30 United States Army passengers aboard — although one source claims that a toal of 100, rather than 99, men were on board — and carrying a U.S. Army cargo of heavy machinery, steel plates, and landing craft in her holds and mooring pontoons and unassembled landing barges on her deck. She had been underway for the second leg of the voyage on 21 June 1944 after an overnight stop at Fremantle. Advised on 27 June 1944 to alter course to the west to avoid the area where I-8 had sunk Nellore 500 nautical miles (930 km; 580 mi) to the north that day, Jean Nicolet′s′ crew sighted what her captain thought was the smoke of an Allied Victory ship on her port quarter on the morning of 2 July 1944 and watched it overtake Jean Nicolet during the day, reaching a point off her starboard bow at sunset. The "smoke' in fact was I-8′s diesel exhaust as she raced to get ahead of Jean Nicolet and achieve a position for an attack.

At 19:00 on 2 July, Jean Nicolet was in the Indian Ocean 270 nautical miles (500 km; 310 mi) north-northeast of Diego Garcia and south of Ceylon about 700 nautical miles (1,300 km; 810 mi) off the Maldives. At 19:07, two torpedoes from I-8 struck her in her starboard side, one between her forecastle and bridge and one in her No. 4 hold. Shortly after the torpedoes hit, Jean Nicolet transmitted a distress signal and all on board abandoned ship in her four lifeboats and two life rafts. I-8 surfaced and opened 140-millimeter (5.5 in) gunfire on Jean Nicolet.

I-8 then began searching for Jean Nicolet′s survivors with a searchlight while a member of her crew called out for Jean Nicolet′s captain to identify himself. She approached one of the lifeboats and under threat of being shot forced everyone aboard it onto I-8′s deck, where a member of I-8′s crew almost immediately killed Jean Nicolet′s cabin boy with a single pistol shot to the head and kicked his body overboard. I-8′s crew then riddled the empty lifeboat with automatic weapons fire, confiscated the survivors′ lifejackets, shoes, and anything of value they had, then bound them and forced them to sit on I-8′s deck. I-8′s crew then approached a raft with 10 men aboard and ordered its occupants to come aboard, firing automatic weapons at five men who slipped away in the darkness but bringing the other five onto I-8′s deck. I-8′s crew repeated the process with the other raft and boats, bringing all the survivors aboard except for the five who had escaped from the first raft. After the Japanese searched the survivors, took their lifejackets, bound them, questioned them, and forced them all to sit on I-8′s forward deck, I-8 got underway and circled the area while her crew destroyed all the lifeboats and life rafts with automatic weapons fire. Her crew then forced Jean Nicolet′s survivors to watch while the Japanese again opened 140-millimeter (5.5 in) gunfire on their ship, making no effort to save two bound survivors who were swept overboard by I-8′s bow wave and drowned.

Around midnight, a Japanese officer armed with a sword approached the survivors and demanded that Jean Nicolet′s captain identify himself on pain of death. After he did, he and Jean Nicolet′s radio officer and a third man were led aft of I-8′s conning tower, and the other survivors never saw them again. One by one over the next several hours, the rest of the survivors then also were led aft of the conning tower, forced to run a gauntlet of clubs, pipes, bayonets, knives, and swords, and then shoved overboard to drown.

With 30 bound survivors still on deck and awaiting their turn to run the gauntlet, I-8 detected an incoming aircraft on radar and abruptly crash-dived, plunging them into the ocean to drown as the submarine submerged beneath them. A Royal Canadian Air Force Canso flying boat soon passed low over the area. Some of the survivors managed to untie themselves and others, and some of them began to swim toward the burning Jean Nicolet, which was about 2 nautical miles (3.7 km; 2.3 mi) away, but before they could reach her, the ship sank on 3 July 1944 about 2 1/2 hours after sunrise at 03°28′S 074°30′E. At around 12:00 on 4 July 1944, a Catalina flying boat sighted the men in the water, and the Royal Navy armed trawler HMS Hoxa rescued the remaining survivors on the afternoon of 4 July, about 30 or 34 hours (according to different sources) after I-8 submerged.

Sources disagree on the number of deaths and survivors. One source identifies the three men I-8′s crew took aft before the massacre began as Jean Nicolet′s captain, chief officer, and radio officer, another identifies them as the captain, radio officer, and a civilian passenger and says that they were taken below, and yet another source claims that I-8′s crew took five men below. Sources differ on the number of survivors, but one asserts that Hoxa rescued 23 men and that 77 died in the sinking and massacre, implying that all men taken below before the massacre also were murdered, but one source claims that only four men survived. One source asserts that I-8′s crew took five prisoners-of-war from Jean Nicolet to Japan, where one of them, Francis J. O'Gara, was found alive in a prisoner-of-war camp after World War II. That source claims that a new Liberty ship, SS Francis J. O'Gara, had been named after him by that time in the belief that he had been killed in the Jean Nicolet incident, making O'Gara the only living person to have a Liberty ship named after him.

I-8 concluded her patrol with her arrival at Penang on either 8 or 14 August 1944, according to different sources.

===== August–November 1944 =====
When the German submarine U-862 arrived at Penang on 9 September 1944, Ariizumi joined the commander — Rear Admiral Jisaku Ouzumi — and staff of Submarine Squadron 8 in welcoming the German crew. On 11 September 1944, U-862 hosted a visit by Ouzumi, Arriizumi, and I-8′s officers, and later that day U-862′s commanding officer, Korvettenkapitän Heinrich Timm, and his officers visited I-8.

I-8 departed Penang later in September 1944 and arrived on 9 October 1944 at Yokosuka, where she underwent a refit, repairs, and modifications, including the removal of her hangar and aircraft catapult and their replacement with fittings for kaiten manned suicide attack torpedoes. On 5 November 1944, Ariizumi relinquished command for a new assignment.

===== Postwar prosecution of crew =====
The high or total loss of life aboard merchant ships I-8 sank while Ariizumi was in command suggested to Allied investigators that Ariizumi and his men may have committed additional war crimes beyond those documented in the Tjisalak and Jean Nicolet incidents. Ariizumi, who had encouraged and participated in the murders, had reached the rank of captain and was the commander of Submarine Division 1 when he committed suicide aboard his flagship, the submarine I-401, while she was in the Philippine Sea on 30 August 1945 and making her way to Japan to surrender to the Allies in the immediate aftermath of the cessation of hostilities. Few of I-8′s crew during his time in command survived the war, but Allied investigators located three of them after the war and prosecuted them. One, found in the United States, was granted immunity in return for testifying against his former comrades and was then allowed to return to the United States. The others were convicted and served prison terms, which the Japanese government commuted in 1955.

==== Okinawa campaign ====
Despite her new kaiten fittings, I-8 had no kaiten on board when she departed Saeki with the submarines Ro-41, Ro-49, and Ro-56 on 18 March 1945 to operate south of Okinawa. She returned to Saeki on 19 March for repairs, but again got underway on 20 March 1945 to begin her patrol. The preliminaries of the Okinawa campaign began on 26 March 1945, when American forces began landing on the Kerama Islands. At 18:05 on 28 March 1945, she transmitted a message reporting that she had sighted two Allied transports and four destroyers 110 nautical miles (200 km; 130 mi) from Naha, bearing 150 degrees. The Japanese never heard from her again.

==== Loss ====
On 31 March 1945, the U.S. Navy destroyer USS Stockton detected a surface target on radar while screening a task group off the Kerama Islands. She approached the contact, which turned out to be I-8. I-8 crash-dived, after which Stockton made sonar contact on her. Over the next four hours, Stockton expended all of her depth charges in seven attacks against I-8.

I-8 surfaced just as the destroyer USS Morrison arrived on the scene to reinforce Stockton. I-8 immediately submerged again, but Morrison dropped a pattern of depth charges that forced I-8 to surface 900 yards (820 m) from Morrison. After a 30-minute exchange of gunfire, I-8 capsized and sank by the stern in the Philippine Sea at 25°29′N 128°35′E. One of Morrison′s boats picked up an unconscious petty officer who had been a member of I-8′s gun crew, and he was I-8′s only survivor.

On 10 April 1945, the Imperial Japanese Navy declared I-8 to be presumed lost in the Okinawa area. The Japanese struck her from the navy list on 10 August 1945.
