= Paul Wenneker =

German admiral and diplomat

Paul Wennecker
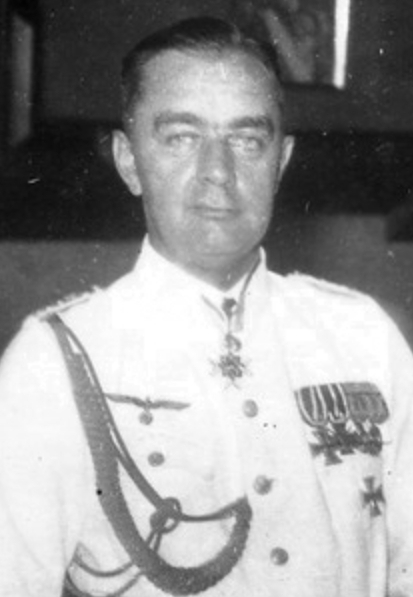
- Wenneker as naval attaché in Japan, 1940-45
- Born: February 27, 1890; Kiel, German Empire
- Died: October 17, 1979 (aged 89); Bergstedt, West Germany
- Military career
- Allegiance: German Empire; Weimar Germany; Nazi Germany
- Branch: Imperial German Navy; Reichsmarine; Kriegsmarine
- Service years: 1909–1945
- Rank: Admiral
- Commands: German torpedo boat T 109; German minesweeper M 2; German minesweeper M 30; German minesweeper M 132 German pocket battleship Deutschland

Paul Werner Wenneker (27 February 1890 – 17 October 1979) was a German admiral and diplomat who was most notable for serving as the German naval attaché in Japan from 1940 until the end of World War II in 1945. He served as the commanding admiral of German naval forces in Asia, and oversaw the activities of German U-boats and commerce raiders in the waters of the Pacific and Indian Oceans during the war. Wenneker also attempted to share German submarine technology and tactics with the Japanese to assist them in the Pacific War, though his efforts in that regard were mostly treated with indifference by the Japanese. Wenneker also became associated with Richard Sorge and his Soviet spy ring at the German embassy in Tokyo. He was detained by American occupation authorities after the war and then returned to Germany.

== Career ==
Born in Kiel to a naval family in 1890, Paul Wenneker joined the Kaiserliche Marine (Imperial Navy) in 1909 as a Seekadett and completed his training aboard the SMS Victoria Louise. During World War I he was serving on SMS Mainz, which sank during the Battle of Helgoland Bight, and he was one of the survivors taken prisoner. Wenneker returned to Germany at the end of the war and continued serving in the Reichsmarine.

He was promoted to Oberleutnant zur See (lieutenant junior grade) in 1919 while serving in the Baltic Sea aboard a minesweeper, and was promoted to Kapitänleutnant (lieutenant) in 1920. Wenneker served on and commanded several minesweepers and torpedo boats, before serving on cruisers in the second half of the 1920s. He became a Korvettenkapitän (lieutenant commander) in 1928 and a Fregattenkapitän (commander) in 1933.

From 1933 to 1937 he served as the German naval attaché in Japan, and was promoted to Kapitän zur See (captain) in early January 1935. During his first term as attaché, in January 1935 Wenneker was invited to tour the Japanese submarine I-2.

In between these terms, from 1937 to 1940, he was commanding officer of the German pocket battleship Deutschland. He was promoted to Konteradmiral (rear admiral) in 1939.

=== German naval attaché in Japan during WWII ===
After arriving in Japan for the second time as naval attaché, he was promoted to Vizeadmiral (vice admiral) to increase his status among the Japanese. He met with Richard Sorge, a diplomat at the German embassy in Tokyo and secretly a Soviet spy, who became well acquainted with Wenneker, providing the admiral with the details of army and navy politics in Japan. In addition to being German naval attaché, Wenneker was also in command of German naval forces in East Asia as the German Admiral East Asia (Deutscher Admiral Ostasien), and worked closely with the U-boat crews and other personnel in the Southern Region bases. He was also responsible for the network of German spies that existed in major cities across East Asia, who were part of the Abwehr.

During the war, there was a disconnect in strategic collaboration and communication between the German and Japanese military staffs. For instance, the communication between the Oberkommando des Heeres (Army Staff) and the Wehrmacht Operations Staff with the Imperial Japanese Army General Staff was infrequent. Alone of the branches of the German Wehrmacht, the Kriegsmarine developed a closer relationship with the Imperial Japanese Navy than either the Heer or the Luftwaffe did with their Japanese counterparts. A major reason for this was due to Wenneker's efforts to establish a partnership with Japanese naval officials in Tokyo. It was also possible because the Japanese sent a large naval delegation to Berlin as part of the commitments to the Tripartite Pact in 1940, led by Vice Admiral Naokuni Nomura. An effort was made by the Oberkommando der Marine (Naval Staff) to maintain contact with Vice Admiral Nomura, and with the Imperial Japanese Navy General Staff through Wenneker in Tokyo. Wenneker, who spoke fluent Japanese, built up contacts over his many years in Japan, and also because Japanese and German naval personnel were serving alongside each other in the "Southern Region," referring to southeast Asia and the Indian Ocean. At the naval bases in Japanese-occupied Malaysia and Indonesia where German and Japanese naval crews used the same facilities, there were sometimes tensions and strained relations, but these were resolved because of Wenneker and his influence with the Japanese Navy.

Wenneker urged that the submarines of the Imperial Japanese Navy be used to attack American supply ships traveling between the U.S. West Coast and Hawaii, as Germany's U-boats were doing in the Atlantic. The Japanese rejected his advice, believing that submarines should only be used to attack U.S. Navy warships. Wenneker believed that Japanese submarines were inferior to German designs, being too large to be maneuverable and having worse radar capabilities. On Wenneker's initiative, Hitler eventually agreed to send two Kriegsmarine U-boats to Japan for the Japanese to be able to study their technology. The first, U-511, arrived in Japan in the summer of 1943 and was examined before being used as a training ship. The Japanese believed the German U-boat was too complicated for them to build more in their shipyards. The second German submarine, U-1224, was used by a Japanese crew that had traveled to Germany and spent several months being trained by the Kriegsmarine there on German submarine operations and tactics, but they were lost when the submarine was destroyed on its way to Japan in the spring of 1944 by a U.S. anti-submarine hunter-killer group. Wenneker also managed the Yanagi missions, the exchange of technology and key personnel between Japan and Germany during the war using submarines. They had to pass through the Atlantic, Indian, and Pacific Oceans, and many of the submarines were lost during the journey with their entire cargo and passengers.

Germany complied with the Japanese naval delegation's requests for access to technology and information, with Hitler ordering all branches of the Wehrmacht to assist the Japanese, but this was not reciprocated on the Japanese side, which tried to keep information from Wenneker. It was only after considerable German pressure that in 1943, Wenneker was allowed to tour the Japanese "super battleship" Yamato, the largest battleship ever built, interested in temporarily trading the ship with the German battleship Tirpitz. Wenneker boarded the ship for an hour-long tour, exploring parts of the main deck and traversing through the pagoda mast, which he very much enjoyed as he was amazed by the floating goliath. He was told that Yamato was a 45,000-ton battleship armed with nine 40 cm (15.7 inch) naval guns. However, what he was not told was that Yamato actually displaced 72,808 tons, and was armed with nine 46 cm (18.11 inch) naval guns, the largest naval guns ever made, making Yamato the most powerful battleship ever made, far outclassing the Tirpitz in surface action capabilities, who herself was only armed with eight 38 cm (14.96 inch) naval guns.

After the war ended, Wenneker was detained by the American occupation authorities, and was interrogated by Rear Admiral Ralph A. Ofstie of the U.S. Navy, in which he spoke about Japanese–German naval relations and his opinion on the shortcomings of the Japanese submarine warfare campaign. The Americans noted that Wenneker had been an associate of the former German ambassador to Japan, Eugen Ott, who had been in contact with the Soviet spy Richard Sorge and had a falling out with the German government.

== Awards and decorations ==
- Iron Cross of 1914, 1st and 2nd class
- Spanish Cross in Gold with Swords
- War Merit Cross (1939), 1st and 2nd class with Swords
- German Cross in Silver (24 April 1944)
- Knight's Cross of the War Merit Cross with Swords (18 January 1945)
- Order of the Rising Sun, 1st Class (Japan)

== Literature ==
- Hildebrand, Hans; Henriot, Ernest (1990). Deutschlands Admirale, 1849–1945: die militärischen Werdegänge der See-, Ingenieur-, Sanitäts-, Waffen- und Verwaltungsoffiziere im Admiralsrang (in German). Vol. 3: P – Z. Osnabrück: Biblio-Verl. pp. 530–531. ISBN 3764814993.
- Geerken, Horst (2017). Hitler's Asian Adventure. Books on Demand. ISBN 978-3738630138.
- Hansen, Peter (2006). Execution for Duty. Pen and Sword Books. ISBN 1781596212.
- Rahn, Werner (1993). Japan and Germany, 1941–1943: No Common Objective, No Common Plans, No Basis of Trust. Vol. 46. Naval War College Review.
