= 8th Submarine Squadron (Imperial Japanese Navy) =

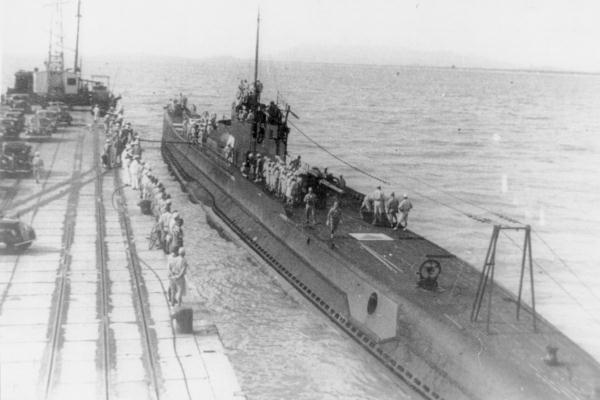
- Japanese submarine I-10 at Penang in 1942
- Active: 10 March 1942 – 20 February 1945
- Country: Empire of Japan
- Branch: Imperial Japanese Navy
- Type: Submarine squadron
- Size: Squadron
- Part of: 6th Fleet
- Garrison/HQ: Penang, Malaysia

The 8th Submarine Squadron of the Imperial Japanese Navy was based at Swettenham Pier, Penang, Malaya, until late 1944 during World War II. Its mission was to disrupt Allied supply lines in aid of Nazi Germany.

== History ==
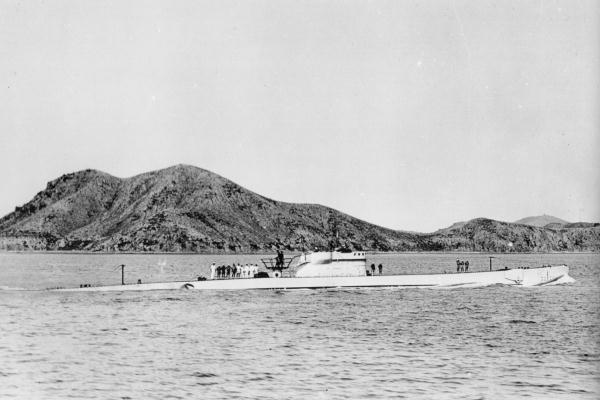
Italian submarine Conmandante Cappelini based at Penang

The squadron was raised at Kwajalein in the Marshall Islands on March 10, 1942, and was part of the 6th Fleet. On March 27 the German naval high command asked the Japanese to attack Allied convoys in the Indian Ocean. The Japanese agreed on April 8 and shortly afterward, the IJN's 8th Submarine Squadron, 1st Division, was withdrawn from Kwajalein in the Marshall Islands and sent to Penang, Malaya. At Penang the squadron shared the base at Swettenham Pier with Italian and German submarines.

The squadrons flying boats were based at the RAF Glugor seaplane base, which had originally been developed by the British. With its capture in 1941 the Japanese 101st Naval Construction Office took over use of the base as a repair and maintenance depot. On February 25, 1942, the 11th Submarine Flotilla was relocated to Penang and absorbed by the 8th Submarine Squadron when they arrived in April.

The squadron was withdrawn from Penang in late 1944 because of Allied mines and because the base was within range of both Kharagpur based B-24 Liberators and B29 bombers. A raid by mine-laying Liberators from No. 159 Squadron RAF on October 27, 1944, demonstrated this vulnerability when they managed to block the harbour entrance for a time. The last submarine to leave was the German U-843 on December 1.

By December 1944 the only surviving Japanese submarine of the squadron was I-165. She was sunk on June 27, 1945.

== Operations ==
=== 1942 ===
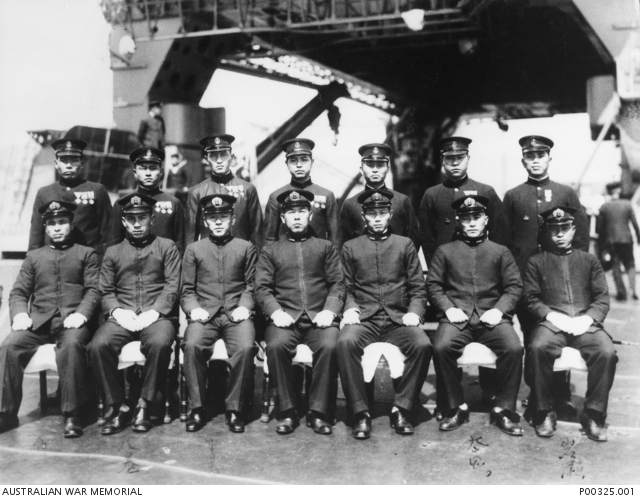
Crews of the midget submarines that participated in the attacks on Madagascar and Sydney.

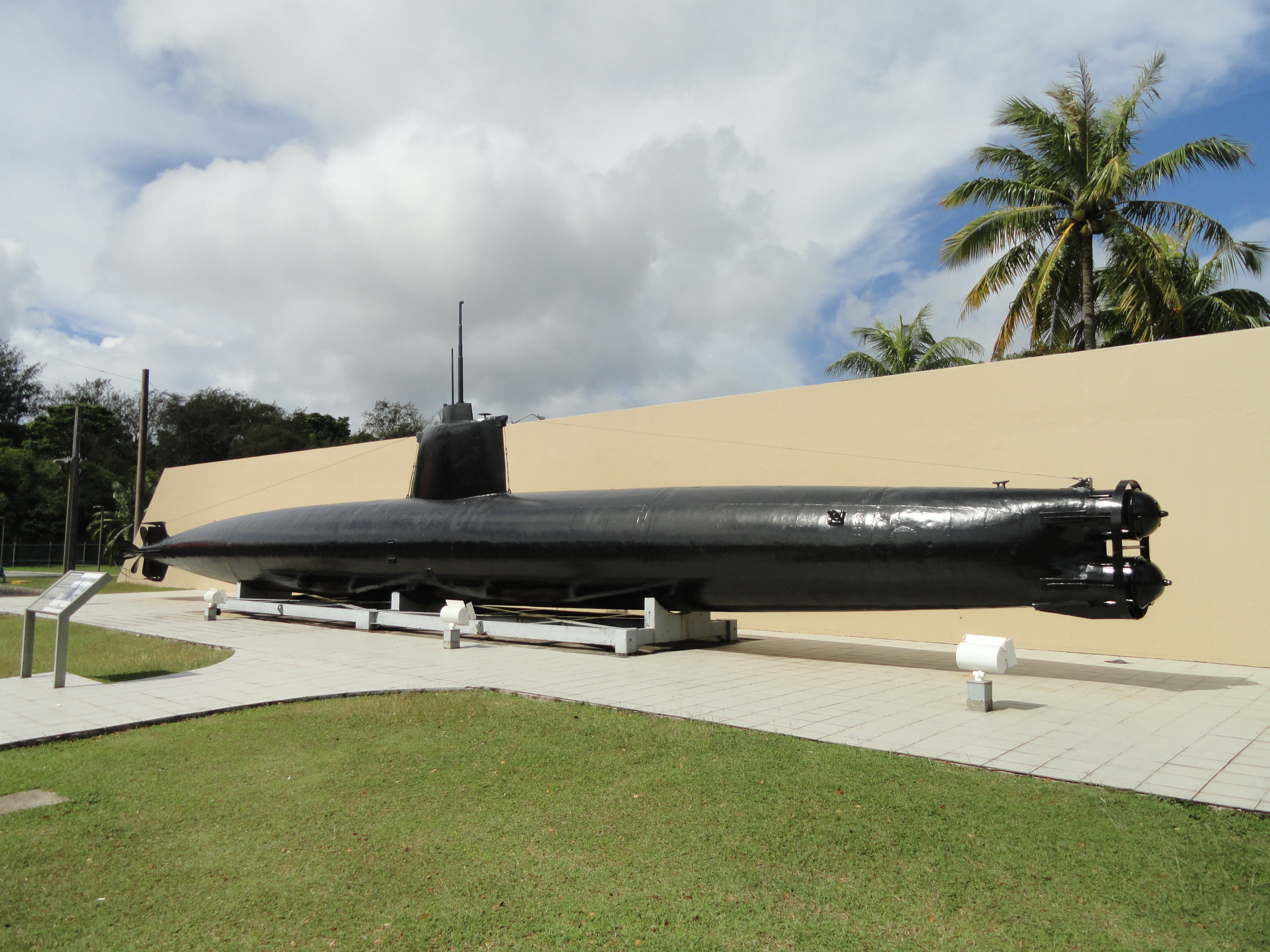
An Imperial Japanese Navy midget submarine.

The squadron's first operation was an Indian Ocean anti-shipping sweep by its 1st Division from Aden down the coast of East Africa to Madagascar. The auxiliary cruisers Aikoku Maru and Hōkoku Maru accompanied and supported the division. During the sweep the auxiliary cruisers captured the Dutch tanker Genora 480 nautical miles (890 km; 550 mi) south-southeast of Diego Suarez, Madagascar, on 9 May 1942.

The submarine I-10's floatplane overflew Diego Suarez on 29 May 1942 after the Allied landings on Madagascar in a search for targets for the midget submarines embarked aboard the submarines I-16, I-18, and I-20. Ishizaki subsequently ordered an attack on ships in the harbour by the midget submarines during the night of 30–31 May. I-18's midget submarine did not participate in the attack due to a malfunction, and I-16's midget submarine never returned. However, I-20′s midget submarine penetrated the harbour and damaged the Royal Navy battleship HMS Ramillies and sank the British tanker British Loyalty. After the midget submarine ran aground, its crew — Lieutenant Saburo Akieda and Petty Officer Masami Takemoto — abandoned it and reached shore. They died in a firefight with a Royal Marine patrol on Madagascar near Anjiabe on 2 June.

Through June 1942 the submarines focused their patrols on the Mozambique Channel, sinking 20 merchant ships totaling 120,000 gross register tons of shipping. I-30 proceeded around the Cape of Good Hope to Lorient in occupied France, arriving there on 5 August 1942 and becoming the first Japanese submarine to reach German-held territory during World War II. On October 13 she was returning from Europe to Japan when she struck a mine off Singapore and sank 3 nautical miles (5.6 km; 3.5 mi) east of Keppel Harbour.

In a separate operation, the submarine I-27 under Lieutenant Commander T. Fukumara participated in an unsuccessful midget submarine raid on Sydney Harbour at Sydney, Australia, on the night of 31 May–1 June 1942. Her midget submarine, M-14, was lost in the raid.

From September to November 1942 the squadron's submarines sank another 40 ships totaling 224,500 gross register tons in the Indian Ocean. On 11 November 1942 Aikoku Maru and Hōkoku Maru, which had supported the squadron's Indian Ocean operation earlier in the year, attacked the Dutch motor tanker MV Ondina and her escort, the Royal Indian Navy corvette Bengal in the Indian Ocean. In the ensuing battle Hokoku Maru was sunk and Ondina damaged. Both Aikoku Maru and Bengal avoided damage.

=== 1943 ===
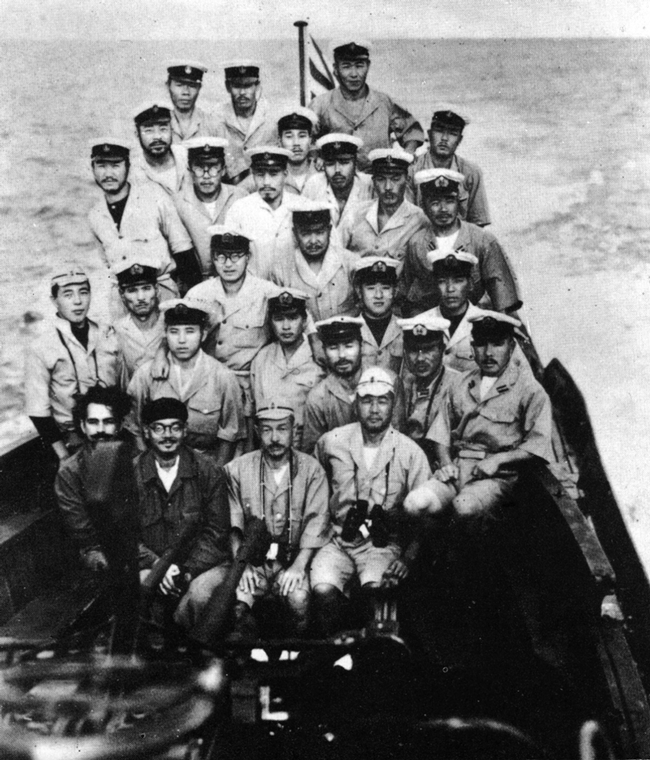
Crew of I-29

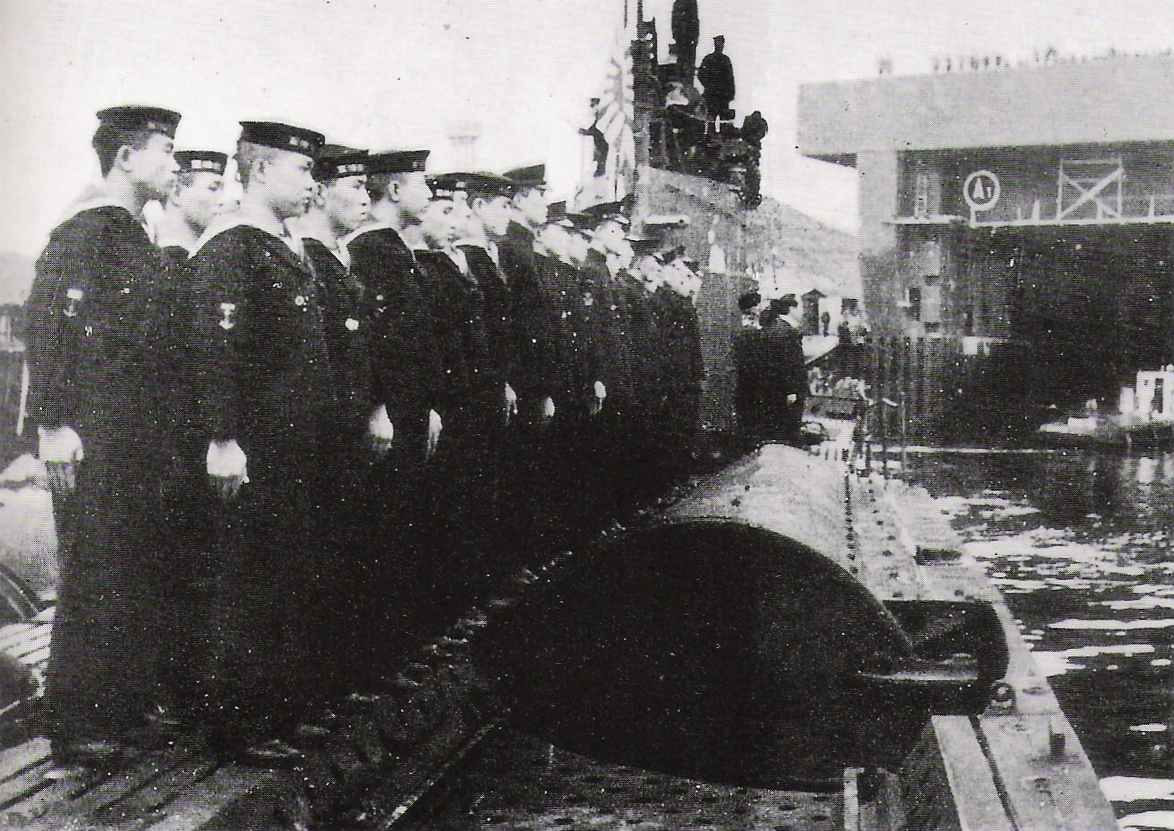
Crew of I-8 at Brest

In 1943 a further 120,000 tons of shipping was sunk in the first four months of the year. I-29 under T. Kinashi rendezvoused with U-180 400 miles SSW of Madagascar. U-180 brought Chandra Bose from Germany. I-29 then took Bose to Sumatra. Bose was to become responsible for the Indian National Army. The Army had set up a school in Penang under Captain Mahmood Khan Durrani for training Indian agents who were in turn landed in India by the squadron's submarines.

On July 6 I-8 under Captain Shinji Uchino sailed from Penang to Brest, Germany, with the crew for the German-made Ro-501. This was a 1,120-ton Type IXC U-boat. Ro-501 was sunk in the Atlantic by the destroyer escort USS Francis M. Robinson on 13 May 1944; she never reached Japanese territory. On her return voyage in September or October, I-8 was attacked by Allied aircraft off the west coast of Africa but sustained no damage. Leaving Singapore in December, she reached Japan safely and returned to Penang in early 1944 with a new commander, Tatsunosuke Ariizumo.

On August 28 the first German U-boat, U-178, arrived at Penang. I-34 was sunk in the approach to Penang on 13 November by the Royal Navy submarine HMS Taurus. I-34 was salvaged in 1961 by the Great Eastern Salvage Company and the remains of her crew cremated in a specially created shrine in Penang Bay. I-34′s ship's bell was placed in the Mariners Club in Penang.

I-29 left for Europe in November. Arriving off the Spanish coast on 10 March 1944, she and her escort of four German torpedo boats and eight German Junkers Ju 88 aircraft came under attack by Royal Air Force Coastal Command Mosquitoes and Liberator bombers. She survived the attack and arrived in Bourdeaux in occupied France. The U.S. Navy submarine USS Swordfish (SS-193) sank her during her return journey in the Bashi Channel south coast of Formosa on 26 July.

I-27 patrolled the Arabian Sea from September to December.

=== 1944 ===
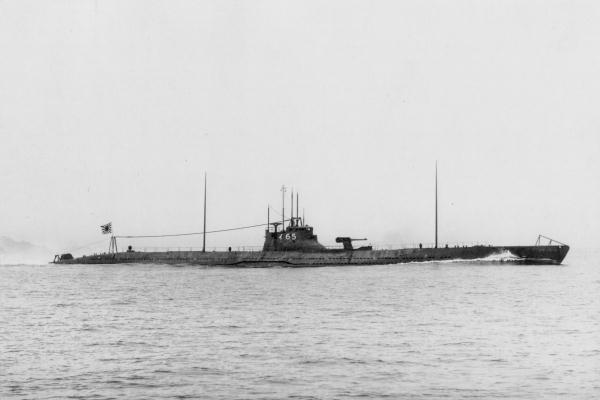
I-165

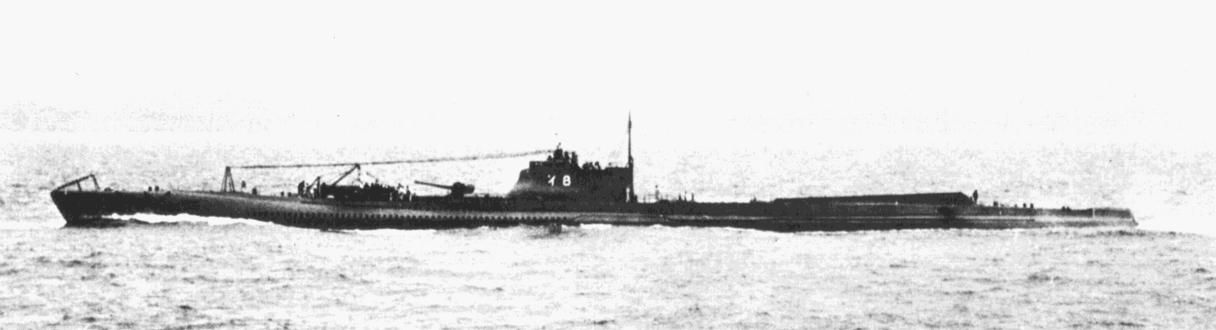
Japanese Imperial Navy submarine I-8 in 1939

On February 4 I-27 left Penang for Addu Atoll and Aden Bay. While underway, she intercepted and sank the troopship SS Khedive Ismail, but was in turn caught and sunk between the Maldive Islands and Addu Atoll by the convoy's escorts HMS Paladin and Petard.

In late February I-26 took 22 Indian National Army members to India to provide intelligence to the Japanese. The 22 were landed near Pasni (Pakistan) on March 27. I-26 was relocated to the Pacific and lost without trace in October.

On March 18 I-165 under Lt Cdr Shimizu Tsuruzo torpedoed and sank the 3,916-ton British armed merchant Nancy Moller at 02-14N, 78-25E. She surfaced, Able Seaman Gunlayer Dennis Fryer prisoner, while killing two Chinese seamen and releasing three other seamen. Before departing I-165 machine gunned the lifeboats killing 32. The British light cruiser HMS Emerald rescued 32 of the crew who had survived the attacks.

Under Ariizumo, about July, I-8 was responsible for the massacre of unarmed merchant seamen from the SS Tjisalak (98 KIA) and Jean Nicolet (63 KIA). All the German and Japanese submarines were withdrawn from Penang by the end of 1944. None of the submarines in the Squadron survived the war.

=== 1945 ===
Only I-165 survived in 1945. It was converted to a Kaiten mother ship in 1945, her gun removed and two Kaiten substituted. She was sunk by a United States Navy patrol bomber on 27 June 1945 in the Mariana Islands at 15°28′N 153°39′E. The surviving German and Italian submarines were based at Singapore.

== Commander ==
Initially the Commander Noboru Ishizaki held the rank of captain, but eventually was promoted to rear admiral on November 1, 1942. He was born on October 20, 1893, and died on August 9, 1959. During his naval career he was the commanding officer of the submarines Ro-59, Ro-22, I-155, I-156, I-153, and I-3. He had commanded at various times Submarine Divisions 27, 25, 19, 12 and 1.

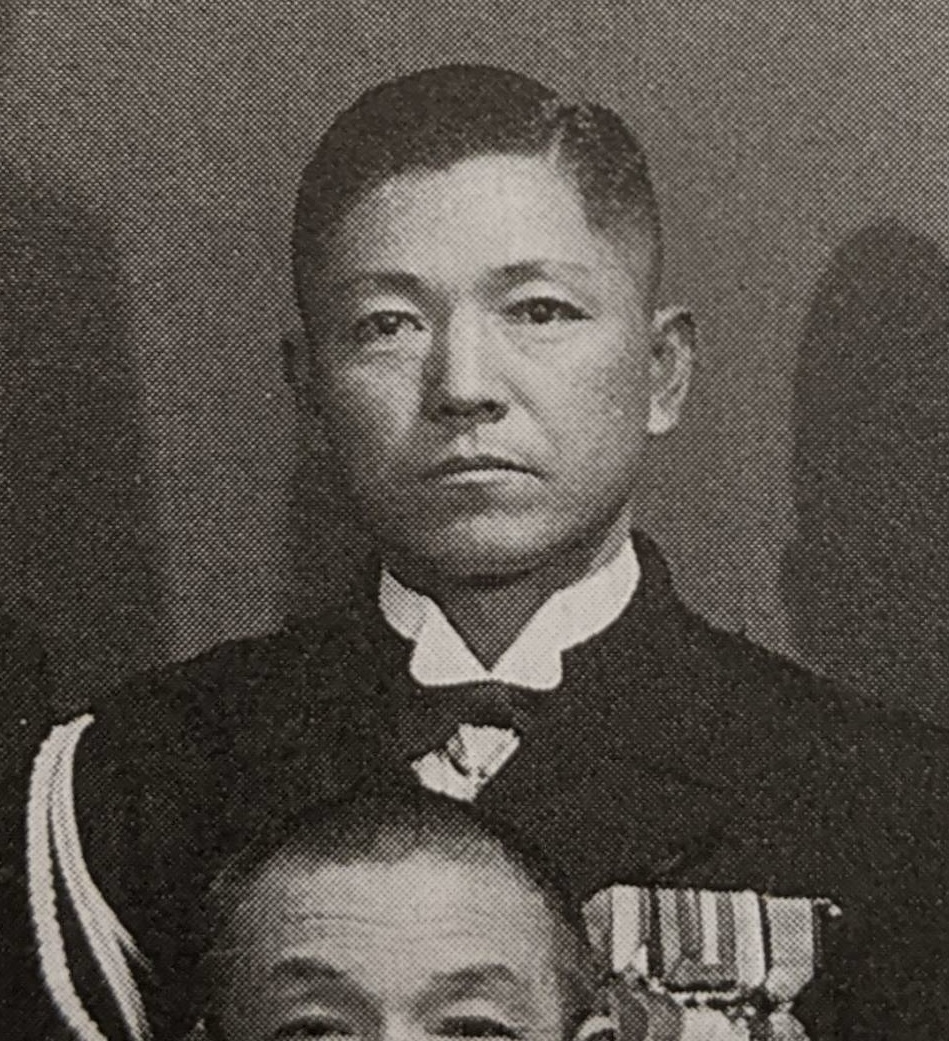
Ichioka Hisashi

Ishizaki was replaced as commander of the squadron on August 19, 1943, by Admiral Ichioka Hisashi and became commander of the 11th Submarine Squadron from October 20, 1943, until December 21, 1944. Hisashi was commander of the squadron when I-8 and I-37 committed war crimes. I-37 machine gunned sailors in lifeboats from the stricken Ascot on February 19, 1944, and the British Chivalry on February 22. I-8 under Tatsunosuke Ariizumi's command did the same to the crew of the Tjisalak on March 26, 1944, and crew of the Jean Nicolet on July 2, 1944. Because these events occurred under his command of the squadron, and because both submarines' commanders were killed in action later in the war Hisashi was charged as a war criminal. Hisashi remained commander of the squadron until September 10, 1944. He died on February 14, 1963.

== Organization ==
=== March 1942 ===
- I-10 – flagship – sunk after unsuccessfully attempting to take the Imperial Navy Submarine headquarters staff off Saipan near the Marianas July 4, 1944
- Rio de Janeiro Maru – tender – only at the base in March 1942 and sunk on 17 February 1944 by 1,000lb bombs probably dropped by Douglas SBD Dauntless's of USS Yorktown (CV-10) and Curtiss SB2C Helldiver's of USS Bunker Hill (CV-17) while at anchor east of Uman Island in the Truks.

1st Submarine Division

- Drawn from 1st Submarine Squadron, 6th (Submarine) Fleet
- I-16 – sunk by escort destroyer USS England on May 19, 1944, off the Solomon Islands
- I-18 – sunk on February 11, 1943, by USS Fletcher after being spotted by the floatplane from the USS Helena
- I-20 – sunk on October 1, 1943 USS Eaton

3rd Submarine Division

- Drawn from 1st Submarine Squadron, 6th (Submarine) Fleet
- I-21 – missing off the Gilbert Islands since November 27, 1943; presumed sunk by TBF Avengers from USS Chenango off Tarawa
- I-22 – missing off the Solomon Islands since October 4, 1942
- I-24 – lost in action against submarine chaser USS Larchmont in the Near Islands of the western Aleutians on June 11, 1943

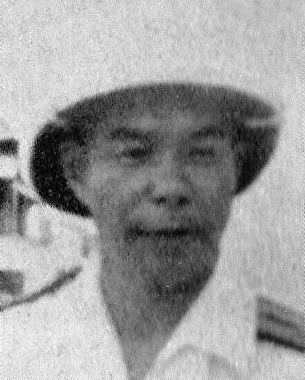
Fukumura Toshiaki - commander of I-27

14th Submarine Division

- All Type I-15 completed in 1942
- I-27 – sunk October 1944 by escorts Paladin and Petard in the Indian Ocean
- I-28 – lost on May 14, 1942 – torpedoed by the submarine USS Tautog south of Truk
- I-29 – sunk in the Bashi Channel off the south coast of Taiwan on July 26, 1944, by the submarine USS Swordfish.
- I-30 – B-1 type under Commander Shinobu Endo – sunk by mine October 13, 1942

=== 1943 ===
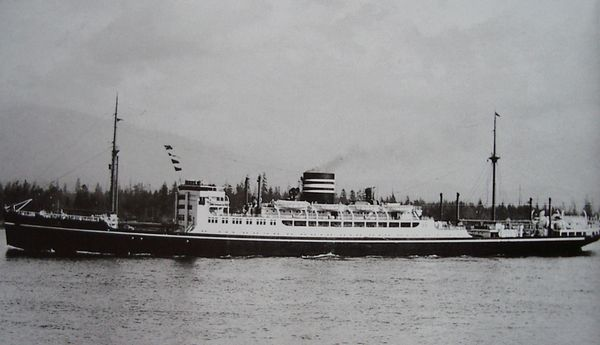
Hie Maru before it was converted to a submarine tender

- I-10 – flagship
- Hie Maru – tender (detached 1 October 1943) and sunk at 01.45N, 148.45E by USS Drum on 17 November 1943

1st Submarine Division

- Detached 10 August 1943
- I-16
- I-18
- I-20

14th Submarine Division

- Detached 10 December 1943
- I-8 – assigned 25 May 1943. Sunk in action on March 31, 1945, of Okinawa by US destroyers Stockton and Morrison.

=== 1944 ===
- I-8
- I-26 – missing off Leyte since October 25, 1944
- I-27
- I-29
- I-37 – sunk by destroyer escorts Conklin (DE-439) and McCoy Reynolds (DE-440) off Palau on November 19, 1944
- I-52 – lost on June 24, 1944, to a Mark 24 FIDO torpedo dropped by an Avenger from USS Bogue west of the Cape Verde Islands in the Atlantic
- I-165 – presumed lost east of Saipan on June 27, 1945, to a Mark 24 FIDO Torpedo from US bomber patrol Lockheed PV-2 "Harpoon" of VPB-142's 18th Wing based at Tinian
- I-166 – sunk by HMS Telemachus in the Straits of Malacca on July 17, 1944
- Ro-501 – sunk by US destroyer escort USS Francis M. Robinson (DE-220) in the Atlantic on May 13, 1944

== See also ==
- Indian Ocean in World War II
- Japanese occupation of Malaya
