= Japanese submarine I-52 (1942) =

1st class submarine of the Imperial Japanese Navy

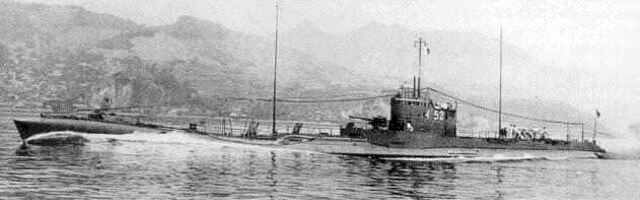
- I-52 on sea trials, December 1942

History

Japan
- Name: I-52, code-named Momi (樅, Japanese for "evergreen" or "fir tree")
- Builder: Mitsubishi Heavy Industries
- Laid down: 18 March 1942
- Commissioned: 28 December 1943
- Stricken: 10 December 1944
- Fate: Sunk on 24 June 1944

General characteristics
- Class & type: Type C2 cargo submarine
- Displacement: 2,095 long tons standard, 2,564 long tons surface, 3,644 long tons submerged
- Length: 108.5 m (356 ft)
- Beam: 9.3 m (31 ft)
- Draught: 5.12 m (17 ft)
- Propulsion: 2-shaft diesel and electric motor, 4,700 bhp (3,500 kW) surface, 1,200 shp (890 kW) submerged
- Speed: 17.7 knots (33 km/h) surface, 6.5 knots (12 km/h) submerged
- Range: 21,000 nautical miles (39,000 km) at 16 knots (30 km/h)
- Test depth: 100 m (328 ft)
- Complement: 94 officers and men, 18 civilians
- Armament: 6 x 53 cm torpedo tubes, 2 x 14 cm/40 11th Year Type naval guns, 2 x Type 96 25 mm (0.98 in) anti-aircraft guns
- Notes: Cargo: 300 metric tons

Service record
- Part of: 11th Submarine Squadron; 28 December 1943 – 10 March 1944; 8th Submarine Squadron; 10 March – 24 June 1944
- Commanders: Kaigun-chūsa Kameo Uno; 28 December 1943 – 24 June 1944
- Operations: 1st patrol; 10–21 March 1944; 2nd patrol; 21 March – 24 June 1944
- Victories: None

I-52 (伊号第五二潜水艦 (伊52), I Gō Dai Gojūni Sensuikan (I Gojūni); I-52 submarine, I-52), code-named Momi (樅; "fir tree") was a Type C2 cargo submarine of the Imperial Japanese Navy used during World War II for a secret mission to Lorient, France, then occupied by Germany, during which she was sunk.

== Valuable cargo ==
She is also known as Japan's "Golden Submarine", because she was carrying a cargo of gold to Germany as payment for matériel and technology. There has been speculation that a peace proposal to the Allies was contained on board the I-52 as well, but this is unlikely, there is no evidence that the Japanese government was interested in peace proposals or negotiated settlements at that stage in the war; and the Japanese kept an open dialogue with their diplomatic attachés via radio and diplomatic voucher through Russia, and had no need for long and uncertain transfer via a submarine bound for a Nazi-controlled area of western Europe.

It is believed that 800 kg (1,800 lb) of uranium oxide awaited I-52 for her return voyage at Lorient according to Ultra decrypts. It has been speculated that this was for the Japanese to develop a radiological weapon (a so-called "dirty bomb") for use against the United States. (The amount of unenriched uranium oxide would not have been enough to create an atomic bomb, though if used in a nuclear reactor it could have created poisonous fission products).

She was also to be fitted with a snorkel device at Lorient. In addition, 35 to 40 tons of secret documents, drawings, and strategic cargo awaited I-52's return trip to Japan: T-5 acoustic torpedoes, a Jumo 213-A motor used on the long-nosed Focke-Wulf Fw 190D fighter, radar equipment, vacuum tubes, ball bearings, bombsights, chemicals, alloy steel, and optical glass.

== Type C2 submarines ==
This class of submarines was designed and built by Mitsubishi Corporation, between 1943 and 1944, as cargo carriers. They were quite long and carried a crew of up to 94. They also had a long cruising range at a speed of 12 knots (22 km/h). The Japanese constructed only three of these submarines during World War II (I-52, I-53 and I-55), although twenty were planned. They were the largest submarines ever built at that time, before the enormous Sentoku subs were built, and were known as the most advanced Japanese submarines of their time.

The keel of I-52 was laid on 18 March 1942, and she was commissioned on 28 December 1943 into the 11th Submarine Squadron, Kure Naval District, with Commander Kameo Uno as the commanding officer. In January 1944, Admiral Mineichi Koga, the commander of the Combined Fleet, selected I-52 for a special mission to Germany.

== Yanagi missions ==
Yanagi missions were enabled under the Axis powers' Tripartite Pact to provide for an exchange of strategic materials and manufactured goods between Germany, Italy and Japan. Initially, cargo ships made the exchanges, but when that was no longer possible submarines were used.

Only five other submarines had attempted this intercontinental voyage during World War II: I-30 (April 1942), I-8 (June 1943), I-34 (October 1943), I-29 (November 1943), and German submarine U-511 (August 1943). Of these, I-30 was sunk by a mine, I-34 by the British submarine HMS Taurus, and I-29 by the United States submarine Sawfish (assisted by Ultra intelligence).

== Fatal voyage ==
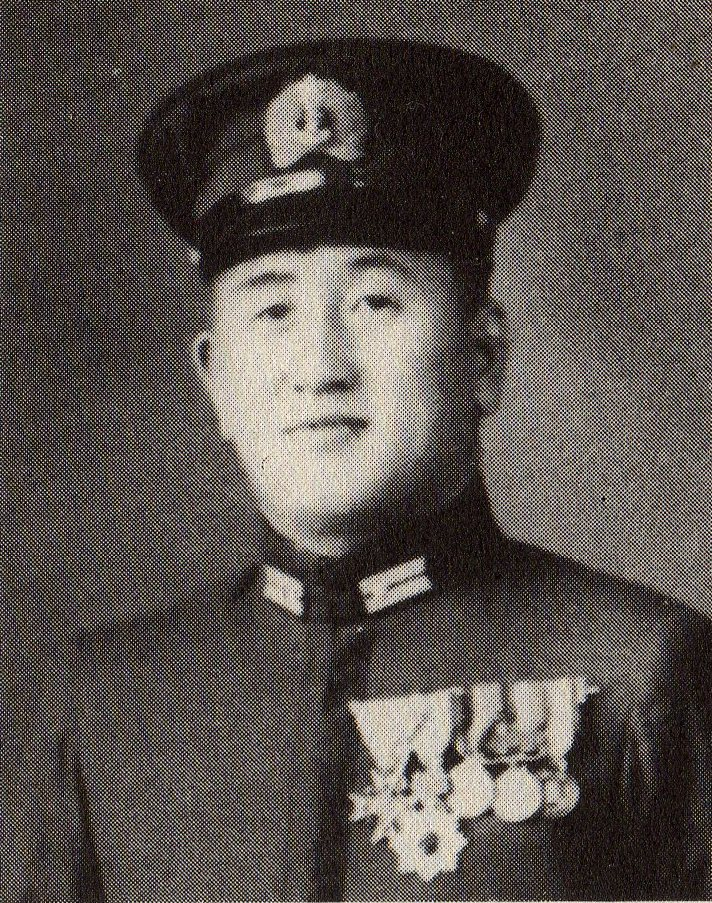
Commander Kameo Uno, the captain of I-52

On 10 March 1944, on her maiden voyage, I-52, led by Commander Kameo Uno, departed Kure via Sasebo for Singapore. Her cargo from Japan included 9.8 long tons (10.0 t) of molybdenum, 11 long tons (11 t) of tungsten, 2.2 long tons (2.2 t) of gold in 146 bars packed in 49 metal boxes, 3 long tons (3.0 t) of opium and 54 kg (119 lb) of caffeine. The gold was payment for German technology. She also carried 14 passengers, primarily Japanese technicians, who were to study German technology in anti-aircraft guns and engines for torpedo boats.

In Singapore she took on board 120 long tons (120 t) of tin in ingots, 59.8 long tons (60.8 t) of caoutchouc (raw rubber) in bales and 3.3 LT (3.4 t) of quinine, and headed through the Indian Ocean, to the Atlantic Ocean.

On 6 June 1944, the Japanese naval attaché in Berlin, Rear Admiral Kojima Hideo, signaled the submarine that the Allies had landed in Normandy, thus threatening her eventual destination of Lorient on the coast of France. She was advised to prepare for Norway instead. She was also instructed to rendezvous with a German submarine on 22 June 1944 at 21:15 (GMT) at the co-ordinates 15°N 40°W. I-52 responded with her position, being 35°N 23°W. The message was intercepted and decoded by US intelligence; I-52 had been closely watched all the way from Singapore. Guided by the F-21 Submarine Tracking Room and F-211 "Secret Room" of the Tenth Fleet which was in charge of the Atlantic section, a hunter-killer task force was targeted towards her.

On the night of 22 June 1944 about 850 nautical miles (1,574 km) west of the Cape Verde Islands off the coast of Africa, I-52 rendezvoused with U-530, a Type IXC/40 U-boat commanded by Kapitänleutnant Kurt Lange. U-530 provided her with fuel, and also transferred a Naxos FuMB 7 radar detector, and an Enigma coding machine, along with two radar operators, Petty Officers Kurt Schulze and Rolf Behrendt, and a German liaison officer for the trip through the Bay of Biscay, Kapitänleutnant Alfred Schafer.

=== US task force ===
A US task force assembled as a submarine hunter-killer group, consisting of the escort carrier USS Bogue and five destroyer escorts, en route to the United States from Europe, was ordered to find and destroy the Japanese submarine. This task force departed from Casablanca on 15 June 1944, and was commanded by Captain Aurelius B. Vosseller. It also had 9 General Motors FM-2 Wildcats and 12 Grumman TBF-1C Avengers of VC-69 on board. The task force, while on its way from Hampton Roads to Casablanca, had sunk another Japanese submarine, the Type IX RO-501 (formerly U-1224) on 13 May 1944. This was a very effective force, sinking 13 German and Japanese submarines between February 1943 and July 1945.

The five destroyer escorts were:

- USS Francis M. Robinson, Lieutenant J. E. Johansen.
- USS Haverfield, Commander T. S. Lank, TF 51 commander.
- USS Swenning, Lieutenant R. E. Peek.
- USS Willis, Lieutenant Commander G. R. Atterbury.
- USS Janssen, Lieutenant Commander H. E. Cross.

Arriving in the area of the meeting on the evening of 23 June, the carrier began launching flights of Avengers at around 23:00 GMT to search for the submarines. U-530 escaped undetected.

At approximately 23:40, Ed Whitlock, the radar operator in Lieutenant Commander Jesse D. Taylor's Avenger aircraft, detected a surface contact on his malfunctioning radar (only the right half of its sweep was working). Taylor immediately dropped flares, illuminating the area, and attacked. After his first pass, he saw the depth charge explosions just to starboard of the submarine – a near miss – and the submarine dived. Taylor dropped a purple sonobuoy, a newly developed underwater microphone that floated on the surface to pick up underwater sounds and transmit them to the aircraft. A searching aircraft usually drops these in packs of five, code-named purple, orange, blue, red and yellow (POBRY). The operator is able to monitor each buoy, in turn, to listen for sounds emitted by the enemy craft.

Hearing what sounded like submarine propeller sounds, Taylor began a torpedo attack, dropping a Mark 24 "mine". The Mark 24, code-name "Fido" and designated a "mine" for secrecy, was actually the first Allied acoustic torpedo, developed by the Harvard Underwater Sound Lab, which homed in on noises made by the submarine. Within minutes of dropping the torpedo, Taylor's sonobuoys detected the sounds of an explosion and a hull breaking up.

As Commander Taylor's watch ended, the operators on USS Bogue and Taylor all thought he had sunk the sub. However, as Taylor's patrol ended, he was relieved by Lieutenant Junior Grade William "Flash" Gordon, accompanied by civilian underwater sound expert Price Fish. They arrived on the scene just after midnight and circled with Taylor for some time. At about 0100 on 24 June 1944, Fish reported hearing some faint propeller noise in the area.

Captain Vosseller ordered a second attack; Gordon checked with Taylor about the exact position of the sonobuoy and dropped another "Fido" torpedo where he believed the submarine to be. Taylor departed the area at 0115, but Gordon stayed to circle the area and listen for any sign of activity. He heard nothing and was relieved by Lieutenant (junior grade) Brady, who continued to watch and listen, but no further activity was reported. Next morning, USS Janssen reached the site (15°16′N 39°55′W) and found flotsam: a ton of raw rubber, a piece of silk, and human flesh.

The sonobuoy recording of the last few moments of I-52's sound still survives in the US National Archives in Washington D.C. in the form of two thin-film canisters marked "Gordon wire No. 1" and "Gordon wire No. 2" dated 24 June 1944. The wire from Taylor's attack has not been found; however, a set of 78 rpm vinyl recordings that include segments of Taylor's wire recordings has been located. These records were produced during the war for training pilots. On the wire and vinyl recordings, Lieutenant Gordon can be heard talking to his crew, along with the sound of a torpedo exploding, and metal twisting. Subsequent to the discovery of the wreck (see below), analysts at the Johns Hopkins University Applied Physics Laboratory, experts in analyzing modern submarine sounds, studied these recordings and concluded that the I-52 was sunk by Taylor. The propeller sounds heard by Gordon were actually from U-530, nearly 20 miles (32 km) away, reaching Gordon's sonobuoys through a "surface duct". This quirk of underwater sound propagation traps sounds in a channel near the surface and can transmit them for many miles. At the time, the Navy credited the sinking of the I-52 to both Gordon and Taylor, as it was uncertain whether the ship was sunk on the first attack.

=== Aftermath ===
On 30 August 1944, the Kriegsmarine officially declared I-52 sunk in the Bay of Biscay as of 25 July 1944, with all 95 crew, 14 passengers, and three German personnel. The Imperial Japanese Navy declared I-52 missing on 2 August 1944, and struck her from service on 10 December 1944 as sunk.

== Recent salvage operations ==
In late 1994, a salvage operation named Project Orca was launched to try to locate the I-52 and retrieve her valuable cargo of gold. Despite the commissioning of the Russian research ship Akademik Keldysh for the project and an extensive search, by March 1995 the search had proved to be a failure (Hamilton-Paterson 1998). Very shortly afterwards, however, in the spring of 1995, Paul Tidwell, working with the ocean exploration company Meridian Sciences, Inc. (later renamed Nauticos Corp.) located the wreck 17,000 feet (5,200 metres; 3.2 miles) deep, mostly upright. The vessel was found nearly 20 miles (32 km) from the datum quoted by the U.S. Navy at the time of the sinking, but within 1/2 mile (0.80 km) of the coordinates computed by Meridian. Meridian's analysts used historical ship logs from the U.S. task force as well as from the German U-boat to reconstruct the events of the battle and correct navigation errors using a process called "re-navigation," or RENAV. Her conning tower is intact and her hull number is still visible. The bow is broken up, probably due to impact on the bottom, and a large hole, probably caused by one of the torpedoes, is aft of the conning tower. Debris was scattered over a large area. Plans were made to raise the sub and recover the gold. The Japanese government objected, indicating that they considered the wreck site a grave. Tidwell worked on the proper procedures with the Japanese government and received the approval of the war graves authorities in Japan. Tidwell's team took down a Japanese naval ensign and affixed it to the wrecked submarine. A metal box from the debris field was brought to the surface in the hope that it would contain some of the sunken gold (worth US$25 million at that time – US$109,085,000 in 2020), but when opened, the salvors were disappointed to find not gold, but opium. It was dumped overboard.

The plan was to recover the entire conning tower, diplomatic pouches, gold, coding equipment, (Japanese and German) and more. The recovered items would be taken to New Orleans for cleaning, conservation, and corrosion treatment to prepare for an exhibition. Mandalay Bay Casino had offered $20 million for the exhibition. After three years in Las Vegas everything except the gold would be returned to Japan to be placed at the city of Kure in a permanent exhibition.

There are no full-size Japanese World War II submarines on display anywhere in the world; however, captured Japanese midget submarines are on display at the Admiral Nimitz Museum in Fredericksburg, Texas, at the USS Bowfin Submarine Museum & Park, close to Pearl Harbor, Hawaii, and at the Australian War Memorial, Canberra.

The Japan Times reported that Tidwell intended to return to the site and raise the submarine in November 2005 or May 2006. However, as of March 2021, Tidwell's plans have not been fulfilled.

== Media coverage ==
- In 2000 the National Geographic Society commissioned and produced a documentary called, Submarine I-52: Search for WWII Gold, on the I-52 and Tidwell's salvage effort.
- The October 1999 issue of the National Geographic featured an article on the I-52 sinking and salvage.
