= SS Tjisalak =

Dutch freighter (built 1917, sunk 1944)

Coordinates: 2°30′S 78°40′E

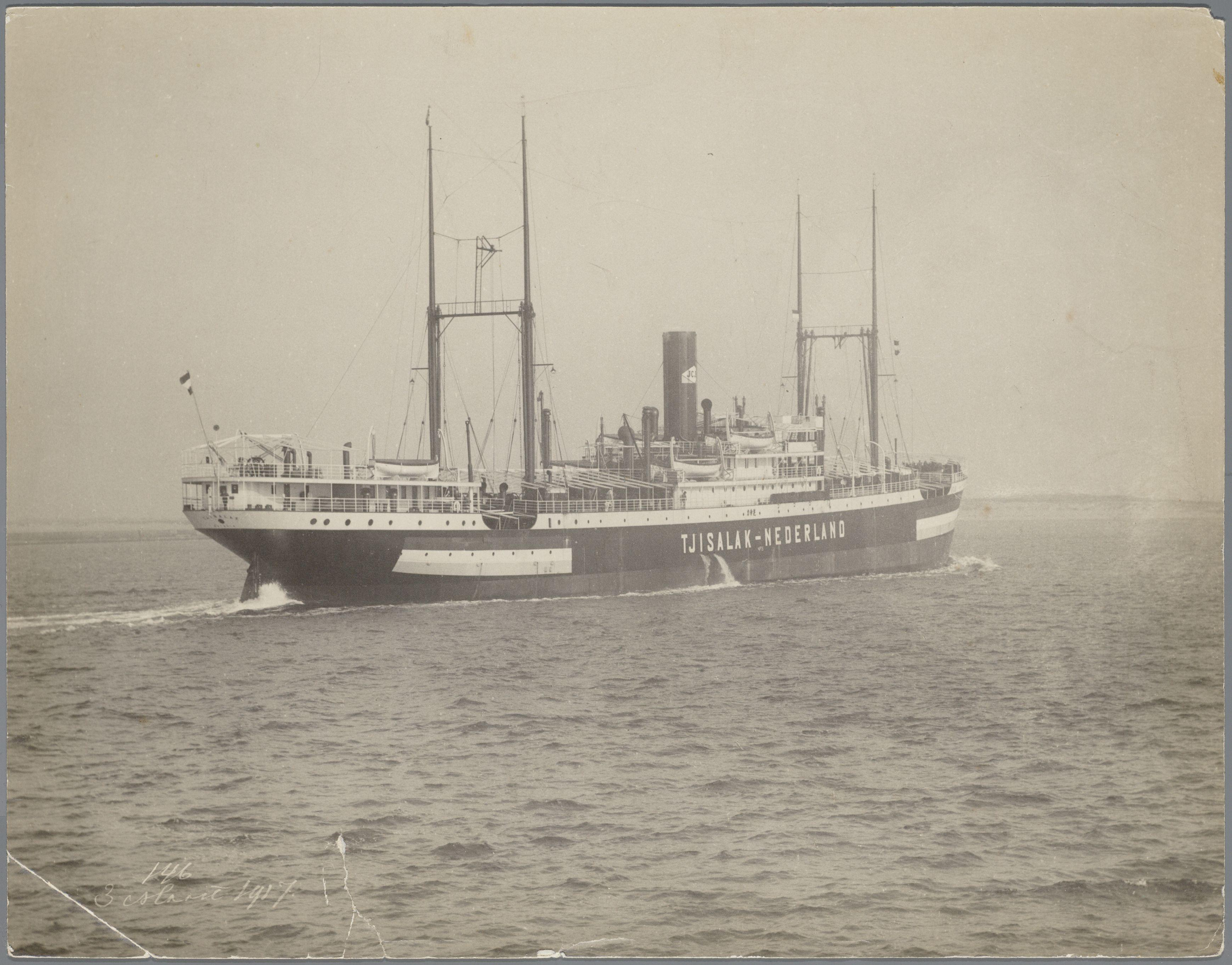
- SS Tjisalak in 1917

History
- Owner: Java-China-Japan Lijn
- Launched: 1917
- Fate: Sunk 1944

General characteristics
- Tonnage: 5,787 tons

SS Tjisalak was a 5,787-ton Dutch freighter with passenger accommodation built in 1917 for the Java-China-Japan Lijn and used by the Allies during World War II to transport supplies across the Indian Ocean between Australia and Ceylon. On 26 March 1944, she was torpedoed and sunk by the Japanese submarine I-8 while traveling unescorted. The freighter's crew were subsequently massacred in an infamous naval war crime.

== The sinking ==
Tjisalak was sailing from Melbourne to Colombo with a cargo of flour and mail. The crew of 80 consisted of Dutch, Chinese and English merchant seamen, plus ten Royal Navy gunners manning the ship's four-inch gun. Also on board were five passengers (including an American Red Cross nurse, Verna Gorden-Britten) and 22 Laskar sailors returning to India after the loss of their ship. Tjisalak had been travelling for 19 days, when her captain became confused by an unusual wireless message from Perth, and changed his course, sailing at 10 knots (19 km/h; 12 mph) to conserve fuel. At 5:45 am on 26 March 1944, she was struck by a torpedo from the Japanese submarine I-8.

One passenger, a Lieutenant Dawson from Australia, was killed instantly, and the ship began to list to port. The order was given to abandon ship. Most of the crew obeyed, taking to the ship's boats and liferafts, but the British gunners and the Dutch gun commander, second officer Jan Dekker, remained on board, waiting for the Japanese submarine to appear and opened fire. I-8 responded with her own deckgun, forcing the gunners to abandon ship.

== The massacre ==
Once in the water, the 105 survivors were collected by the Japanese, who placed them on I-8's deck and ordered Captain Hen into the conning tower to confer with the Japanese commander, Tatsunosuke Ariizumi. Survivors reported Hen as shouting "No, no, I don't know." At that moment, a Chinese sailor slipped into the water and was shot.

The Japanese then tied the survivors together in pairs and walked them aft around the conning tower, where they were attacked with various weapons. Four men jumped or fell from the submarine while being attacked and survived the random gunfire from three Japanese sailors seated behind the conning tower. These were Chief Officer Frits de Jong, Second Officer Jan Dekker, Second Wireless Operator James Blears, and Third Engineer Cees Spuybroek. A Laskar named Dhange also survived the massacre.

After the Japanese had killed all but about twenty of the prisoners, they tied the remainder to a long rope, pushed them overboard, and then submerged. Dhange, the last man on the tow rope, managed to free himself before he drowned.

== The survivors ==
The survivors swam several miles through the open ocean back to the location of the sinking, where they found an abandoned liferaft. Three days later they spotted a distant shape, which approached them. She was an American Liberty ship, SS James O. Wilder. After briefly firing on them by mistake, the Americans rescued the survivors and took them to Colombo.

As merchant seamen, the Tjisalak survivors were ineligible for treatment at both the British military and civilian hospitals, and had to arrange for accommodations at their own expense.

== Aftermath ==
The crew of I-8 committed similar atrocities against the crew of the Liberty ship SS Jean Nicolet, and possibly other ships from which no one survived. Captain Ariizumi committed suicide when Japan surrendered in August 1945, but three members of the crew were located and prosecuted for their participation. Two were convicted and served prison terms which were commuted by the Japanese government in 1955. The third was granted immunity in exchange for testifying against his former shipmates.
