= German submarine U-1224 =

German World War II submarine

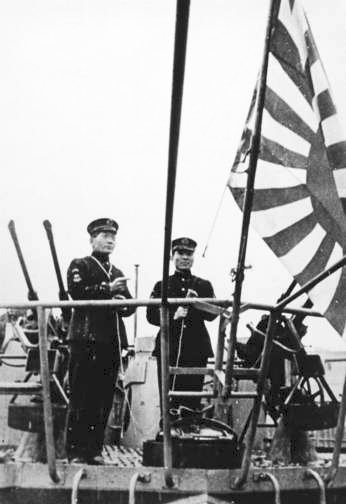
- One of the few known photos of U-1224: Japanese officers on its conning tower at the hand-over ceremony to the Imperial Japanese Navy

History

Nazi Germany
- Name: U-1224
- Ordered: 25 August 1941
- Builder: Deutsche Werft, Hamburg
- Yard number: 387
- Laid down: 30 November 1942
- Launched: 7 July 1943
- Commissioned: 20 October 1943
- Decommissioned: 15 February 1944
- Fate: Transferred to Japanese service

Empire of Japan
- Name: Ro-501
- Acquired: 15 February 1944
- In service: 15 February 1944
- Fate: Sunk on 13 May 1944
- Notes: Used as a training ship

General characteristics
- Class & type: Type IXC/40 submarine
- Displacement: 1,144 t (1,126 long tons) surfaced; 1,257 t (1,237 long tons) submerged
- Length: 76.76 m (251 ft 10 in) o/a; 58.75 m (192 ft 9 in) pressure hull
- Beam: 6.86 m (22 ft 6 in) o/a; 4.44 m (14 ft 7 in) pressure hull
- Height: 9.60 m (31 ft 6 in)
- Draught: 4.67 m (15 ft 4 in)
- Installed power: 4,400 PS (3,200 kW; 4,300 bhp) (diesels); 1,000 PS (740 kW; 990 shp) (electric)
- Propulsion: 2 shafts; 2 × diesel engines; 2 × electric motors
- Speed: 18.3 knots (33.9 km/h; 21.1 mph) surfaced; 7.3 knots (13.5 km/h; 8.4 mph) submerged
- Range: 13,850 nmi (25,650 km; 15,940 mi) at 10 knots (19 km/h; 12 mph) surfaced; 63 nmi (117 km; 72 mi) at 4 knots (7.4 km/h; 4.6 mph) submerged
- Test depth: 230 m (750 ft)
- Complement: 4 officers, 44 enlisted
- Armament: 6 × torpedo tubes (4 bow, 2 stern); 22 × 53.3 cm (21 in) torpedoes; 1 × 3.7 cm (1.5 in) Flak M42 AA gun; 2 x twin 2 cm (0.79 in) C/30 AA guns

Service record (Kriegsmarine)
- Part of: 31st U-boat Flotilla; 20 October 1943 – 15 February 1944
- Identification codes: M 53 122
- Commanders: Kptlt. Georg Preuss; 20 October 1943 – 15 February 1944
- Operations: None
- Victories: None

Service record (IJN)
- Part of: 8th Submarine Squadron; 15 February – 13 May 1944
- Commanders: Kaigun-shōsa Sadatoshi Norita; 15 February – 13 May 1944
- Operations: Marco Polo II
- Victories: None

German submarine U-1224 was a Type IXC/40 U-boat of Nazi Germany's Kriegsmarine built for service during World War II. She was constructed by Deutsche Werft of Hamburg, and was commissioned on 20 October 1943, with Kapitänleutnant Georg Preuss in command. She was assigned to the 31st U-boat Flotilla, a submarine training unit.

In late 1943 and early 1944, she was used as a training ship for Japanese sailors. In the summer of 1943 a full crew of Japanese submariners arrived in Germany to be trained on the operations of German U-boats, on the initiative of the German naval attaché in Japan, Paul Wenneker, who wanted to share German submarine knowledge and technology with the Japanese. U-1224 was transferred into Japanese service on 15 February 1944, after the Japanese crew spent several months training in the Baltic Sea. While in Kiel, she was commissioned in the Imperial Japanese Navy as Ro-501, and shortly afterwards departed for Japan, along with a cargo of war materials and four Japanese naval engineers who had been studying in Germany.

Ro-501 was sunk on 13 May 1944 on her way to Japan by a U.S. Navy anti-submarine hunter-killer group, about 500 nautical miles off Cape Verde in the Atlantic, after spending two days trying to evade the pursuers.

== Design ==
German Type IXC/40 submarines were slightly larger than the original Type IXCs. U-1224 had a displacement of 1,144 tonnes (1,126 long tons) when at the surface and 1,257 tonnes (1,237 long tons) while submerged. The U-boat had a total length of 76.76 m (251 ft 10 in), a pressure hull length of 58.75 m (192 ft 9 in), a beam of 6.86 m (22 ft 6 in), a height of 9.60 m (31 ft 6 in), and a draught of 4.67 m (15 ft 4 in). The submarine was powered by two MAN M 9 V 40/46 supercharged four-stroke, nine-cylinder diesel engines producing a total of 4,400 metric horsepower (3,240 kW; 4,340 shp) for use while surfaced, two Siemens-Schuckert 2 GU 345/34 double-acting electric motors producing a total of 1,000 shaft horsepower (1,010 PS; 750 kW) for use while submerged. She had two shafts and two 1.92 m (6 ft) propellers. The boat was capable of operating at depths of up to 230 metres (750 ft).

The submarine had a maximum surface speed of 18.3 knots (33.9 km/h; 21.1 mph) and a maximum submerged speed of 7.3 knots (13.5 km/h; 8.4 mph). When submerged, the boat could operate for 63 nautical miles (117 km; 72 mi) at 4 knots (7.4 km/h; 4.6 mph); when surfaced, she could travel 13,850 nautical miles (25,650 km; 15,940 mi) at 10 knots (19 km/h; 12 mph). U-1224 was fitted with six 53.3 cm (21 in) torpedo tubes (four fitted at the bow and two at the stern), 22 torpedoes, and a 3.7 cm (1.5 in) Flak M42 as well as two twin 2 cm (0.79 in) C/30 anti-aircraft guns. The boat had a complement of forty-eight.

=== Flak weaponry ===
U-1224/Ro-501 was mounted with a single 3.7 cm Flakzwilling M43U gun on the LM 42U mount. The LM 42U mount was the most common mount used with the 3.7 cm Flak M42U. The 3.7 cm Flak M42U was the marine version of the 3.7 cm Flak used by the Kriegsmarine on Type VII and Type IX U-boats.

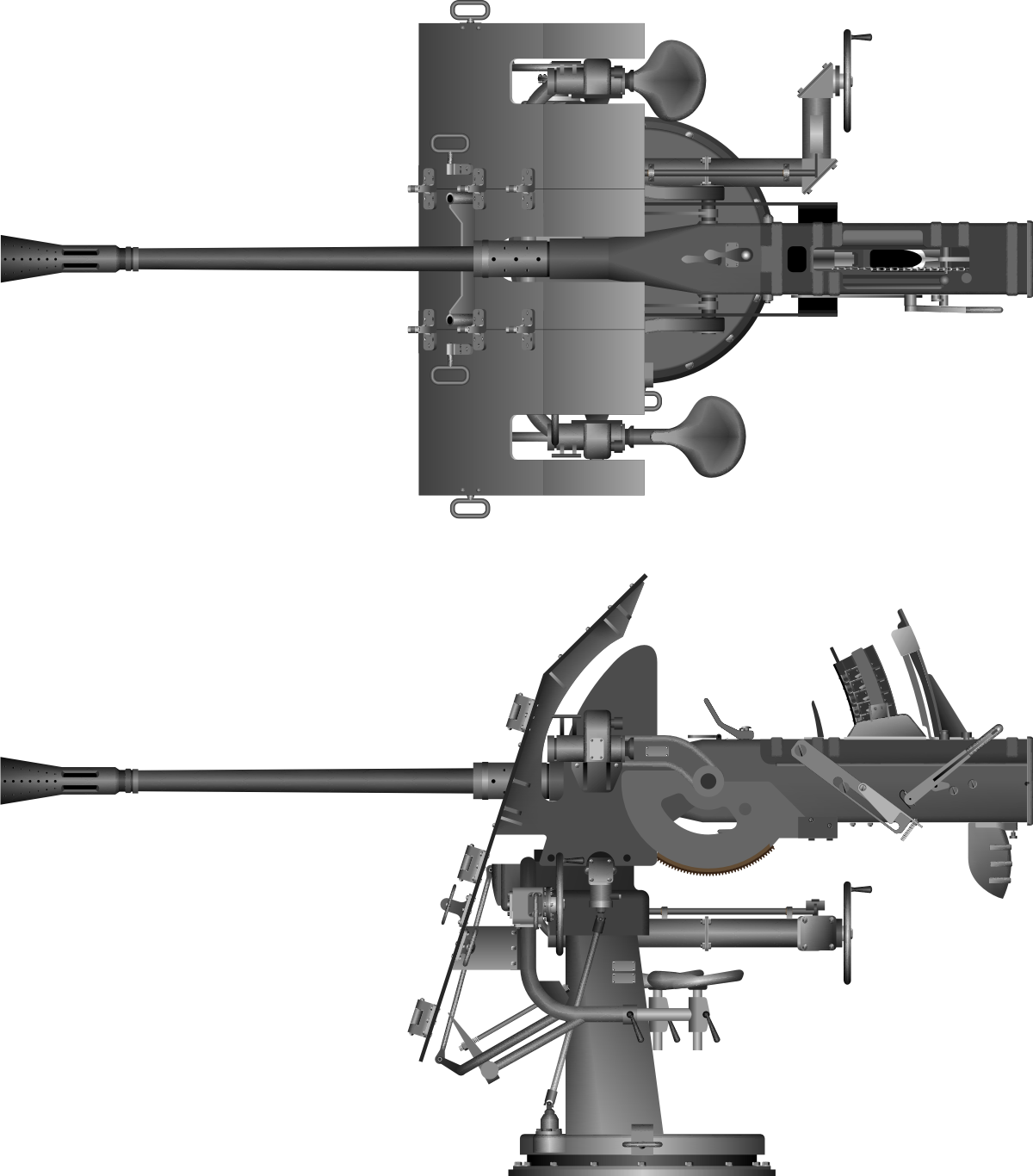
A single 3.7 cm Flak M42U gun on the LM 42U mount.

== Service history ==
=== Kriegsmarine ===
The submarine's keel was laid down on 30 November 1942 by Blohm & Voss of Hamburg. She was commissioned on 20 October 1943, with Kapitänleutnant Georg Preuss as her commanding officer. U-1224 was assigned to the 31st U-boat Flotilla for training purposes, and was selected to be used as a training ship for Japanese sailors before she was even commissioned.

U-1224 became part of the transfer of technology and knowledge missions that existed between Japan and Germany during World War II. A full crew of Japanese personnel was to be trained by the Germans to operate a U-boat, after which the boat would be gifted to Japan. This training mission was arranged by the German naval attaché in Tokyo, Vizeadmiral Paul Wenneker, who wanted to share German submarine technology and tactics with the Japanese. He advocated for giving German submarines to Japan and to train Japanese submariners in Germany. In August 1943, Lieutenant Commander Sadatoshi Norita and a 48-man Japanese crew arrived in France aboard submarine I-8, and proceeded to Germany by train, where they began working with a small crew of Kriegsmarine sailors in the Baltic from October 1943 until February 1944 in German submarine handling.

U-1224 was to become the second submarine to be transferred to Japan by the Germans, after Adolf Hitler made the decision in February 1943 to send two Kriegsmarine U-boats to Japan as part of a campaign against Allied sea lines of communication in the Indian Ocean. The head of the navy, Großadmiral Karl Dönitz, was against giving German submarines to the Japanese as he believed that Germany needed all of its U-boats in the Atlantic, and thought that Japanese and German crews would not get along well, but he was overruled by Hitler. The first, U-511, was code-named "Marco Polo I" and departed Germany in May 1943, carrying along with its German crew several passengers that included engineering officers, the Japanese naval attaché Naokuni Nomura, and the diplomat Ernst Woermann, who was going to take up his post as German ambassador to the pro-Japanese collaborationist Wang Jingwei regime in China. She also had some supplies for the Indian Ocean-based German Monsun Gruppe. U-511 successfully arrived in Penang, Japanese-occupied Malaysia, in July 1943, where the supplies were offloaded, and then arrived in Kure, Japan, in August 1943. She was then commissioned into the Imperial Japanese Navy as Ro-500. Therefore U-1224 was code-named "Marco Polo II" by the Germans.

=== Imperial Japanese Navy ===
After the crew underwent three months of training, U-1224 was recommissioned into the Imperial Japanese Navy as Ro-501, on 15 February 1944. Lieutenant Commander Sadatoshi Norita was formally appointed her commanding officer, and Ro-501 was nicknamed "Satsuki No. 2" by her new Japanese crew, who then spent several weeks from late February to late March 1944 doing further training at the U-boat anti-aircraft school in Swinemunde. Ro-501 was to be assigned to the 8th Submarine Squadron, which was based in Malaysia.

==== Marco Polo II ====
Germany and Japan were separated by great distance, and by 1944 they were increasingly cut off from each other. While neither power was able to send meaningful reinforcements or armaments through territory controlled by the Allied powers, they were able to use submarines to share some intelligence and weapons blueprints. Submarines offered security and their stealth allowed for a fair chance of success. At the end of March 1944, several Japanese naval engineering officers that had been studying in Germany, led by Captain Tetsuhiro Emi, arrived in Kiel, where they boarded Ro-501 and departed for Japan along with some war materials. They also took with them mercury, lead, steel, uncut optical glass and aluminum, along with the blueprints to construct a Type IX submarine and a Messerschmitt Me 163 "Komet" jet fighter.

U-1224 arrived in Norway on 30 March 1944 to refuel, and continued on her journey in early April, initially along with the German submarine U-859, which was also carrying a cargo of war material bound for Japan.

==== Sinking ====
The intended route to Penang was to take Ro-501 through the middle of the Atlantic Ocean west of the Azores and the Cape Verde Islands, then around the Cape of Good Hope. She was to rendezvous with I-8 in the Indian Ocean to refuel before proceeding to her destination. However, at 30°0′0″N 37°0′0″W, Ro-501 ran into a U.S. Navy hunter-killer group comprising escort carrier USS Bogue and five destroyer escorts, including USS Francis M. Robinson. The group's presence forced Ro-501 underwater for two days, during which her batteries were depleted and her captain, Lt. Cmdr. Norita, radioed a coded signal that he was being pursued. This transmission was detected by the American ships with their high-frequency direction finding ("Huff-Duff") equipment, enabling them to pinpoint the submarine's location.

The Francis M. Robinson reported a submerged contact at 19:00 on 13 May 1944. The destroyer escort engaged the contact with a full salvo from her forward-throwing Hedgehog mount, followed by five salvos of magnetic proximity fuzed depth charges. Four underwater explosions were detected. In early July 1944, the German naval attaché in Japan, Paul Wenneker, sent a message to Berlin asking about the status of Ro-501, to which he received the answer that U-boat Command had not heard from the submarine since 11 May. On 26 August 1944, she was presumed to be lost by the German Navy with all 56 hands aboard – 52 Japanese crew (including a German radar operator and a German pilot) plus four Japanese officer passengers. She was struck from the navy list on 10 October 1944. Her commanding officer, Norita, received a posthumous promotion to the rank of commander from the Imperial Japanese Navy, as did one of the passengers, Tetsuhiro Emi, to rear admiral.

The final resting place of U-1224/Ro-501 is 500 nautical miles (930 km; 580 mi) west-northwest of the Cape Verde islands near 18°7′59″N 33°12′59″W in 2,900 feet (880 m) of water. This is a few miles from where USS Buckley sank U-66. The wreck has never been discovered.

== Bibliography ==
- Busch, Rainer; Röll, Hans-Joachim (1999). German U-boat commanders of World War II : a biographical dictionary. Translated by Brooks, Geoffrey. London, Annapolis, Md: Greenhill Books, Naval Institute Press. ISBN 1-55750-186-6.
- Busch, Rainer; Röll, Hans-Joachim (1999). Deutsche U-Boot-Verluste von September 1939 bis Mai 1945 [German U-boat losses from September 1939 to May 1945]. Der U-Boot-Krieg (in German). Vol. IV. Hamburg, Berlin, Bonn: Mittler. ISBN 3-8132-0514-2.
- Gröner, Erich; Jung, Dieter; Maass, Martin (1991). German Warships 1815–1945, U-boats and Mine Warfare Vessels. Vol. 2. Translated by Thomas, Keith; Magowan, Rachel. London: Conway Maritime Press. ISBN 0-85177-593-4.
- Preisler, Jerome; Sewell, Kenneth (2013). Code Name Caesar: The Secret Hunt for U-Boat 864 During World War II. Penguin Publishing Group. ISBN 978-0425253625.
