= Dynamic trimming =

Dynamic trimming or dynamic trim optimization is an automated process used to control the trim of a large ship. The trim of a ship is the height difference between the draft of its hull. It represents the angle at which the ship is floating, relative to a designated waterline. This angle is optimized using ballast to achieve minimum water resistance and reduce fuel consumption.

A dynamic trimming system operates continually on seagoing vessels and uses multidimensional analysis of real-time data on vessel attitude collected automatically from sensor networks. The system continuously calculates the key forces affecting the vessel attitude. The key metrics are graphically displayed in specialized software to facilitate decision-making. The system helps officers ensure that their vessels are operated efficiently.
