= Noboru Ishizaki =

Japanese Imperial Navy rear admiral (1893-1959)

- 石崎 昇
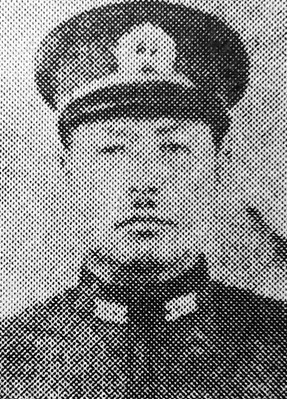
- Born: October 20, 1893
- Died: August 9, 1959 (aged 65)
- Education: Imperial Japanese Naval Academy
- Military career
- Allegiance: Empire of Japan
- Branch: Imperial Japanese Navy
- Rank: Rear Admiral
- Commands: 8th Submarine Squadron; Submarine Squadron 11
- Conflicts: World War II; Battle of Madagascar

Noboru Ishizaki (石崎 昇, Ishizaki Noboru; October 20, 1893 – August 9, 1959), was a Japanese rear admiral in the Imperial Japanese Navy during World War II. Ishizaki commanded the 8th Submarine Squadron during the Battle of Madagascar in 1942.

Ishizaki was serving as the commander of Submarine Squadron 11 when he arranged for the new submarine Ro-44 to test an experimental air-search radar borrowed from Kure Naval Air Station while she was conducting work-ups in the Iyo-nada in the Seto Inland Sea on 13 and 14 November 1943. After he reported the results of the tests, he was rebuffed because he conducted them without the approval of the Navy Technical Department.
