= Yanagi missions =

Series of WWII submarine voyages by Japan

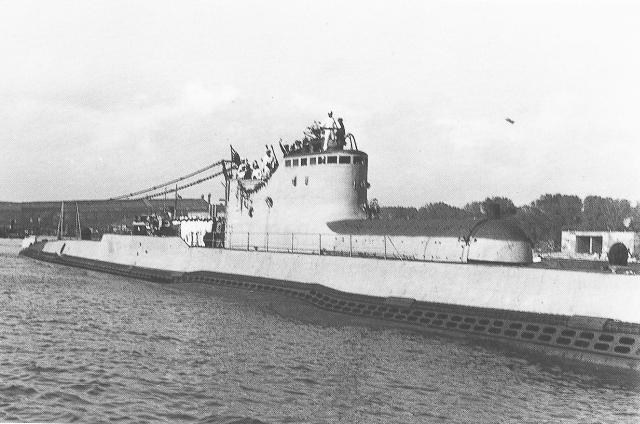
I-30 arriving at Lorient, France, in 1942 on a Yanagi mission

The Yanagi missions (柳作戦, Yanagi sakusen; lit. 'Willow Missions'), or more formally the Submarine Missions to Germany (遣独潜水艦作戦, Kendoku sensuikan sakusen), were a series of submarine voyages undertaken by the Imperial Japanese Navy (IJN) during the Second World War, to exchange technology, skills and materials with Japan's Axis partners, principally Nazi Germany. These voyages had to run the gauntlet of the Western Allies naval superiority in the Indian and Atlantic Oceans; of the five westbound voyages, three arrived safely, with two submarines sunk en route, while of the three successful vessels only one completed her return voyage, with two sunk before reaching home.

The Yanagi missions were matched by several reciprocal voyages by German U-boats, though these were outside the Yanagi scheme, as were several blockade-running cargo voyages to and from the Far East.

== Background ==
In December 1941 the Tripartite Pact signed by Germany, Italy, and Japan was amended to include a military agreement, which included a section on increasing German-Japanese cooperation by establishing transportation corridors for exchanging supplies and technical experts. Because the German invasion of the Soviet Union closed off the land route, the agreement called for air and sea transportation that would go around Soviet territory. The aerial route that avoided Soviet airspace proved to be too much for existing aircraft to handle at that time, so most of the shipping was done by sea, from the Atlantic through the Indian Ocean to the Pacific. The early Yanagi missions between 1941 and late 1942 were done by surface blockade runners. In the first year, twelve surface ships arrived in German-occupied France and delivered around 60,000 tons of supplies from the Far East with minimal disruption from the British. But after the summer of 1942, as the British began intercepting Japanese diplomatic communications and the Royal Air Force mined the Bay of Biscay, the attacks on blockade runners became more effective, and by the summer of 1943 the Germans had only received one-third of the quantity that they had in the previous year. In the spring of 1943, Hiroshi Oshima, the Japanese ambassador in Germany, had conversations with senior German officials in which they considered using submarines instead of surface ships. As early as December 1941, Hitler had told Oshima that Germany could use submarines to establish transportation links with Japan in the long term. The commander of the Kriegsmarine at the time, Grand Admiral Erich Raeder, opposed the plan as it would divert the navy from his priority of building more surface ships.

The situation changed in early 1943 when Grand Admiral Karl Dönitz replaced Raeder as the head of the Kriegsmarine. By this point, the majority of blockade runners were being caught by the Allies along the way, and Dönitz was more supportive of the idea of outfitting submarines to use as cargo transports. The Japanese control over Malaya and Indonesia led the German high command to consider sending U-boats through the Indian Ocean to southeast Asia. As the Kriegsmarine lost control of the sea, by mid-1943 they began using U-boats for the missions to Japan instead of surface ships. As the war progressed, the Japanese considered supplies and technical expertise from Germany to be increasingly important. Initially the Germans faced logistical difficulties. In January 1943, Ambassador Oshima told Hitler that the Imperial Japanese Navy was building twenty large cargo submarines for the Yanagi missions. The Kriegsmarine also considered building cargo submarines (designated Type XX U-boat), but because of limited resources this project was never implemented. They ended up using several Type IX long-range U-boats, several Type X mine-laying U-boats, and one Type XIV U-tanker.

== The Yanagi missions ==
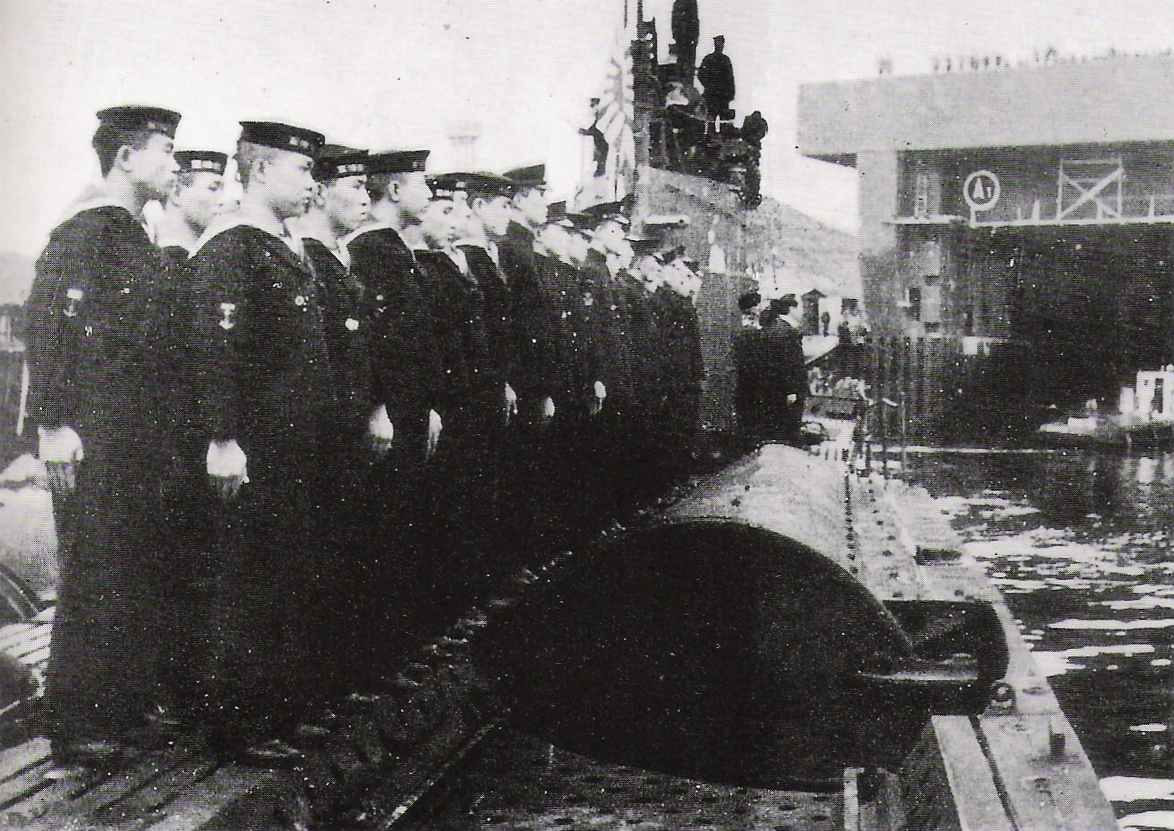
I-8 and her crew in Brest, France, in 1943

The Yanagi missions were:

In April 1942 I-30 departed Kure, Japan with a cargo of mica and shellac, and plans of the Type 91 aerial torpedo; after missions in the Indian Ocean with other IJN submarines, she detached in June to proceed to Lorient, arriving there in August 1942. She departed France later that month carrying German military technology, including plans for and a complete set of a Würzburg radar, eight torpedoes and five torpedo data computers, anti-tank guns, diamonds, 20mm anti-aircraft guns, and fifty Enigma machines, and arrived at Singapore in October. However, she struck a British mine on leaving Singapore for the last stage to Japan. Some equipment was salvaged, but most was lost.

In June 1943 I-8 departed Kure with plans of the IJN's Type 95 torpedo, a reconnaissance aircraft and submarine equipment, and collected a cargo of tin, rubber and quinine at Singapore. She also carried a spare crew of 48 men from Kure tasked with bringing back a German U-boat, U-1224, which the Kriegsmarine had transferred to the IJN for examination and reverse engineering. The I-8 rendezvoused with the German submarine U-161 from Lorient who transferred two German technicians who installed a radar detector. She arrived at Brest in August. I-8 departed France in October 1943 with a variety of German technology, including: bomb and anti-aircraft gunsights, marine chronometers, a Daimler-Benz torpedo boat engine, electric torpedoes, machine guns, and penicillin, arriving at Kure in December after a round-trip voyage of 30,000 miles (48,000 km).

In October 1943 I-34 departed Kure for Singapore. At Singapore, she picked up a cargo of tin, tungsten, rubber and opium. She departed Singapore on 11 November but was intercepted and sunk on 13 November in the Straits of Malacca by the British submarine HMS Taurus.

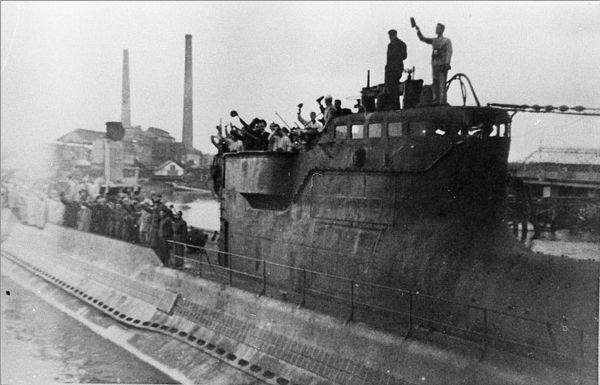
I-29 in Lorient, France, 1944

In November 1943 I-29 departed Kure for Singapore to pick up a cargo of tin, tungsten, zinc, rubber and quinine. She departed Singapore in December 1943 for Nazi-occupied France, and reached the Bay of Biscay in March 1944. She was escorted by German warships and aircraft and came under heavy attack by Allied aircraft, but arrived safely at Lorient. I-29 departed Lorient in April 1944 with considerable German technology, including a Walter rocket engine and plans for the jet-powered Me 262 and the rocket-powered Me 163. She arrived at Singapore in July, but was sunk with her cargo en route to Japan in the Luzon Strait by the American submarine USS Sawfish on 26 July 1944.

In March 1944 I-52 left Kure with a cargo of metals, including gold, and a team of technicians who were to study German anti-aircraft techniques, stopping at Singapore to pick up other cargo, including rubber and opium. I-52 reached the South Atlantic and successfully rendezvoused with U-530 from Lorient on 23 June to embark a German liaison officer, two radio operators, the current German naval code and a Naxos radar detector. However, that night she was detected by radar-equipped Grumman TBF Avenger aircraft from an American hunter-killer group centered on the escort carrier USS Bogue, which dropped sonobuoys and "Fido" homing torpedoes, sinking I-52 with all hands (95 crew, 14 passengers and the three German sailors) near 15°16′N 39°55′W, west of the Cape Verde Islands. It is believed that on her return voyage to Japan she would have been carrying uranium oxide.

I-52's voyage was the last Yanagi mission undertaken by the IJN.

== Reciprocal voyages ==
The German U-boat arm made several reciprocal exchange voyages, though these were outside the Yanagi scheme; they also made a number of blockade-running voyages, also separate from the Yanagi missions.

From February to June 1943 U-180 sailed to the Indian Ocean from Kiel, meeting with I-29 in the Mozambique Channel. U-180 transferred Subash Chandra Bose, future leader of the Indian National Army, and received two tons of gold picked up from Penang in payment for German goods so far received.

In May 1943 U-511 sailed for Japan from Lorient, arriving in Kure in August. Code-named 'Marco Polo I' she was transferred to the IJN as an exchange in submarine technology, and was commissioned by them as RO-500.

In February 1944 U-1224, code-named 'Marco Polo II', was transferred to the IJN at Kiel, commissioned as RO-501 and set sail under a Japanese crew, to rendezvous with I-8 to refuel, and proceed to Penang with precious metals, uncut optical glass, and blueprints and models for building Type IX U-boats and Messerschmitt Me 163 Komet rocket planes. She was intercepted and sunk west of the Cape Verde islands by USS Francis M. Robinson of the USS Bogue hunter-killer group on 13 May.

On 5 December 1944 U-864 sailed from Bergen, Norway to deliver parts and plans for Me 262s and 1,857 flasks containing 65 tonnes of mercury under Operation Caesar. She ran aground and had to return to Bergen, which suffered a British bombing raid on 12 January 1945 that delayed repairs. U-864 sailed again on 6 February 1945, but was detected and sunk by the British submarine HMS Venturer in the Norwegian Sea in the action of 9 February 1945, the only time one submarine was sunk by another while submerged.

In March 1945 U-234 sailed from Kristiansand for Japan with 550kg (1,210 pounds) of uranium oxide, an Me 262 jet fighter, and plans for new electric torpedoes, the last attempt to be made, but she was overtaken by the German surrender and was taken into custody by the USN off Newfoundland.
