= Japanese submarine I-55 =

Japanese submarine I-55 may refer to one of the following submarines of the Imperial Japanese Navy:

- Japanese submarine I-55 (1925), a Kaidai-type submarine; renamed I-155 in 1942; surrendered at Kure in 1945; scuttled in 1946
- Japanese submarine I-55 (1943), a Type C3 cargo submarine; sunk in 1944 by USS Gilmer and USS William C. Miller
