= Japanese submarine Ro-48 =

Kaichū-type submarine

History

Japan
- Name: Submarine No. 389
- Builder: Mitsubishi, Kobe, Japan
- Laid down: 17 March 1943
- Renamed: Ro-48 on 31 July 1943
- Launched: 15 October 1943
- Completed: 31 March 1944
- Commissioned: 31 March 1944
- Fate: Sunk 19 July 1944
- Stricken: 10 October 1944

General characteristics
- Class & type: Kaichū type submarine (K6 subclass)
- Displacement: 1,133 tonnes (1,115 long tons) surfaced; 1,470 tonnes (1,447 long tons) submerged
- Length: 80.5 m (264 ft 1 in) overall
- Beam: 7 m (23 ft 0 in)
- Draft: 4.07 m (13 ft 4 in)
- Installed power: 4,200 bhp (3,100 kW) (diesel); 1,200 hp (890 kW) (electric motor)
- Propulsion: Diesel-electric; 1 × diesel engine; 1 × electric motor
- Speed: 19.75 knots (36.58 km/h; 22.73 mph) surfaced; 8 knots (15 km/h; 9.2 mph) submerged
- Range: 5,000 nmi (9,300 km; 5,800 mi) at 16 knots (30 km/h; 18 mph) surfaced; 45 nmi (83 km; 52 mi) at 5 knots (9.3 km/h; 5.8 mph) submerged
- Test depth: 80 m (260 ft)
- Crew: 61
- Armament: 4 × bow 533 mm (21 in) torpedo tubes; 1 × 76.2 mm (3.00 in) L/40 anti-aircraft gun; 2 × single 25 mm (1.0 in) AA guns

Ro-48 was an Imperial Japanese Navy Kaichū type submarine of the K6 sub-class. Completed and commissioned in March 1944, she served in World War II and was sunk in July 1944 during her first war patrol.

== Design and description ==
The submarines of the K6 sub-class were versions of the preceding K5 sub-class with greater range and diving depth. They displaced 1,133 tonnes (1,115 long tons) surfaced and 1,470 tonnes (1,447 long tons) submerged. The submarines were 80.5 meters (264 ft 1 in) long, had a beam of 7 meters (23 ft 0 in) and a draft of 4.07 meters (13 ft 4 in). They had a diving depth of 80 meters (260 ft).

For surface running, the boats were powered by two 2,100-brake-horsepower (1,566 kW) diesel engines, each driving one propeller shaft. When submerged each propeller was driven by a 600-horsepower (447 kW) electric motor. They could reach 19.75 knots (36.58 km/h; 22.73 mph) on the surface and 8 knots (15 km/h; 9.2 mph) underwater. On the surface, the K6s had a range of 11,000 nautical miles (20,000 km; 13,000 mi) at 12 knots (22 km/h; 14 mph); submerged, they had a range of 45 nmi (83 km; 52 mi) at 5 knots (9.3 km/h; 5.8 mph).

The boats were armed with four internal bow 53.3 cm (21.0 in) torpedo tubes and carried a total of ten torpedoes. They were also armed with a single 76.2 mm (3.00 in) L/40 anti-aircraft gun and two single 25 mm (1.0 in) AA guns.

== Construction and commissioning ==
Ro-48 was laid down at Submarine No. 389 on 17 March 1943 by Mitsubishi at Kobe, Japan. She was renamed Ro-48 on 31 July 1943 and was attached provisionally to the Maizuru Naval District that day. Launched on 15 October 1943, she was completed and commissioned on 31 March 1944. She was completed with a radar detector installed and a modified conning tower designed to be less visible to radar signals.

== Service history ==
=== March–July 1944 ===
Upon commissioning, Ro-48 was attached formally to the Maizuru Naval District and assigned to Submarine Squadron 11 for workups. She was reassigned to Submarine Division 34 in the 6th Fleet on 3 July 1944.

=== First war patrol ===
On 13 June 1944 the Combined Fleet activated Operation A-Go for the defense of the Mariana Islands, and the Battle of Saipan began with U.S. landings on Saipan on 15 June 1944. On 5 July 1944, Ro-48 departed Kure, Japan, to begin her first war patrol, assigned a patrol area in the Marianas off Saipan. She arrived in her patrol area, within 200 nautical miles (370 km; 230 mi) of Saipan, on 12 July 1944, and that date received orders to stand by to rescue Imperial Japanese Navy Air Service pilots stranded on Tinian. While she was 30 nautical miles (56 km; 35 mi) north of Saipan at 21:30 Japan Standard Time on 14 July 1944, her commanding officer reported U.S. forces had forced him to submerge and that he was moving to a new position. On 16 July 1944, 6th Fleet headquarters ordered Ro-48 to return to Japan.

=== Loss ===
On 18 July 1944, a United States Navy hunter-killer group centered around the escort aircraft carrier USS Hoggatt Bay (CVE-75) was operating 300 nautical miles (560 km; 350 mi) east of Saipan when Hoggatt Bay′s radar detected an unidentified vessel on the surface at a range of 21,000 yards (19,200 m). At 00:24 on 19 July 1944, two destroyer escorts — USS Wyman (DE-38) and USS Reynolds (DE-42) — detached from the Hoggatt Bay group to investigate. Wyman held radar contact on the vessel until 00:46, when the contact disappeared at a range of 4,000 yards (3,700 m), indicating a submerging submarine. Wyman then established sonar contact on the submarine at a range of 1,600 yards (1,500 m). She fired a barrage of 24 Hedgehog projectiles at 00:51, but did not score a hit. Wyman then opened the range to reload before closing for another attack, and fired a second 24-projectile Hedgehog barrage at 01:25. Five underwater explosions that shook Wyman ensued as the Hedgehog projectiles struck the submarine and tore it apart. Wyman subsequently lost sonar contact and could not regain it, indicating destruction of the submarine at 13°01′N 151°58′E.

The submarine Wyman sank probably was Ro-48. On 10 July 1944, the Imperial Japanese Navy declared Ro-48 to be presumed lost off Saipan with all 76 men on board. She was stricken from the Navy list on 10 October 1944.

Some sources have credited the fast transport USS Gilmer (APD-11) and the destroyer escort USS William C. Miller (DE-259) with sinking Ro-48 on 14 July 1944, but the Japanese submarine they sank was probably I-55.
