= I18 =

I18 may refer to:

- HMCS Assiniboine (I18), a 1939 River-class destroyer that served in the Royal Canadian Navy
- HMS Kempenfelt (I18), a 1931 C-class destroyer of the Royal Navy
- Japanese submarine I-18, a 1939 Type C submarine of the Imperial Japanese Navy
- Västmanland Regiment (1816–1927), a Swedish Army infantry regiment
- Gotland Infantry Regiment (1928–1963), a Swedish Army infantry regiment
