= I-52-class submarine =

Cargo submarine of the Imperial Japanese Navy

Class overview
- Builders: Mitsubishi
- Operators: Imperial Japanese Navy
- Preceded by: Type C submarine
- Built: 1942–1944
- In commission: 1943–1945
- Planned: 20
- Completed: 3
- Lost: 2

General characteristics
- Displacement: 2,095 tonnes standard; 2,564 tonnes surfaced; 3,644 tonnes submerged
- Length: 356 ft 6 in (108.66 m)
- Beam: 30 ft 6 in (9.30 m)
- Draft: 16 ft 9 in (5.11 m)
- Propulsion: Diesel-electric; 2 diesels, 4,700 hp (3.5 MW) surfaced; Electric motors, 1,200 hp (895 kW) submerged
- Speed: 17.75 knots (32.87 km/h) surfaced; 6.5 knots (12 km/h) submerged
- Range: 21,000 nmi (39,000 km) at 16 kn (30 km/h)
- Test depth: 100 m (330 ft)
- Complement: 94 officers and men
- Armament: 2 × 140 mm (5.5 in)/40 calibre deck gun; 6 × 533 mm (21 in) torpedo tubes (bow); 19 × Type 95 torpedoes

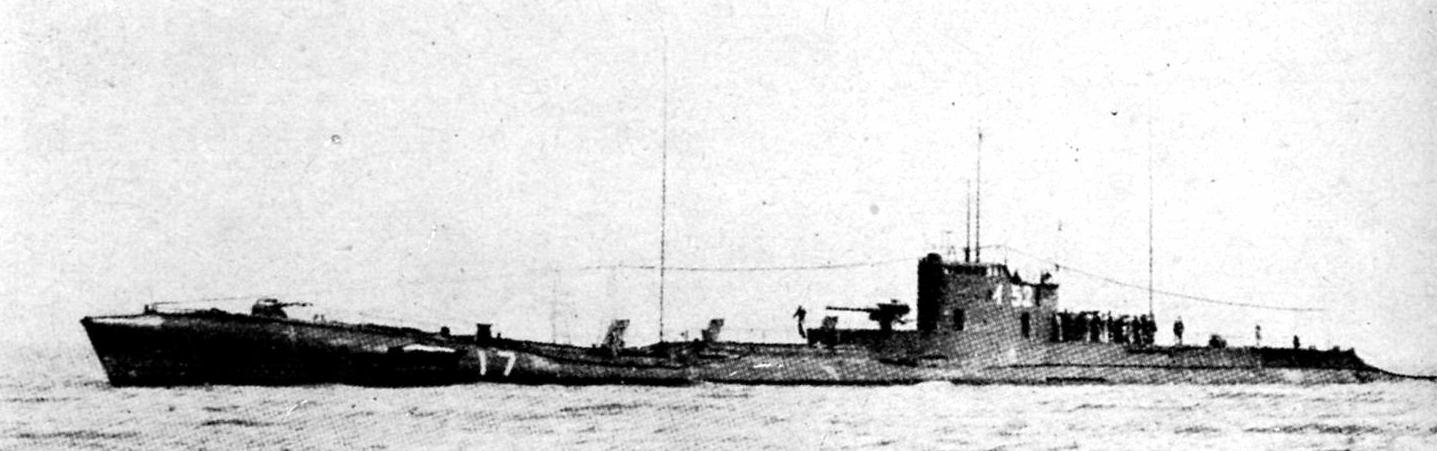
A photo of an I-52 submarine, taken from a book by The Navy Association of Japan

The Cruiser submarines Type C modified (巡潜丙型改潜水艦, Junsen Hei-gata kai sensuikan) (Type C2), also called I-52-class submarine (伊五十二型潜水艦, I-go-jū-ni-gata sensuikan) were operated by the Imperial Japanese Navy, designed and built by Mitsubishi Corporation, between 1943 and 1944, as cargo carriers.

The Japanese constructed only three of these during World War II, although twenty were planned.

- I-52 was laid down on 18 March 1942, and she was commissioned on 28 December 1943 into the 11th Submarine Squadron. After training in Japan she was selected for a Yanagi (exchange) mission to Germany. She was sunk on 24 June 1944 by aircraft from USS Bogue (CVE-9) 800 mi (1,300 km) southwest of the Azores. Her cargo consisted of rubber, gold, quinine, and Japanese engineers to Germany.
- I-53 survived the war, but she was scuttled by the US Navy off the Gotō Islands in 1946.
- I-55 was sunk after three months in commission by destroyer USS Gilmer and destroyer escort USS William C. Miller off Saipan on 14 July 1944.

== See also ==
- Cruiser submarine
