= Japanese submarine I-55 (1943) =

Type C cruiser submarine

History

Empire of Japan
- Name: Submarine No. 628
- Builder: Kure Navy Yard, Kure, Hiroshima
- Laid down: 15 June 1942
- Renamed: I-55 on 1 November 1942
- Launched: 20 April 1943
- Completed: 20 April 1944
- Commissioned: 20 April 1944
- Fate: Missing after 13 July 1944 (see text)
- Stricken: 10 October 1944

General characteristics
- Class & type: Type C2 submarine
- Displacement: 2,605 tonnes (2,564 long tons) surfaced; 3,702 tonnes (3,644 long tons) submerged
- Length: 108.7 m (356 ft 8 in) overall
- Beam: 9.3 m (30 ft 6 in)
- Draft: 5.1 m (16 ft 9 in)
- Installed power: 4,700 bhp (3,500 kW) (diesel); 1,200 hp (890 kW) (electric motor)
- Propulsion: Diesel-electric; 1 × diesel engine; 1 × electric motor
- Speed: 17.7 knots (32.8 km/h; 20.4 mph) surfaced; 6.5 knots (12.0 km/h; 7.5 mph) submerged
- Range: 27,000 nmi (50,000 km; 31,000 mi) at 12 knots (22 km/h; 14 mph) surfaced; 105 nmi (194 km; 121 mi) at 3 knots (5.6 km/h; 3.5 mph) submerged
- Test depth: 100 m (330 ft)
- Crew: 94
- Armament: 6 × bow 533 mm (21 in) torpedo tubes; 2 × 14 cm (5.5 in) deck gun; 1 × twin 25 mm (1 in) Type 96 anti-aircraft guns

The second I-55 was one of three Type C cruiser submarines of the C2 sub-class built for the Imperial Japanese Navy. Commissioned in April 1944, she was lost in July 1944 while taking part in the Marianas campaign during World War II.

== Design and description ==
The Type C2 submarines were derived from the earlier C1 sub-class although with fewer torpedo tubes, an additional deck gun, and less-powerful engines to extend their range. They displaced 2,605 tonnes (2,564 long tons) surfaced and 3,702 tonnes (3,644 long tons) submerged. The submarines were 108.7 meters (356 ft 8 in) long, had a beam of 9.3 meters (30 ft 6 in) and a draft of 5.1 meters (16 ft 9 in). They had a diving depth of 100 meters (330 ft).

For surface running, the boats were powered by two 2,350-brake-horsepower (1,752 kW) diesel engines, each driving one propeller shaft. When submerged each propeller was driven by a 600-horsepower (447 kW) electric motor. They could reach 17.7 knots (32.8 km/h; 20.4 mph) on the surface and 6.5 knots (12.0 km/h; 7.5 mph) underwater. On the surface, the C2s had a range of 27,000 nautical miles (50,000 km; 31,000 mi) at 12 knots (22 km/h; 14 mph); submerged, they had a range of 105 nmi (194 km; 121 mi) at 3 knots (5.6 km/h; 3.5 mph).

The boats were armed with six internal bow 53.3 cm (21.0 in) torpedo tubes and carried a total of 19 torpedoes. They were also armed with two 140 mm (5.5 in)/40 deck guns and one twin mount for 25 mm (1 in) Type 96 anti-aircraft guns.

== Construction and commissioning ==
Ordered under the Additional Naval Armaments Supplement Programme and built at the Kure Naval Arsenal at Kure, Japan, I-55 was laid down on 15 June 1942 with the name Submarine No. 628. On 1 November 1942, she was provisionally attached to the Kure Naval District and numbered I-55; she was the second Japanese submarine of that number, the first I-55 having been renumbered I-155 on 20 May 1942. Launched on 20 April 1943, she was completed and commissioned one year later, on 20 April 1944.

== Service history ==
Upon commissioning, I-55 was based in the Kure Naval District and assigned to Submarine Squadron 11 in the 6th Fleet. In late June 1944, she was selected for conversion to carry Special Naval Weapon No. 8, a version of the Fu-Go balloon bomb that could be launched at sea, the conversion involving the installation of hydrogen and balloon-launching equipment. Meanwhile, however, the Combined Fleet had activated Operation A-Go for the defense of the Mariana Islands on 13 June 1944, and the Marianas campaign had begun with the U.S. invasion of Saipan on 15 June. Before her conversion could begin, I-55 got underway from Kure on 30 June 1944, called at Yokosuka from 1 to 6 July 1944, and then departed for Guam towing an Unpoto gun container, a 70-foot (21.3 m) sled that could carry up to 15 tons of cargo, usually in the form of three Type 96 15-centimeter (5.9 in) howitzers and ammunition for them.

While she was at sea on 10 July 1944, I-55 was reassigned to Submarine Division 15 in the Advance Force, and on 13 July she received orders to abort her supply mission to Guam and proceed to Tinian to rescue the staff of the 1st Air Fleet there. She cast the Unpoto container adrift and headed for Tinian. At 00:40 Japan Standard Time on 13 July, she transmitted a message to 6th Fleet Headquarters estimating that she would arrive off Tinian on 15 July. The Japanese never heard from her again.

At 21:20 on 13 July 1944, an American patrol plane spotted a Japanese submarine submerging in the Philippine Sea 78 nautical miles (144 km; 90 mi) off Saipan′s Rorogattan Point. The submarine′s position was reported to a United States Navy hunter-killer group, which detached the high-speed transport USS Gilmer (APD-11) and destroyer escort USS William C. Miller (DE-259) to hunt it down. The two ships arrived at the submarine′s last reported position at 00:22 on 14 July 1944 and began their search. Seven hours later, William C. Miller picked up a sound contact at a range of 1,700 yards (1,600 m) and approached the contact at 15 knots (28 km/h; 17 mph). She began her attack at 07:26 by dropping a pattern of 13 depth charges, followed by a second pattern of 13 depth charges at 07:52. At 0804, her crew observed pieces of wood rising to the surface about 500 yards (460 m) ahead on William C. Miller′s starboard bow, then heard a heavy underwater explosion at 08:05 that shook the ship, followed by bubbles rising to the surface that made the water appear to boil. William C. Miller dropped a third pattern of 13 depth charges at 0806, sinking the submarine. An oil slick and debris covered the surface, and William C. Miller steamed into the slick and recovered pieces of cork insulating material, splintered wooden decking, and a seaman's cap at 15°18′N 144°26′E.

It remains a matter of dispute as to whether William C. Miller sank I-55 or the submarine Ro-48. The destroyer escorts USS Wyman (DE-38) and USS Reynolds (DE-42) also have received credit for sinking I-55 in an antisubmarine action on 28 July 1944.

On 15 July 1944, the Imperial Japanese Navy declared I-55 to be presumed lost with all 112 hands off Tinian. She was stricken from the Navy list on 10 October 1944.
