= Japanese submarine I-20 =

Type C cruiser submarine

History

Empire of Japan
- Name: Submarine No. 46
- Builder: Mitsubishi Kobe Yard, Kobe
- Laid down: 16 November 1937
- Renamed: I-20
- Launched: 25 January 1939
- Completed: 26 September 1940
- Commissioned: 26 September 1940
- Fate: Missing after 31 August 1943
- Stricken: 1 December 1943

General characteristics
- Class & type: Type C submarine
- Displacement: 2,595 tonnes (2,554 long tons) surfaced; 3,618 tonnes (3,561 long tons) submerged
- Length: 109.3 m (358 ft 7 in) overall
- Beam: 9.1 m (29 ft 10 in)
- Draft: 5.3 m (17 ft 5 in)
- Installed power: 12,400 bhp (9,200 kW) (diesel); 2,000 hp (1,500 kW) (electric motor)
- Propulsion: Diesel-electric; 1 × diesel engine; 1 × electric motor
- Speed: 23.5 knots (43.5 km/h; 27.0 mph) surfaced; 8 knots (15 km/h; 9.2 mph) submerged
- Range: 14,000 nmi (26,000 km; 16,000 mi) at 16 knots (30 km/h; 18 mph) surfaced; 60 nmi (110 km; 69 mi) at 3 knots (5.6 km/h; 3.5 mph) submerged
- Test depth: 100 m (330 ft)
- Crew: 95
- Armament: 8 × bow 533 mm (21 in) torpedo tubes; 1 × 14 cm (5.5 in) deck gun; 2 × single or twin 25 mm (1 in) Type 96 anti-aircraft guns
- Notes: Fitted to carry 1 × Type A midget submarine

I-20 (伊20) was the third Type C cruiser submarines built for the Imperial Japanese Navy. During World War II, she operated as the mother ship for a midget submarine during the attack on Pearl Harbor and the attack of Diego-Suarez, conducted war patrols in the Pacific Ocean and Indian Ocean, and served in the Guadalcanal campaign and New Guinea campaign. She was last heard from on 31 August 1943.

== Design and description ==
The Type C submarines were derived from the earlier Kaidai-type VI with a heavier torpedo armament for long-range attacks. They displaced 2,595 tonnes (2,554 long tons) surfaced and 3,618 tonnes (3,561 long tons) submerged. The submarines were 109.3 meters (358 ft 7 in) long, had a beam of 9.1 meters (29 ft 10 in) and a draft of 5.3 meters (17 ft 5 in). They had a diving depth of 100 meters (330 ft).

For surface running, the boats were powered by two 6,200-brake-horsepower (4,623 kW) diesel engines, each driving one propeller shaft. When submerged each propeller was driven by a 1,000-horsepower (746 kW) electric motor. They could reach 23.6 knots (43.7 km/h; 27.2 mph) on the surface and 8 knots (15 km/h; 9.2 mph) underwater. On the surface, the C1s had a range of 14,000 nautical miles (26,000 km; 16,000 mi) at 16 knots (30 km/h; 18 mph); submerged, they had a range of 60 nmi (110 km; 69 mi) at 3 knots (5.6 km/h; 3.5 mph).

The boats were armed with eight internal bow 53.3 cm (21.0 in) torpedo tubes and carried a total of 20 torpedoes. They were also armed with a single 140 mm (5.5 in)/40 deck gun and two single or twin mounts for 25 mm (1 in) Type 96 anti-aircraft guns. They were equipped to carry one Type A midget submarine aft of the conning tower.

== Construction and commissioning ==
Ordered under the 3rd Naval Armaments Supplement Programme and built by Mitsubishi at Kobe, Japan, I-20 was laid down on 16 November 1937 with the name Submarine No. 46. Renamed I-20 by the time she was launched on 25 January 1939, she was completed and commissioned on 26 September 1940.

== Service history ==
=== Pre-World War II ===
Upon commissioning, I-20 was attached to the Yokosuka Naval District. During the autumn of 1940, she took part in Japanese tests of the German-made Atlas Werke Periphon A passive sonar. She was assigned to Submarine Division 2 in Submarine Squadron 1 in the 6th Fleet along with the submarines I-18 and I-19. In the autumn of 1941, she underwent conversion into a mother ship for a Type A midget submarine. The submarines I-16, I-18, I-22, and I-24 also underwent the conversion.

At the Kure Navy Club in Kure, Japan, on 17 November 1941, the commander of Submarine Division 3 briefed the commanding officers of the five converted submarines on the upcoming attack on Pearl Harbor and on the role of their submarines in it. He had been designated the commander of the Special Attack Unit, made up of all five submarines, each of which was to launch a Type A midget submarine off Pearl Harbor so that the midget submarines could participate in the attack. I-22 was to serve as flagship of the Special Attack unit.

On 18 November 1941, the five submarines moved from Kure to the Kamegakubi Naval Proving Ground, where each embarked a Type A midget submarine. At 02:15 on 19 November 1941, the five submarines got underway from Kamegakubi bound for the Hawaiian Islands, taking a direct route that took them south of Midway Atoll. While at sea, they received the message "Climb Mount Niitaka 1208" (Japanese: Niitakayama nobore 1208) from the Combined Fleet on 2 December 1941, indicating that war with the Allies would commence on 8 December 1941 Japan time, which was on 7 December 1941 on the other side of the International Date Line in Hawaii.

=== World War II ===
==== Pearl Harbor ====
At 02:57 on 7 December 1941, I-20 launched her midget submarine, No. 17, south of Oahu 5.3 nautical miles (9.8 km; 6.1 mi) from the entrance to Pearl Harbor. After the United States Navy coastal minesweeper USS Condor reported an unidentified submarine in a submarine exclusion zone off Pearl Harbor, the destroyer USS Ward began a search for the submarine at 04:08, finding nothing. At 06:30, however, Ward sighted No. 17′s conning tower in the wake of the general stores ship USS Antares, which was approaching the harbor′s outer gate with a target barge in tow. A PBY Catalina flying boat of Patrol Squadron 14 (VP-14) dropped smoke markers to indicate the midget submarine′s position. Ward opened gunfire on the submarine at 06:45 at a range of only 100 yards (91 m), firing the first shot of World War II by the American armed forces. She closed the range to 50 yards (46 m) and hit No. 17′s conning tower with a 4-inch (102 mm) shell. Ward steamed past the midget submarine and dropped four depth charges as it wallowed in her wake, and the PBY then dropped more depth charges. No. 17 sank outside the harbor′s entrance with the loss of her two-man crew. On 28 August 2002, the Hawaii Undersea Research Laboratory deep submergence vehicles Pisces IV and Pisces V found a midget submarine resting almost upright on the bottom in 1,200 feet (366 m) of water 3 to 4 nautical miles (5.6 to 7.4 km; 3.5 to 4.6 mi) off the entrance to Pearl Harbor, prompting speculation among historians and maritime archaeologists that it was I-20′s midget.

I-20 and the other four "mother" submarines proceeded to the planned recovery area for their midget submarines west of Lanai, where they spent the night of 7–8 December 1941. None of the midget submarines returned. Early on 9 December 1941, I-18, I-20, and I-24 received orders to leave the recovery area. I-20 departed the Hawaiian Islands on 12 December 1941 and arrived at Kwajalein with I-16 on 22 December 1941.

==== First war patrol ====
On 4 January 1942, I-20 departed Kwajalein to begin her first war patrol, assigned a patrol area in the vicinity of Fiji and the Samoan Islands. She surfaced 15,000 yards (13,700 m) off the harbor at Pago-Pago on Tutuila in American Samoa before dawn on 11 January 1942 and fired twelve 140-millimeter (5.5 in) rounds from her deck gun at the naval station. Most of her shells missed, and the only casualties were a United States Marine Corps officer and a Samoan Marine Reserve Battalion member who suffered wounds.

Moving to Fijian waters, I-20 attacked the Royal New Zealand Navy armed merchant cruiser HMNZS Monowai on 16 January 1942 just after Monowai departed the harbor at Suva. Her torpedoes exploded prematurely at 16:03. Believing that she was attacking a merchant ship, I-20 surfaced 7,400 yards (6,800 m) from Monowai at 16:08 to attack her with gunfire. Monowai opened a heavy volume of fire with her portside 6-inch (152 mm) guns. I-20 traded fire with Monowai, claiming a hit on Monowai′s bridge, but submerged at 16:14 after Monowai straddled her. Neither vessel suffered damage, and Monowai transmitted a submarine contact signal and steamed out of the area at high speed. I-20 returned to Kwajalein on 24 January 1942, then proceeded to Japan, where she arrived at Yokosuka on 1 February 1942.

==== February–April 1942 ====
During I-20′s stay in Japan, the German naval staff in Berlin formally requested on 27 March 1942 that Japan begin attacks on Allied convoys in the Indian Ocean. On 8 April 1942, the Japanese formally agreed to meet this request by dispatching submarines to operate off the coast of East Africa, and that day they withdrew Submarine Division 1 of Submarine Squadron 8 from its base at Kwajalein to Japan. By 16 April 1942 they had created the "A" detachment within Submarine Squadron 8, consisting of I-20 and the submarines I-10, I-16, I-18, and I-30, as well as midget submarines and the auxiliary cruisers Aikoku Maru and Hōkoku Maru, which were to operate as supply ships for the submarines. That morning, the commander of the 6th Fleet, Vice Admiral Teruhisa Komatsu, the commander of Submarine Squadron 8, their staffs, and the midget submarine crews paid a courtesy call on the commander-in-chief of the Combined Fleet, Admiral Isoroku Yamamoto, aboard his flagship, the battleship Yamato, at Hashirajima anchorage. After the visit with Yamamoto, the detachment got underway at 11:00, bound for Penang in Japanese-occupied British Malaya.

During the detachment′s voyage, 16 United States Army Air Forces B-25 Mitchell bombers launched by the aircraft carrier USS Hornet struck targets on Honshu in the Doolittle Raid on 18 April 1942. The detachment received orders from the 6th Fleet that day to divert from its voyage and head northeast, passing north of the Bonin Islands, to intercept the U.S. Navy task force that had launched the strike. The detachment failed to find the U.S. ships and soon resumed its voyage.

I-30 and Aikoku Maru called at Penang from 20 April to 22 April 1942 before heading into the Indian Ocean to conduct an advance reconnaissance of the "A" Detachment′s planned operating area. The rest of the "A" Detachment reached Penang on 27 April 1942, where the seaplane carrier Nisshin — which had undergone modifications allowing her to carry Type A midget submarines — rendezvoused with it. I-16, I-18, and I-20 each embarked a midget submarine at Penang.

==== Indian Ocean operation ====
I-20 and the other "A" detachment units got underway from Penang on 30 April 1942, headed westward into the Indian Ocean with I-10 serving as the detachment′s flagship. The submarines refueled at sea from Aikoku Maru and Hōkoku Maru on 5, 10, and 15 May 1942. I-20 suffered a mishap on 17 May when seawater entered through her main induction valve and flooded her engine room in heavy seas. Her crew repaired the damage, only to have the engine room flood a second time, necessitating further repairs.

I-10′s Yokosuka E14Y1 (Allied reporting name "Glen") floatplane began reconnaissance flights over ports in South Africa by reconnoitering Durban on 20 May 1942, followed by flights over East London, Port Elizabeth, and Simon's Town over the next week, and by 24 May the "A" detachment submarines were encountering heavy Allied shipping traffic as they approached East Africa. On the night of 29 May, I-10′s floatplane flew over Diego-Suarez, Madagascar, sighting the British battleship HMS Ramillies among the ships anchored there. The "A" detachment commander selected Diego-Suarez as the target for a midget submarine attack, scheduled for 30 May 1942.

On 30 May 1942, I-18′s midget submarine suffered engine failure and could not launch, but I-16 and I-20 launched their midget submarines 10 nautical miles (19 km; 12 mi) off Diego-Suarez. I-20′s midget torpedoed Ramillies at 20:25. At 21:20, while British corvettes dropped depth charges, I-20′s midget torpedoed and sank the 6,993-ton tanker British Loyalty in shallow water. After the midget ran aground, its two-man crew reached shore and attempted to make their way overland to the designated recovery area, but they were reported to the British as having been seen outside Anjiabe at around 11:00 on 1 June and died in a gunfight with Royal Marine Commando No. 5 on 2 June 1942 at Amponkarana Bay (12°00′S 049°12′E). One Royal Marine also died in the exchange of gunfire. Ramillies survived the attack and departed for Durban ten days later, although the Japanese assessed her as sunk after I-10′s floatplane noted her missing from Diego-Saurez during a reconnaissance flight. British Loyalty later was refloated, towed to Addu Atoll, and scuttled.

On 3 June 1942, after I-16 and I-18 had departed the recovery area, I-20 arrived and made an unsuccessful attempt to contact the midget submarines and their crews. She then joined the rest of the "A" detachment in anti-shipping operations. She torpedoed and sank the Panamanian 5,086-ton armed merchant ship Johnstown at 13°12′S 042°06′E on 5 June, the Greek 5,209-ton merchant ship Christos Markettos at 05°05′S 040°53′E on 8 June, and the British 7,926-ton armed merchant ship Mahronda at 14°37′S 040°58′E on 11 June 1942. On 12 June, she sank the Panamanian 2,052-ton merchant ship Hellenic Trader at 14°40′S 040°53′E with gunfire and torpedoed and sank the British 5,063-ton merchant ship Clifton Hall at 16°25′S 040°10′E.

After refueling from Aikoku Maru on 19 June 1942, I-20 torpedoed the Norwegian 5,063-ton armed merchant ship Goviken, which was on a voyage from Aden to Lourenço Marques in Portuguese East Africa, on 29 June 1942. Goviken sank less than 20 minutes later at 13°25′S 041°53′E. On 30 June, I-20 attacked the British 5,311-ton armed steam tanker Steaua Romana with gunfire at 09°S 042°E. She fired fifteen 140-millimeter (5.5 in) rounds and scored one hit. After Steaua Romana returned fire, I-20 submerged and fired a torpedo, but it exploded prematurely. Steaua Romana dropped a smoke float in attempt to conceal herself and tried to escape, but I-20 fired a second torpedo which sank her. That evening, I-20 was able to identify her victim as Steaua Romana by intercepting Allied radio communications.

Concerned by a number of premature detonations of I-20′s torpedoes, her commanding officer ordered her crew to disassemble and examine a Type 95 torpedo on 5 July 1942. On 21 July, she moved into the Gulf of Aden before departing her patrol area and proceeding to Penang, which she reached on 5 August 1942. She later set course for Japan, arriving at Yokosuka on 23 August 1942 to undergo an overhaul.

==== Guadalcanal campaign ====
Meanwhile, the Guadalcanal campaign had begun on 7 August 1942 with U.S. amphibious landings on Guadalcanal, Tulagi, Florida Island, Gavutu, and Tanambogo in the southeastern Solomon Islands. With her overhaul complete, I-20 got underway from Yokosuka on 24 October 1942 to take part in the fighting in the Solomons. On 2 November 1942, I-16, I-20, and I-24 formed an attack group and each received orders to load a midget submarine delivered by the seaplane tender Chiyoda at an anchorage off Shortland Island in the Shortland Islands, then proceed to the Indispensable Strait. I-20 loaded her midget submarine, No. 11, on 5 November. She launched No. 11 4 nautical miles (7.4 km; 4.6 mi) north of Cape Esperance on Guadalcanal′s northern coast at 05:20 on 7 November 1942. No. 11 hit the anchored U.S. Navy 2,227-ton miscellaneous auxiliary USS Majaba, with a Type 97 torpedo, inflicting enough damage that Majaba had to beach herself on Guadalcanal to avoid sinking, although she later was salvaged. The destroyers USS Landsdowne and USS Lardner counterattacked with depth charges, but No. 11 escaped unscathed. No. 11′s crew scuttled her and swam safely to Guadalcanal, and I-20 proceeded to Truk.

At Truk, I-20 embarked the midget submarine No. 37 and departed on 13 November 1942. She arrived at her launch area off Lungga Point on the northern coast of Guadalcanal on 18 November, and launched No. 37 6 nautical miles (11 km; 6.9 mi) off Cape Esperance at 03:00 on 19 November 1942. At 03:02, No. 37 developed a serious oil leak from her steering system, but she pressed ahead on the surface. Sighting no targets off Guadalcanal, her two-man crew scuttled her off Cape Esperance at 09:55 and swam safely to shore on Guadalcanal.

At Truk, I-20 embarked the midget submarine No. 8 and departed on 26 November 1942. She arrived at her launch area off Lungga Point on 1 December 1942. She launched No. 8 19 nautical miles (35 km; 22 mi) off Savo Island on 2 December. On 3 December, No. 8 sighted several targets, including transports and destroyers, off Guadalcanal. She ran aground but freed herself, then fired both of her torpedoes at a transport, subsequently hearing an explosion. A destroyer pursued No. 8. She escaped without damage, but was swamped when she surfaced, so her two-man crew scuttled her and swam safely to Guadalcanal.

While I-20 was conducting her midget-submarine operations, the Japanese issued orders on 16 November 1942 for their submarines to begin a series of supply runs to deliver cargo to the Japanese forces fighting on Guadalcanal. Assigned to these duties, I-20 arrived off Cape Esperance on 31 December 1942, delivering 25-tons of cargo in rubber containers. She made a brief stop at Truk before departing on 2 January 1943 for Shortland Island. Getting underway from Shortland for her second supply run, she arrived off Cape Esperance on 7 January 1943, discharging 18-tons of cargo in rubber containers. On her third and final Guadalcanal supply run, she became the first Japanese submarine to deliver cargo using an Unkato supply container — a 135-foot (41.1 m) submersible cargo container that could carry up to 377 tons of supplies, designed for a one-way trip in which the cargo′s recipients released, recovered, and unloaded it — departing Shortland on 20 January and delivering 18 tons of cargo at Cape Esperance in her container on 22 January 1943.

==== New Guinea campaign ====
After the conclusion of the Guadalcanal campaign in early February 1943, I-20 received orders to begin supply runs to New Guinea, where Japanese forces were fighting in the New Guinea campaign. Departing Truk on 18 March 1943, she delivered 30 tons of food and ammunition at Lae on the coast of New Guinea on 21 March. She called at Lae again to deliver cargo on 27 March 1943. During her third supply run, she collided underwater with her sister ship I-16 south of New Britain on 2 April 1943, but suffered only minor damage and continued to Lae, which she reached on 3 April. She unloaded 37 tons of cargo there and evacuated 39 men, including Imperial Japanese Army Lieutenant General Hatazō Adachi and his staff. She next called at Lae on 9 April 1943, dropping off 30 tons of cargo and embarking 42 soldiers.

On 11 April 1943, the submarine I-5, also making a supply run to Lae, was on the surface in the Solomon Sea 90 nautical miles (170 km; 100 mi) east of Gasmata, New Britain, when she sighted I-20 on the surface at 05:10. Sighting I-5 at 05:13 and mistaking her for an Allied submarine, I-20 began an attack approach. I-5, which had identified I-20 as a Japanese submarine, managed to break contact with I-20, which had never realized during the encounter that I-5 was Japanese.

I-5, I-6, I-16, and I-20 were attached temporarily to the headquarters of the 8th Fleet on 13 April 1942. I-20 delivered 37 tons of cargo at Lae on 15 April 1943 and embarked 42 soldiers. An Allied bomber illuminated her with flares off Lae, but she avoided an attack.

I-20′s next supply run was to Kolombangara in the New Georgia Islands, where she delivered food and ammunition on 20 April 1943. She then returned to her Lae runs, calling there on 2 May 1943 to deliver 39 tons of cargo and evacuate 31 soldiers and on 8 May to deliver another 39 tons of cargo on her seventh and final supply run to Lae. Re-attached to 8th Fleet headquarters on 15 May 1943, she proceeded to Japan, where she arrived on 20 May at Yokosuka for an overhaul.

==== Second war patrol ====
With her overhaul complete and reassigned to Submarine Squadron 1, I-20 departed Yokosuka on 4 August 1943 and stopped at Truk from 10 to 19 August before getting back underway to conduct her second war patrol, assigned a patrol area in the New Hebrides. On 30 August 1943, she reported sighting an Allied force including an aircraft carrier and two battleships off Espiritu Santo. On 31 August, she reported that she had torpedoed and damaged the American 10,872-ton tanker W. S. Rheem at 15°51′S 167°02′E. She was never heard from again.

==== Loss ====
The exact circumstances of I-20′s loss remain unknown. I-20 and the submarine I-182 both were patrolling in the vicinity of the New Hebrides at the time, and neither returned. U.S. Navy forces reported two successful antisubmarine attacks off Espiritu Santo in early September 1943.

The first action took place on 1 September 1943, when the destroyer USS Wadsworth, operating as part of a hunter-killer group, began a search for a reported Japanese submarine off Espiritu Santo at 10:55. After searching on a north-south axis, she picked up a strong sonar contact at 13:00, and dropped a pattern of ten depth charges set to explode at an average depth of 150 feet (46 m). The attack produced no signs of success, so Wadsworth commenced a second attack, with her depth charges set for an average of 250 feet (76 m). The submarine turned to port just before Wadsworth launched the depth charges, then headed south before turning northeast, creating an underwater wake that degraded Wadsworth′s sonar detection capability. Wadsworth made several attack runs without dropping depth charges before firing a deep pattern set to explode at an average depth of 425 feet (130 m). This resulted in a very large air bubble rising to the surface, but no other sign of a submarine in distress. Wadsworth continued to pursue the submarine, which maneuvered to create more underwater turbulence in an attempt to defeat Wadsworth′s sonar. Wadsworth dropped a final pattern of ten depth charges set to explode at an average depth of 250 feet (76 m), then turned east and opened the range. A PBY Catalina flying boat reported debris and a 400-by-600-yard (370 by 550 m) oil slick that smelled like diesel fuel on the surface just south of the location of Wadsworth′s final attack. Wooden debris also was sighted on the surface at 15°38′S 166°57′E.

The second action occurred on 3 September 1943, when the destroyer USS Ellet conducted a sweep for a reported Japanese submarine off Espiritu Santo. Ellet picked up a radar contact at a range of 13,000 yards (11,900 m) at 19:35, closed to a range of about 5,000 yards (4,600 m), and challenged the unseen contact with a visual signal. After Ellet received no reply, she illuminated the area with star shells. The target disappeared from radar at a range of 3,400 yards (3,100 m), but Ellet then picked up a sonar contact at a range of 3,000 yards (2,700 m). Between 20:12 and 20:38 Ellet conducted a series of depth charge attacks. She lost sonar contact at 20:59, and at dawn on 4 September 1943 a large oil slick and debris were sighted on the surface at 13°10′S 165°28′E.

The submarines Wadsworth and Ellet sank remain unidentified. It seems likely that one of them was I-20 and the other I-182.

On 18 November 1943, the Imperial Japanese Navy declared I-20 lost with her entire crew of 101 men off Espiritu Santo. She was stricken from the Navy list on 1 December 1943.

== Summery of raiding history ==
Date	Ship name	Classification	Tonnage	Nationality	Fate
30 May 1942	HMS Ramillies	Battleship	31,630	Britain	Damaged by midget submarine
30 May 1942	British Loyalty	Tanker	6,993	Britain	Sunk by midget submarine
5 June 1942	Johnstown	Armed merchant ship	5,086	Panama	Sunk
8 June 1942	Christos Markettos	Merchant ship	5,209	Greece	Sunk
11 June 1942	Mahronda	Armed merchant ship	7,926	Britain	Sunk
12 June 1942	Hellenic Trader	Merchant ship	2,052	Panama	Sunk
12 June 1942	Clifton Hall	Merchant ship	5,063	Britain	Sunk
29 June 1942	Goviken	Armed merchant ship	5,063	Norway	Sunk
30 June 1942	Steaua Romana	Tanker	5,311	Britain	Sunk
7 November 1942	USS Majaba	Miscellaneous auxiliary	2,254	USA	Destroyed by midget submarine
3 September 1943	W. S. Rheem	Tanker	10,872	USA	Damaged
