= USS Lake =

United States Navy ship

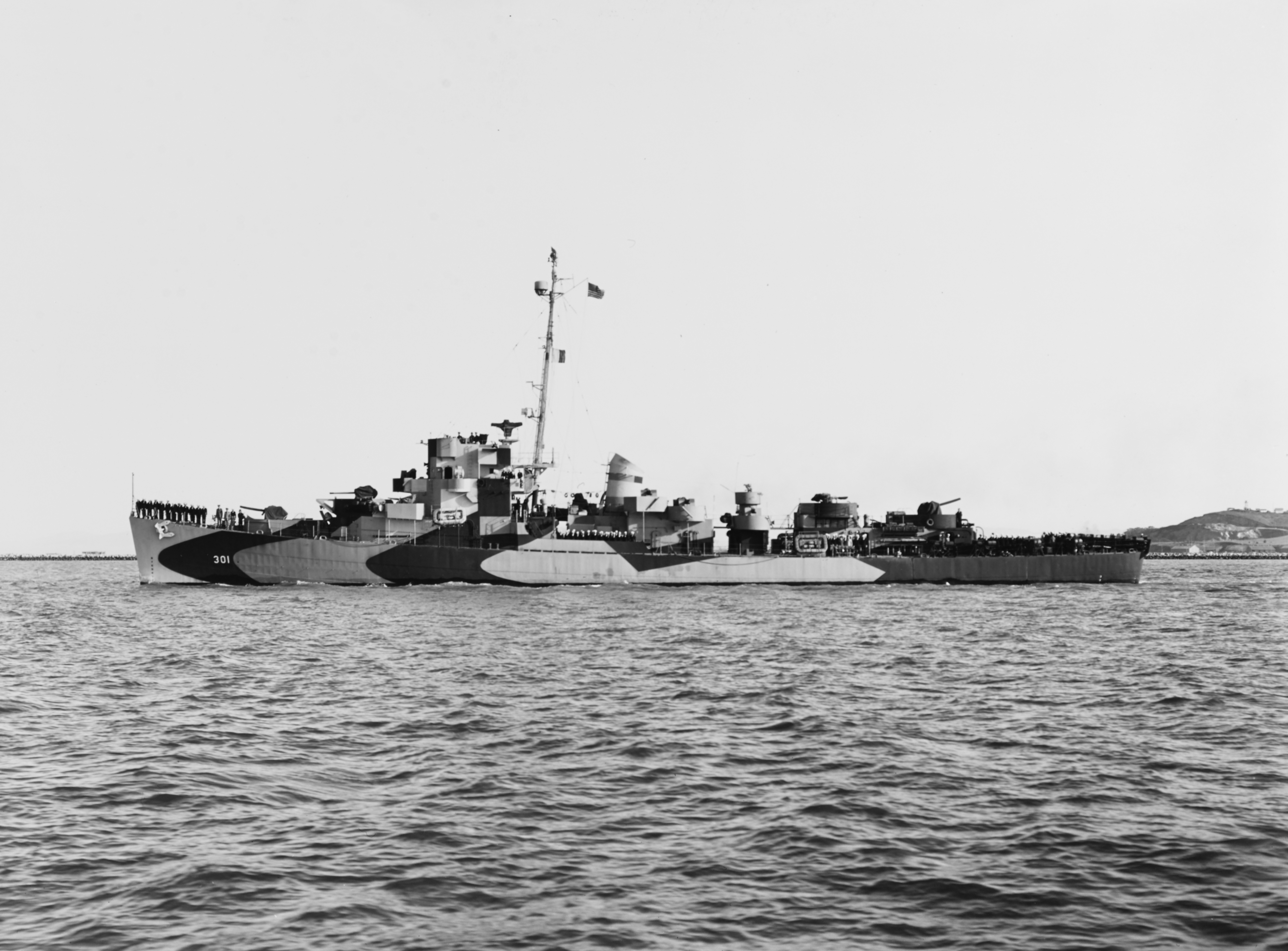
- Lake on 7 April 1944

History

United States
- Name: USS Lake
- Builder: Mare Island Navy Yard
- Laid down: 22 April 1943
- Launched: 18 August 1943
- Commissioned: 5 February 1944
- Decommissioned: 3 December 1945
- Stricken: 19 December 1945
- Honors and awards: 2 battle stars (World War II)
- Fate: Sold for scrapping, 14 December 1946

General characteristics
- Type: Evarts-class destroyer escort
- Displacement: 1,140 long tons (1,158 t) standard; 1,430 long tons (1,453 t) full
- Length: 289 ft 5 in (88.21 m) o/a; 283 ft 6 in (86.41 m) w/l
- Beam: 35 ft 2 in (10.72 m)
- Draft: 11 ft (3.4 m) (max)
- Propulsion: 4 × General Motors Model 16-278A diesel engines with electric drive, 6,000 shp (4,474 kW); 2 screws
- Speed: 19 knots (35 km/h; 22 mph)
- Range: 4,150 nmi (7,690 km)
- Complement: 15 officers and 183 enlisted
- Armament: 3 × single 3"/50 Mk.22 dual-purpose guns; 1 × quad 1.1"/75 Mk.2 AA gun; 9 × 20 mm Mk.4 AA guns; 1 × Hedgehog Projector Mk.10 (144 rounds); 8 × Mk.6 depth charge projectors; 2 × Mk.9 depth charge tracks

USS Lake (DE-301) was an Evarts-class destroyer escort of the United States Navy during World War II. She was sent off into the Pacific Ocean to protect convoys and other ships from Japanese submarines and fighter aircraft. She performed escort and antisubmarine operations in dangerous battle areas and returned home with two battle stars.

== Design ==
The Evarts-class destroyer escorts were 289 ft 5 in (88.21 m) long overall, and they had a beam of 35 ft 2 in (10.72 m). They had an average draft of 10 ft 1 in (3.07 m) at their full load displacement of 1,416 long tons (1,439 t). Each ship had a normal crew numbered 156 officers and sailors.

Lake was propelled by a pair of diesel motors manufactured by General Motors, which drove a pair of screw propellers. Her propulsion system was rated to produce 6,000 brake horsepower (4,500 kW) for a top speed of 19.5 knots (36.1 km/h; 22.4 mph). Oil storage amounted to between 131 and 197 long tons (133 and 200 t), which allowed a cruising radius of up to 6,000 nautical miles (11,000 km; 6,900 mi) at an economical pace of 10 knots (19 km/h; 12 mph).

The ship's armament consisted of a main battery of three 3-inch (76 mm) /50-caliber guns in individual pivot mounts, which could be used against air or surface targets. These were supported by a light anti-aircraft battery that initially consisted of four 1.1 in (28 mm) /75-caliber guns in a quadruple mount and nine 20 mm (0.79 in) Oerlikon guns. For attacks against submarines, the ship was equipped with a Hedgehog mortar, eight depth charge throwers, and two depth charge racks.

== Service history ==
Lake was laid down on 22 April 1943 by Mare Island Navy Yard, Vallejo, California. The ship was named for John Lake, a sailor killed aboard USS Arizona during the attack on Pearl Harbor. The ship was launched on 18 August 1943; sponsored by Mrs. Carol M. Feldman; and commissioned on 5 February 1944.

Lake sailed from San Francisco, California, on 11 April 1944 escorting to a convoy to Hawaii and arriving on 20 April. She operated there until sailing on 23 June to escort a convoy to the Marshall Islands. Lake sortied on 5 July from Eniwetok with a hunter-killer group for anti-submarine patrols off the Marianas protecting vital shipping lanes during the conquest of Saipan and the liberation of Guam. After returning from the patrol, Lake cleared Eniwetok on 10 August with destroyer escorts Reynolds (DE-42) and Donaldson (DE-44) to escort light cruiser Montpelier (CL-57) to Pearl Harbor, arriving on 15 August.

Lake headed toward the Marshalls shepherding two merchantmen. En route she picked up from a small raft two Japanese from nearby Wotje Island. On arriving Kwajalein on 2 September, she turned the prisoners over to the Army and sailed escorting transports carrying troops to the Palaus for the invasion of Peleliu. Reaching the Palaus on 21 September, she served on escort duty in the area for the next few weeks. In November, Lake screened the fueling group which serviced units of the fast carrier task force during the invasion of the Philippines. She remained with the group off Leyte until she headed for the Bonins 15 February for the invasion of Iwo Jima.

After Iwo Jima had been secured, Lake screened the task group that supplied Task Force 58 during operations against Okinawa. Throughout the campaign, she made shuttle runs to Ulithi, escorting empty oilers. On 8 August, she was ordered to escort and give anti-submarine protection to 12 oilers and one merchantman heading for a rendezvous close off Japan. After the Japanese surrender, Lake returned to the west coast, arriving San Francisco on 13 October. She decommissioned at Mare Island, California, on 3 December and was sold on 14 December 1946 to Puget Sound Navigation Co., Seattle, Washington, for scrapping.

== Awards ==
Lake received two battle stars for World War II service.
