= Japanese submarine I-6 =

Imperial Japanese Navy J2 type submarine

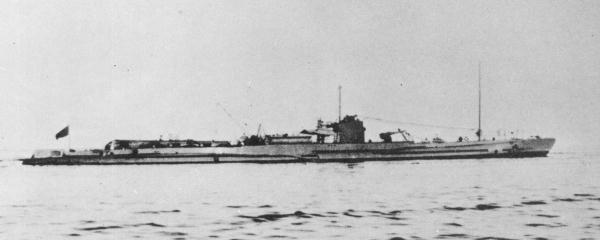
- I-6 in 1935 or 1936.

History

Imperial Japanese Navy
- Name: I-6
- Builder: Kawasaki Shipbuilding Corporation, Kobe, Japan
- Laid down: 14 October 1932
- Launched: 31 March 1934
- Completed: 15 May 1935
- Commissioned: 15 May 1935
- Decommissioned: 15 December 1938
- Recommissioned: by 1 April 1939
- Fate: Sunk 16 June 1944 (see text)
- Stricken: 10 September 1944

General characteristics
- Class & type: J2 type submarine
- Displacement: 1,900 tons (surfaced); 3,061 tons(submerged)
- Length: 98.50 m (323 ft 2 in)
- Beam: 9.06 m (29 ft 9 in)
- Draft: 5.31 m (17 ft 5 in)
- Depth: 7.58 m (24 ft 10 in)
- Propulsion: 2 × Kampon Mk.1A Model 7 diesel engines, 8,000 bhp (6,766 kW), 2 shafts; Two electric motors, 2600 shp (2,199 kW)
- Speed: 20 kn (37 km/h; 23 mph) (surfaced); 7.5 kn (13.9 km/h; 8.6 mph) (submerged)
- Range: 20,000 nmi (37,000 km; 23,000 mi) at 10 kn (19 km/h; 12 mph) (surfaced); 65 nmi (120 km; 75 mi) at 3 kn (5.6 km/h; 3.5 mph) (submerged)
- Test depth: 80 m (262 ft)
- Boats & landing craft carried: 1 x Daihatsu (added August 1942–February 1943)
- Complement: 80 officers and men
- Armament: 6 × 533 mm (21 in) torpedo tubes (4 forward, 2 aft); 17 × Type 89 torpedoes; 1 x 127 mm (5 in) gun; 1 x 13.2 mm (0.5 in) machine gun
- Aircraft carried: 1 x Yokosuka E6Y1 (until mid-1940)
- Aviation facilities: Hangar, catapult (both removed mid-1940)

I-6 was an Imperial Japanese Navy J2 type submarine commissioned in 1935. She was a large cruiser submarine that served in the Second Sino-Japanese War and World War II. During the latter conflict she operated in support of the attack on Pearl Harbor, torpedoed the aircraft carrier USS Saratoga (CV-3), conducted anti-shipping patrols in the Indian Ocean and South Pacific Ocean, and took part in the Aleutian Islands campaign and New Guinea campaign before she was sunk in June 1944.

== Design ==
I-6 was the only Junsen II- (or "J2"-) type submarine. After the four Junsen I-type submarines (I-1, I-2, I-3, and I-4), the Japanese had built I-5 as a modified Junsen I, introducing an aviation capability to the Junsen type with the inclusion of a hangar that allowed I-5 to carry and operate a floatplane. I-6 represented the next step in the evolution of this aviation capability, as she had both a hangar and a catapult for a floatplane. The next and last Junsen-type submarines, I-7 and I-8, the only Junsen III-type submarines, also each had a hangar and catapult for a floatplane.

== Construction and commissioning ==
Built by Kawasaki at Kobe, Japan, I-6 was laid down on 14 October 1932. She was launched on 31 March 1934 and completed and commissioned on 15 May 1935.

== Service history ==
=== 1935–1937 ===
Upon commissioning, I-6 was attached to the Yokosuka Naval District. On 1 June 1935, she was assigned to Submarine Division 8 in Submarine Squadron 1 in the 1st Fleet, a component of the Combined Fleet. She was taking part in maneuvers off Ise Bay at 14:27 on 1 August 1935 when she collided with the destroyer Akatsuki. She suffered damage to her periscopes and proceeded to Yokosuka, Japan, for repairs. She was reassigned directly to the Yokosuka Naval District on 15 November 1935. In July 1936, she embarked a Watanabe E9W1 (Allied reporting name "Slim") reconnaissance seaplane for testing purposes.

On 1 December 1936, I-6 returned to duty in Submarine Division 8 in Submarine Squadron 1 in the 1st Fleet. On 27 March 1937, she departed Sasebo, Japan, in company with I-1, I-2, I-3, I-4, and I-5 for training in the vicinity of Qingdao, China. The six submarines concluded the training cruise with their arrival at Ariake Bay on 6 April 1937.

=== Second Sino-Japanese War ===
I-6 docked in Yokosuka, 2 August 1935

On 7 July 1937 the first day of the Marco Polo Bridge Incident took place, beginning the Second Sino-Japanese War. In September 1937 Submarine Squadron 1 was reassigned to the 3rd Fleet, which in turn was subordinated to the China Area Fleet for service in Chinese waters. The squadron, consisting of I-1, I-2, I-3, I-4, I-5 and I-6, deployed to a base at Hong Kong with the submarine tenders Chōgei and Taigei in September 1937. From Hong Kong, the submarines began operations in support of a Japanese blockade of China and patrols of China's central and southern coast. From 20 or 21 (sources disagree) to 23 August 1937, all six submarines of Submarine Squadron 1 operated in the East China Sea as distant cover for an operation in which the battleships Nagato, Mutsu, Haruna, and Kirishima and the light cruiser Isuzu ferried troops from Tadotsu, Japan, to Shanghai, China.

Submarine Squadron 1 was based at Hong Kong until the autumn of 1938. In an effort to reduce international tensions over the conflict in China, Japan withdrew its submarines from Chinese waters in December 1938.

=== 1938–1941 ===
Remaining a unit of Submarine Division 8, I-6 was placed in Second Reserve in the Yokosuka Naval District on 15 December 1938, then on 1 April 1939 began an assignment at the Torpedo School in the Yokosuka Naval District at Yokosuka. In mid-1940, her hangar and catapult were removed, and thereafter she did not operate aircraft. Submarine Squadron 2, including I-6, was resubordinated to the 6th Fleet on 15 November 1940.

On 10 November 1941 — by which time I-4, I-5, I-6, and the submarine I-7 made up Submarine Division 8, with I-7 serving as squadron flagship — the commander-in-chief of the 6th Fleet, Vice Admiral Mitsumi Shimizu, gathered the commanding officers of the fleet's submarines together for a meeting aboard his flagship, the light cruiser Katori, which was anchored in Saeki Bay. His chief of staff briefed them on the upcoming attack on Pearl Harbor, which would bring Japan and the United States into World War II. As the Imperial Japanese Navy began to deploy for the upcoming conflict in the Pacific, I-4, I-5, I-6, and I-7 got underway from Yokosuka at 13:00 on 16 November 1941, bound for the Hawaiian Islands. The submarines received the message "Climb Mount Niitaka 1208" (Japanese: Niitakayama nobore 1208) from the Combined Fleet on 2 December 1941, indicating that war with the Allies would commence on 8 December 1941 Japan time, which was on 7 December 1941 on the other side of the International Date Line in Hawaii.

=== World War II ===
==== First war patrol ====
On 7 December 1941, the submarines of Submarine Squadron 2 took up patrol stations across a stretch of the Pacific Ocean from northeast to northwest of Oahu. The submarines had orders to conduct reconnaissance in the area and attack any ships which sortied from Pearl Harbor during or after the attack, which occurred that morning. I-6′s patrol area was between those of I-4 and I-5 and was located off the northern entrance of Kaiwi Channel between Molokai and Oahu. At 08:40 on 9 December 1941, I-6 sighted the United States Navy aircraft carrier USS Enterprise (CV-6) — which she misidentified as a Lexington-class aircraft carrier — and two heavy cruisers north of Molokai steaming northeast at 20 knots (37 km/h; 23 mph). She attempted to attack Enterprise, but was forced to go deep before she could. Several hours later she managed to transmit a sighting report, which resulted in the Japanese ordering nine submarines to attempt to intercept Enterprise, which they assumed was bound for the United States West Coast. Out of position to participate in the pursuit of Enterprise, I-6 was ordered to take up a new patrol area south of Oahu in waters between the Kauai Channel and an area southeast of Pearl Harbor. Later in December, one of her torpedomen was injured during a routine torpedo inspection; he died several days later of sepsis on 27 December 1941 and was buried at sea.

On 9 January 1942, the submarine I-18 reported sighting a Lexington-class aircraft carrier 270 nautical miles (500 km; 310 mi) northeast of Johnston Island, and the 6th Fleet ordered a number of submarines including I-1 to form a picket line northeast of Johnston Island to find the carrier. When I-1 developed engine trouble, I-6 received orders to replace her in the picket line. During the daylight hours of 10 January 1942, I-6′s lookouts sighted planes from the carrier on five occasions, and her navigator plotted their courses and used the information to estimate the carrier's position. While on the surface 270 nautical miles (500 km; 310 mi) northeast of Johnston Island at 18:41 on 11 January 1942, she sighted a U.S. Navy destroyer and submerged. Not long afterwards, the aircraft USS Saratoga (CV-3) hove into view at 19°N 165°W, steaming southeast at 15 knots (28 km/h; 17 mph) and accompanied by a heavy cruiser and another destroyer. I-6 fired three Type 89 torpedoes at Saratoga at a range of 4,700 yards (4,300 m), and at 19:15 one of them hit Saratoga amidships on her port side, killing six firemen and flooding three boiler rooms. Taking on 1,100 tons of water, Saratoga heeled to starboard and then to port and lost headway. I-6 went to a depth of 330 feet (100 m), and when the escorting destroyers began a counterattack at 19:58, they could not locate her. Her sound operator reported hearing two large explosions followed by a number of smaller ones which suggested that Saratoga had sunk and was breaking up on her way to the bottom, and after 22:00 I-6 transmitted a report claiming two hits on, and the probable sinking of, a Lexington-class aircraft carrier. In fact, Saratoga survived, but the damage I-6 inflicted kept her out of combat for the next six months.

On 12 January 1942, I-6 departed her patrol area bound for Kwajalein, which she reached on 22 January 1942 with only 800 liters (180 imp gal; 210 U.S. gal) of fuel left. She got back underway on 24 January 1942 bound for Yokosuka, which she reached on 2 February 1942. She was drydocked in early February 1942 and began a refit and overhaul.

==== Second war patrol ====
While I-6 was at Yokosuka, Submarine Squadron 2 — consisting of I-1, I-2, I-3, I-4, I-6, and the squadron flagship, I-7 — was assigned to the Dutch East Indies Invasion Force in the Southeast Area Force on 8 February 1942. On 13 February, the staff of Submarine Division 8 transferred from I-6 to I-4, and I-6 departed Yokosuka on 14 February 1942 bound for the Netherlands East Indies. She arrived at Staring Bay on the Southeast Peninsula of Celebes just southeast of Kendari on 22 February 1942. At 07:00 on 23 February 1942, she got back underway in company with I-4 and I-5 to begin her second war patrol, bound for a patrol area in the Indian Ocean west of Sumatra. While I-5 and I-6 were on the surface west of Timor en route their patrol areas on 25 February 1942, an Imperial Japanese Navy Mitsubishi C5M (Allied reporting name "Babs") reconnaissance aircraft escorted by nine Mitsubishi A6M Zero (Allied reporting name "Zeke") fighters sighted the vessels at 12:30 Japan Standard Time and misidentified them as Royal Netherlands Navy submarines. The Zeroes made repeated strafing attacks that forced I-6 to submerge, but she suffered no damage. Her patrol otherwise was uneventful, and she concluded it with her arrival at Penang in Japanese-occupied British Malaya on 8 March 1942.

==== Third war patrol ====
Orders arrived from the headquarters of the Combined Fleet for all the submarines of Submarine Squadron 2 except for I-1 to conduct reconnaissance operations along the coast of Ceylon and western coast of India in preparation for Operation C, the upcoming Indian Ocean raid by the aircraft carriers of the Combined Fleet's Mobile Force. Accordingly, I-6 departed Penang on 26 March 1942 to begin her third war patrol, assigned a patrol area in the Indian Ocean west of Bombay, India, and north of the Maldive Islands. On 27 March, the German naval staff in Berlin asked that Japan begin anti-shipping operations against Allied convoys in the Indian Ocean.

At 16:35 on 31 March 1942, I-6 was in the Indian Ocean off Eight Degree Channel when she sighted an Allied steamer. She commenced an approach and was about to fire torpedoes when she identified the ship as a hospital ship — probably the British hospital ship HMHS Vita on a voyage from Addu Atoll to the Ceylon area — and called off the attack. On the afternoon of 2 April 1942, I-6 was in the Arabian Sea 300 nautical miles (560 km; 350 mi) southwest of Bombay when she sighted the British 5,897-ton steamer Clan Ross, which was on her way from Liverpool, England, to Cochin, India, carrying 3,655 tons of general cargo and 1,027 tons of explosives. She fired two torpedoes at a range of 1,640 yards (1,500 m), scoring one hit amidships on Clan Ross′s port side. Clan Ross sank by the stern at 14:14 at 15°58′N 068°24′E with the loss of 11 crew members killed and three injured. I-6 surfaced and approached the survivors. I-6′s crew interrogated the survivors, provided them with fresh water and biscuits, and gave them the bearing to Bombay, then lined up on I-6′s afterdeck, saluted the survivors, and wished them "bon voyage" in broken French.

While on the surface at around 16:00 on 7 April 1942, I-6 encountered the British 5,424-ton merchant ship Bahadur — bound from Bombay to Basra, Iraq, with a cargo of 5,100 tons of government stores and ammunition — in the Arabian Sea 170 nautical miles (310 km; 200 mi) northwest of Bombay. I-6 submerged and fired torpedoes, but Bahadur′s crew spotted them and Bahadur made a hard turn to starboard, evaded the torpedoes, and attempted to open the range at top speed. I-6 fired two torpedoes from her stern torpedo tubes, but they also missed. She then surfaced and pursued Bahadur, opening fire with her 127-millimeter (5 in) deck gun at a range of 6,570 yards (6,010 m). The gun jammed after firing only one round, and I-6 submerged and gave up the chase. Bahadur suddenly stopped, however, and lowered her lifeboats. I-6 closed and fired two more torpedoes from a position on Bahadur′s port beam. Bahadur sank by the stern at 19:20 at 19°44′N 068°28′E.

I-6 surfaced in the Arabian Sea 300 nautical miles (560 km; 350 mi) southwest of Bombay after 08:15 on 10 April 1942 to attack two 150-ton dhows with her deck gun, claiming both of them sunk. Her patrol ended with her arrival at Seletar, Singapore, on 17 April 1942. She departed Singapore on 21 April 1942 in company with I-5 to head for Yokosuka, which she reached on 1 May 1942. She underwent repairs there until 6 June 1942.

==== Fourth war patrol ====
While I-6 was at Yokosuka, the Aleutian Islands campaign began on 3–4 June 1942 with a Japanese air raid on Dutch Harbor, Alaska, followed quickly by the unopposed Japanese occupation in the Aleutian Islands of Attu on 5 June and Kiska on 7 June 1942. On 10 June 1942, I-1, I-2, I-3, I-4, I-5, I-6, and I-7 were reassigned to the Northern Force for duty in the Aleutians, and on either 17 or 20 June 1942 I-6 set out for Aleutian waters to begin her fourth war patrol. She joined the "K" patrol line in the Unimak Pass area. On 7 July 1942, she received orders to move to the Kiska area. When the rest of Submarine Squadron 2 was ordered to return to Japan on 20 July 1942, she was ordered to remain behind and operate from Kiska.

On 29 July 1942, an Imperial Japanese Navy Kawanishi H6K (Allied reporting name "Mavis") flying boat reported an American seaplane tender at Natan Bay on the coast of Adak Island. I-6 went to investigate, but found nothing. She was anchored off Kiska along with the submarines Ro-61, Ro-64, and Ro-68 when the cruisers and destroyers of U.S. Navy Task Group 8.6 bombarded the island and harbor on 7 August 1942. All four submarines submerged to avoid damage, and some of them set off in pursuit of the task group after the shelling ceased, but none succeeded in finding the withdrawing American ships.

On 15 August 1942, I-6 received orders to return to Japan, and she got underway from Kiska the same day. While she was at sea, both Submarine Squadron 2 and Submarine Division 8 were disbanded, and she and I-5 were reassigned to Submarine Division 7. She arrived at Yokosuka on 23 August 1942 and began an overhaul.

==== August 1942–February 1943 ====
While I-6 was at Kiska, the six-month Guadalcanal campaign began on 7 August 1942 with U.S. amphibious landings on Guadalcanal, Tulagi, Florida Island, Gavutu, and Tanambogo in the southeastern Solomon Islands. As the campaign wore on, the Japanese decided to use submarines to supply their forces fighting on Guadalcanal and began fitting the submarines involved in the supply runs with a mounting on their decks that allowed each of them to carry a waterproofed Daihatsu-class landing craft for the discharge of cargo along coastlines in the Solomon Islands. I-6 received a Daihatsu mounting during her overhaul, but was still in Japan when Operation Ke, the evacuation of Japanese forces on Guadalcanal, was completed on 7 February 1943, bringing the Guadalcanal campaign to an end.

With her overhaul complete, I-6 departed Yokosuka at 10:00 on 16 February 1943 carrying a Daihatsu. She arrived at Truk at 10:15 on 23 February 1943, and later that day the commander of Submarine Squadron 7 came aboard to inspect her. On 26 February 1943 she disembarked her Daihatsu and took on fuel, supplies, and ammunition from Hie Maru. She departed her anchorage at 08:00 on 28 February 1943, made a test cruise off Uman Island, and returned at 15:00.

==== Fifth war patrol ====
On 2 March 1943, I-6 got underway from Truk for her fifth war patrol, tasked with laying nine German-made TMC magnetic mines off Brisbane, Australia, and patrolling in the South Pacific Ocean off the east coast of Australia. On 4–5 March 1943, she transited St. George's Channel off New Ireland southbound. On 8 March 1943, Fleet Radio Unit, Melbourne (FRUMEL), an American-Australian-British signals intelligence unit headquartered at Melbourne, Australia, decrypted a Japanese message — probably one transmitted on 2 March — that revealed I-6′s departure.

By 12:00 on 11 March 1943, I-6 was 60 nautical miles (110 km; 69 mi) northeast of Brisbane. At 17:15 that day she sighted a 10,000-ton Allied merchant ship — probably a Liberty ship — and at 18:44 fired two torpedoes at long range, which both missed. The merchant ship apparently did not sight the torpedo wakes and did not report an attack. On 12 March 1943, I-6 conducted a reconnaissance of Moreton Bay, Caloundra Head, and the approaches to Brisbane to determine a good location to lay her mines. At 12:00 on 13 March 1943, she was northeast of Caloundra Head at 26°42′S 153°20′E, and that evening between 18:50 and 19:14, using a device that allowed her to eject mines via her forward torpedo tubes, she laid all nine mines within 6 nautical miles (11 km; 6.9 mi) of the Australian coast along a 2,000-meter (2,200 yd) line at depths of 24 to 34 meters (79 to 112 ft) in what her commanding officer believed was a shipping lane. She then withdrew into the open ocean, and later that evening transmitted a report of her activities. FRUMEL intercepted and partially decrypted her message, learning that a Japanese submarine had laid nine mines somewhere along the east coast of Australia, but not the location of the mines because of code words I-6 had used to describe their locations. An attempt to determine the submarine's position at the time of the transmission using triangulation yielded nothing more precise than a nearly useless 500-nautical-mile (926 km; 575 mi) circle.

FRUMEL's reporting prompted instructions to coastal artillery forces to watch for a Japanese submarine and the Royal Australian Air Force (RAAF) stepped up its patrol efforts along the east coast of Australia, using Avro Anson and Bristol Beaufort aircraft. I-6 was forced to remain submerged during daylight hours by the increased RAAF activity, but she patrolled uneventfully between Fraser Island and Stradbroke Island from 14 to 16 March 1943. At 12:00 on 17 March 1943 she was southeast of Sandy Cape at 25°49′S 153°49′E. At 14:30 she sighted the two-ship Convoy BT-44 — which consisted of the armed Liberty ships Charles C. Jones and Joseph Holt escorted by the Royal Australian Navy minesweeper-corvette HMAS Gympie — just north of Point Cartwright. She fired two Type 89 torpedoes at Charles C. Jones at long range at 15:07, and at 15:11 Charles C. Jones sighted their wakes passing 20 yards (18 m) astern of her. Charles C. Jones and Joseph Holt, which both turned to avoid the torpedoes, opened fire to alert Gympie. An Anson of the RAAF's No. 71 (Reserve) Squadron patrolling overhead also sighted the wakes and dropped a sea marker at I-6′s presumed location. Gympie and the Anson then searched for I-6 until 15:30, and the Anson dropped a depth charge at 15:32, but I-6 escaped unscathed. At 20:22, she transmitted a situation report which FRUMEL intercepted and partly decrypted, and as a result two U.S. Navy patrol vessels arrived in the area and searched for her until sunset on 18 March 1943, but without success.

I-6 was off Cape Byron on 21 March 1943 when she received orders to depart her patrol area and proceed to Rabaul. She sent a situation report at 19:33 that evening which FRUMEL partially decrypted. The Allied interception of I-6′s enciphered communications had led the U.S. Navy to order three submarines — USS Stingray (SS-186), USS Halibut (SS-232), and USS Trigger (SS-237) — to lie in wait for I-6 during her patrol, but none of them sighted her, and she arrived at Rabaul at 07:30 on 27 March 1943.

Unfortunately for the Japanese, I-6′s commanding officer lacked adequate intelligence on Allied shipping patterns when I-6 laid her mines, which were planted in an area rarely visited by Allied ships. They went unnoticed until 24 March 1943, when the Royal Australian Navy sloop-of-war HMAS Swan visited the area to conduct antiaircraft gunnery practice, firing at a target towed by an RAAF Lockheed Hudson. As spent shells and shell fragments fell into the water, Swan observed two large explosions close aboard which reached 400 feet (122 m) in height and 130 feet (40 m) across their bases. At least two mines clearly had exploded, and the size of the explosions suggested that each of them separately may have represented the detonation of two mines, although Allied forces could not substantiate this possibility. Gympie arrived in the area and began a minesweeping effort that after a number of days detonated another mine, but repeated sweeping found no more by the time minesweeping operations ended in September 1943. The mines were designed to rest on the seafloor and were not fixed in place, meaning that they could slide or roll if laid on sloping surfaces, and the Allies found the mines in a somewhat different location — 8 nautical miles (15 km; 9.2 mi) offshore in waters 30 to 40 meters (98 to 131 ft) deep — than I-6 reported laying them.

==== New Guinea campaign ====
While I-6 was on patrol, a Japanese attempt to carry supplies and reinforcements to New Guinea for their forces fighting in the New Guinea campaign in a convoy of eight ships escorted by eight destroyers ended in disaster in the Bismarck Sea when Allied aircraft sank all eight ships and four of the destroyers in the Battle of the Bismarck Sea, fought from 2 to 4 March 1943. The Japanese decided to use submarines instead to carry supplies and troops to New Guinea. Accordingly, on 29 March 1943 I-6 was reassigned to the Southeast Area Fleet for duty running supplies to Lae on the coast of New Guinea. She got underway from Rabaul for her first supply run on 3 April 1943, carrying 30 passengers and 77 supply drums containing 3.3 tons of weapons and ammunition, 22 tons of clothing, and 15.4 tons of food. She arrived at Lae on the coast of New Guinea on 5 April 1943, where she disembarked her passengers and discharged her cargo onto Daihatsus. She brought aboard four Imperial Japanese Army soldiers who were taking the regimental colors of the 41st Infantry Regiment to Rabaul and 25 other passengers and departed for Rabaul. Shortly after her departure she sighted Allied motor torpedo boats, but she crash-dived and avoided them and arrived safely at Rabaul on 7 April 1943.

I-6 next called at Lae on 11 April 1943, unloading 26 passengers and 77 supply drums containing 4.4 tons of weapons and ammunition, 19 tons of clothing, and food and embarking 42 passengers for Rabaul. On her third supply run, she visited Lae on 17 April 1943, discharging 28 passengers and 77 supply drums containing four tons of weapons and ammunition and 17 tons of clothing. After embarking 39 passengers, she got back underway for Rabaul. She sighted Allied motor torpedo boats near the Tami Islands during the return trip, but submerged and avoided them. While at Rabaul, she was reassigned on 21 April 1943 to the Northern District Force in the 5th Fleet to support the supply and reinforcement of the Japanese garrisons on Attu and Kiska in the Aleutian Islands.

I-6′s redeployment to the North Pacific was deferred, and for the time being she continued her supply runs between Rabaul and Lae. On her fourth run, she delivered 20 passengers and supply drums containing one ton of ammunition, 16 tons of clothing, and 16 tons of food on 24 April 1943 and left for Rabaul with 42 passengers aboard. She visited Lae on her fifth run on 30 April 1943 and dropped off 30 passengers and supply drums holding three tons of weapons and ammunition, 19 tons of clothing, and one ton of food. She embarked 41 passengers and put back to sea. At dawn she sighted Allied motor torpedo boats and spent an hour evading them, but she arrived safely at Rabaul. On her sixth run, she called at Lae on 7 May 1943 to deliver 10 passengers and 77 supply drums carrying 2.8 tons of weapons, four tons of artillery shells, and 13 tons of clothing and pick up 12 passengers.

I-6′s seventh run was more eventful. She arrived at Lae on 13 May 1943, unloaded 10 passengers and supply drums containing 11.5 tons of weapons, five tons of ammunition, and nine tons of food. After embarking four passengers, she began her return trip to Rabaul. Shortly thereafter, the U.S. Navy PT boats PT-150 and PT-152 sighted I-6 making 12 knots (22 km/h; 14 mph) on the surface 5 nautical miles (9.3 km; 5.8 mi) off Lae at a range of 6,000 yards (5,500 m). Each PT boat fired two torpedoes at I-6 at long range, but I-6 stopped and the torpedoes missed ahead of her. PT-150 then closed to 4,000 yards (3,700 m) and fired another torpedo at the stationary I-6, but the submarine suddenly accelerated and the torpedo missed astern. The PT boats then ran parallel to I-6′s course and turned toward her to decrease the range, but she submerged. The PT boats then stopped, and I-6 fired a torpedo at them, which passed under PT-150′s bow without detonating, bringing the action to a close. I-6 proceeded with her voyage to Rabaul, but on 14 May 1943 she diverted from it so that she and I-5 could search for the crews of Mitsubishi G4M (Allied reporting name "Betty") bombers shot down during a raid on Oro Bay. She rescued two aviators from the water 60 nautical miles (110 km; 69 mi) off Buna, New Guinea.

On her eighth run, I-6 called at Lae on 21 May 1943 to deliver 5.1 tons of weapons, 5.4 tons of ammunition, 4.6 tons of food, and 31 passengers. She departed for Rabaul after embarking 40 passengers. On her ninth and final run, she visited Lae on 28 May 1943 and dropped off 18 tons of food, 4.3 tons of weapons and medicine, two tons of clothes, a Daihatsu, and 23 passengers. Not scheduled to return to Rabaul, she did not embark passengers. She instead got back underway bound directly for Truk. Reassigned along with I-5 to the 6th Fleet while at sea on 31 May 1943, she stopped at Truk from 1 to 2 June 1943, then proceeded to Yokosuka, which she reached on 8 June 1943. She underwent repairs there.

==== Sixth and seventh war patrols ====
In the Aleutian Islands, the Japanese garrison on Attu had been annihilated by invading U.S. forces in the Battle of Attu between 11 and 30 May 1943. On 21 May 1943, with the situation on Attu deteriorating, the Japanese Imperial General Headquarters decided to evacuate the isolated garrison on Kiska. The evacuation began by submarine on 26 May 1943. Submarine Division 7 was reassigned to the 5th Fleet on 1 July 1943, and on either 1 or 2 July I-6 set out from Yokosuka on her sixth war patrol, bound for Paramushiro in the Kuril Islands. After calling at Paramushiro, she deployed to support the ongoing evacuation of Kiska, patrolling with I-5 in the Bering Sea north-northeast of Kiska. Between 17 and 19 July 1943, the two submarines sighted three U.S. destroyers on three separate occasions, but were unable to attack them. The Japanese completed the evacuation on 28 July 1943, and I-6 concluded her patrol with her arrival at Paramushiro on 4 August 1943.

I-6 departed Paramushiro on 16 August 1943 for her seventh war patrol, assigned a patrol area off Kiska. The patrol was uneventful, and she returned to Paramushiro on 3 September 1943. She got back underway on 5 September 1943 and arrived on 10 September at Yokosuka, where she underwent repairs.

==== New Guinea and Bismarck Archipelago ====
On 25 October 1943, I-6 was reassigned to the Southeast Area Fleet to resume duties on supply runs to New Guinea and in the Bismarck Archipelago. On 30 October, she departed Yokosuka bound for Rabaul. From Rabaul, she began supply runs to Sio on the Huon Peninsula in New Guinea, calling at Sio on 16 November and 4 December 1943 without incident but coming under attack by Allied aircraft during her third visit on 18 December 1943 while unloading cargo; the attack forced her to depart before she could completely unload, and she returned to Rabaul with some cargo still aboard. She visited Sio for the fourth and final time on 27 December 1943 and early in the morning, just after she began her return voyage to Rabaul, she encountered Allied motor torpedo boats, which depth-charged her. Later that day, Allied aircraft attacked her. She emerged from both attacks unscathed, and on the same day received orders to intercept an Allied convoy. With only two torpedoes aboard, she patrolled in the Dampier Strait from 28 December 1943 to 1 January 1944, but did not find the Allied ships.

On 4 January 1944, I-6 began a new series of supply runs, shuttling between Rabaul and Iboki, New Guinea. Her first and second round trips — from 4 to 10 January 1944, calling at Iboki on 6 January, and from 17 to 21 January 1944, calling at Iboki on 19 January — involved the delivery of supplies. On her third run, in which she departed Rabaul on 28 January 1944, she carried only troops, which she disembarked at Iboki on 30 January 1944, damaging her screws on an uncharted reef in the process. She returned to Rabaul on 1 February 1944, and on that day Submarine Division 7 was attached directly to 6th Fleet headquarters. Her next supply trip saw her depart Rabaul on 3 February 1944 to deliver supplies to Sarmi, New Guinea. She received orders on 5 February 1944 to return to Yokosuka. She got underway from Rabaul on 13 February 1944, called at Lorengau on Manus Island in the Admiralty Islands on 17 February 1944 to deliver a cargo of 12 heavy machine guns and their ammunition, then departed the same day for Yokosuka, which she reached on 29 February 1944 to begin an overhaul.

==== Loss ====
On 15 June 1944, the Marianas campaign began with the U.S. invasion of Saipan. Anticipating the invasion, on 13 June 1944 the commander of the 6th Fleet, Vice Admiral Takeo Takagi, ordered all available Japanese submarines to deploy east of the Mariana Islands. With her overhaul recently completed, I-6 set out from Yokosuka bound for the waters off Saipan on 16 June 1944. At 22:33 that evening the Japanese 5,123-ton armed cargo ship Toyokawa Maru — a member of Convoy 3606, consisting of four merchant ships escorted by three coastal defense ships and a submarine chaser, which had left Ogasawara in the Bonin Islands on 14 June 1944 bound for Yokosuka — sighted I-6 surfacing near the convoy. Mistaking her for an enemy submarine, Toyokawa Maru sounded a submarine alert, turned sharply toward I-6, and rammed her on her starboard side just abaft her conning tower. I-6 listed heavily, capsized, and sank a few minutes later, and Toyokawa Maru followed up by dropping depth charges and machine gunning the water where I-6 sank. None of I-6′s crew of 104 survived.

On 1 July 1944, the Japanese ordered I-6 to rescue Takagi and his staff from their headquarters on Saipan, which was threatened by advancing American forces. When I-6 did not acknowledge receipt of the message, the Japanese declared her missing. Sixth Fleet headquarters made a final attempt to contact her on 3 July 1944.

Alternative accounts of the loss of I-6 claim that Toyokawa Maru sank her off Saipan on 30 June 1944, or that the destroyer escort USS William C. Miller (DE-259) and high-speed transport USS Gilmer (APD-11) sank her 70 nautical miles (130 km; 81 mi) west of Tinian at 15°18′N 144°26′E on 19 July 1944.

I-6 was stricken from the Navy list on 10 September 1944.
