= Type C submarine =

World War II Japanese submarine class

Class overview
- Name: Type-C submarines
- Builders: Kure Naval Arsenal; Sasebo Naval Arsenal; Kawasaki Shipbuilding; Mitsubishi Heavy Industries
- Operators: Imperial Japanese Navy
- Preceded by: Junsen Type B
- Succeeded by: Type D / Sen'yu-Dai Type
- Subclasses: Type-C (I-16-class); Type-C Modified (I-52-class)
- Built: 1937-1944
- In commission: 1940-1945

The Cruiser submarine Type-C (巡潜丙型潜水艦, Junsen Hei-gata sensuikan) was one of the first classes of submarine in the Imperial Japanese Navy (IJN) to serve during the Second World War. Type-C submarines were better armed than the Type-A and Type-B. The Type-Cs were also used as Kō-hyōteki or Kaiten mother ships, for this reason they were not equipped with aviation facilities.

== Class variants ==
The Type-C submarines were divided into three classes:

- Type-C (丙型(伊十六型), Hei-gata, I-16-class)
- Type-C Mod. (丙型改(伊五十二型), Hei-gata Kai, I-52-class)
- Type V22B (第379号艦型, Dai-379-Gō kan-gata, Vessel number 379-class). However, the Vessel number 379-class was never built.

=== Type-C (I-16 class) ===
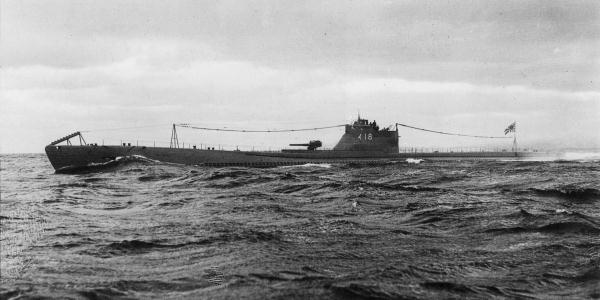
I-18 in 1941

Project number S38 and S38B (Latter batch). They were based on the I-7 class. Eight boats were built between 1937 and 1944 under the Maru 3 Programme (Boats 44 - 48) and the Maru Kyū Programme (Boats 376 - 378).

- Boats in class

Boat No.	Boat	Builder	Laid down	Launched	Completed	Results	Fate
44	I-16	Mitsubishi, Kōbe Shipyard; Kure Naval Arsenal (after launch)	15–09–1937	28–07–1938	20–03–1940	Sank Yugoslav merchant ship Susak on 06–06–1942. Sank Greek merchant vessel Aghios Georgios IV on 07–06–1942. Sank Yugoslav merchant ship Supetar on 12–06–1942. Sank Swedish merchantman Eknaren on 01–07–1942.	Sunk by USS England northeast of Buin at 05°10′S 158°10′E on 19–05–1944.
45	I-18	Sasebo Naval Arsenal	25–08–1937	12–11–1938	31–01–1941	Sank Norwegian merchant ship Wilford on 08–06–1942. Sank Dutch merchant vessel De Weert on 01–07–1942. Sank RMS Mundra on 08–07–1942.	Sunk by USS Fletcher southeast of Guadalcanal at 14°15′S 161°53′E on 11–02–1943.
46	I-20	Mitsubishi, Kōbe Shipyard	16–11–1937	25–01–1939	26–09–1940	Damaged HMS Ramillies on 09-05-1942 by Kō-hyōteki. Damaged RMS British Loyalty on 09-05-1942 by Kō-hyōteki. Sank Panamanian merchant ship Johnstown on 05–06–1942. Sank Greek merchant vessel Christos Markettos on 08–06–1942. Sank RMS Mahronda 11–06–1942. Sank Panamanian merchantman Hellenic Trader on 12–06–1942. Sank RMS Clifton Hall on 12–06–1942. Sank Norwegian merchant ship Goviken on 30–06–1942. Sank RMS Steaua Romana on 30–06–1942. Damaged unknown merchant ship on 03-12-1942 by Kō-hyōteki.	(1). Sunk by USS Ellet at New Hebrides on 03–09–1943. (2). Sunk by USS Eaton at Vella Lavella on 01–10–1943.
47	I-22	Kawasaki, Kōbe Shipyard	25–11–1937	23–12–1938	10–03–1941		Sunk by a PBY-5A Catalina flying boat near Malaita in the Solomon Islands at 11°22′S 162°20′E on 6–10–1942.
48	I-24	Sasebo Naval Arsenal	05–12–1938	12–11–1939	31–10–1941	Sank HMAS Kuttabul on 31-05-1942 by Kō-hyōteki. Sank Australian merchant ship Iron Chieftain on 03–06–1942. Damaged RMS Orestes on 09–06–1942. Damaged USS Alchiba on 07-12-1942 by Kō-hyōteki.	Rammed and sunk by USS PC-487 at Kiska 53°16′N 174°24′E on 11–06–1943.
376	I-46 (Latter batch)	Sasebo Naval Arsenal	21–11–1942	03–06–1943	29–02–1944		Probably lost in an accident or sunk by enemy attack east of Leyte Gulf, after 26–10–1944.
377	I-47 (Latter batch)	Sasebo Naval Arsenal	21–11–1942	29–09–1943	10–07–1944	Sank USS Mississinewa on 20-11-1944 by Kaiten.	Converted to a Kaiten mother ship, at the end of 1944, decommissioned on 30–11–1945, sunk as a target off the Gotō Islands on 01–04–1946.
378	I-48 (Latter batch)	Sasebo Naval Arsenal	19–06–1943	12–12–1943	05–09–1944		Converted to a Kaiten mother ship, end of 1944, sunk by USS Corbesier and USS Conklin at Ulithi 09°45′N 138°20′E on 23–01–1945.

=== Type-C Mod. (I-52 class) ===
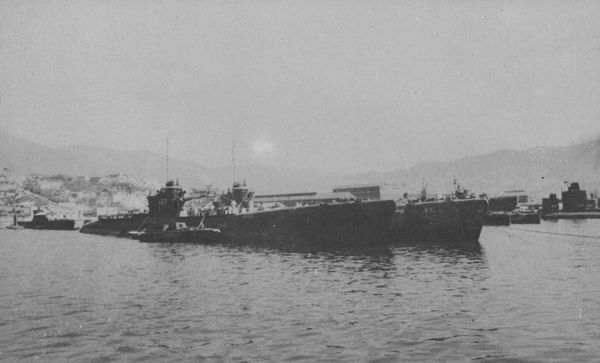
I-53 in 1945

Project number S37D. Twenty boats were planned under the Maru Tsui Programme (Boats 625 - 632) and the Kai-Maru 5 Programme (Boats 5141 - 5155). According to their Project number, they were one of the variants of the Type-B submarine. Seventeen boats were cancelled in late 1943, because the IJN was planning to build the Type E submarine (戊型潜水艦, Bo-gata sensuikan) which was to become the primary submarine in 1945.

- Boats in class

Boat No.	Boat	Builder	Laid down	Launched	Completed	Results	Fate
625	I-52	Kure Naval Arsenal	18–03–1942	10–11–1942	28–12–1943		Sunk by aircraft from USS Bogue west of Cap-Vert at 15°16′N 39°55′W on 24–06–1944.
626	I-53	Kure Naval Arsenal	15–05–1942	24–12–1942	20–02–1944	Damaged USS Marathon 21-07-1945 by Kaiten. Sank USS Underhill on 24-07-1945 by Kaiten. Damaged USS Earl V. Johnson on 04-08-1945 by Kaiten.	Converted to a Kaiten mother ship in July 1944. Decommissioned on 30–11–1945, sunk as a target off the Gotō Islands on 01–04–1946.
628	I-55	Kure Naval Arsenal	15–06–1942	20–04–1943	20–04–1944		Sunk by USS Wyman, USS Reynolds and aircraft from USS Hoggatt Bay east of the Mariana Islands on 28–07–1944.
630; 632	I-57; I-59						Cancelled in 1943.
5141 - 5155							Cancelled in 1943.

=== Type V22B ===
Project number S49B. Twenty eight boats were planned under the Maru Kyū Programme (Boats 379 - 381) and the Kai-Maru 5 Programme (Boats 5156 - 5180). All boats were cancelled in late 1943, because the IJN was planning to build the Type E submarine (戊型潜水艦, Bo-gata sensuikan).

- Boats in class

Boat No.	Boat	Builder	Laid down	Launched	Completed	Fate
379 - 381						Cancelled in 1943.
5156 - 5180						Cancelled in 1943.

== Characteristics ==
Type		Type-C (I-16)	Type-C Latter batch (I-46)	Type-C Mod. (I-52)	Type V22B
Displacement	Surfaced	2,184 long tons (2,219 t)	2,184 long tons (2,219 t)	2,095 long tons (2,129 t)	2,285 long tons (2,322 t)
Displacement	Submerged	3,561 long tons (3,618 t)	3,564 long tons (3,621 t)	3,644 long tons (3,702 t)	No data
Length (overall)		109.30 m (358 ft 7 in)	109.30 m (358 ft 7 in)	108.70 m (356 ft 8 in)	106.50 m (349 ft 5 in) (waterline)
Beam		9.10 m (29 ft 10 in)	9.10 m (29 ft 10 in)	9.30 m (30 ft 6 in)	9.64 m (31 ft 8 in)
Draft		5.34 m (17 ft 6 in)	5.35 m (17 ft 7 in)	5.12 m (16 ft 10 in)	5.26 m (17 ft 3 in)
Depth		7.80 m (25 ft 7 in)	7.80 m (25 ft 7 in)	7.90 m (25 ft 11 in)	No data
Power plant and shaft		2 × Kampon Mk.2 Model 10 diesels 2 shafts	2 × Kampon Mk. 2 Model 10 diesels 2 shafts	2 × Kampon Mk. 2 Model 10 diesels 2 shafts	2 × Kampon Mk. 2 Model 10 diesels 2 shafts
Power	Surfaced	12,400 bhp	12,400 bhp	4,700 bhp	11,000 bhp
Power	Submerged	2,000 shp	2,000 shp	1,200 shp	2,400 shp
Speed	Surfaced	23.6 knots (43.7 km/h)	23.6 knots (43.7 km/h)	17.7 knots (32.8 km/h)	22.4 knots (41.5 km/h)
Speed	Submerged	8.0 knots (14.8 km/h)	8.0 knots (14.8 km/h)	6.5 knots (12.0 km/h)	8.0 knots (14.8 km/h)
Range	Surfaced	14,000 nmi (26,000 km) at 16 knots (30 km/h)	14,000 nmi (26,000 km) at 16 knots (30 km/h)	21,000 nmi (39,000 km) at 16 knots (30 km/h)	14,000 nmi (26,000 km) at 16 knots (30 km/h)
Range	Submerged	60 nmi (110 km) at 3 knots (5.6 km/h)	60 nmi (110 km) at 3 knots (5.6 km/h)	105 nmi (194 km) at 3 knots (5.6 km/h)	80 nmi (150 km) at 3 knots (5.6 km/h)
Test depth		100 m (330 ft)	100 m (330 ft)	100 m (330 ft)	100 m (330 ft)
Fuel		816 tons	751 tons	842.8 tons	735 tons
Complement		95	94	94	No data
Armament (initial)		• 8 × 533 mm (21 in) Torpedo tubes (8 × front) • 20 × Type 95 torpedoes • 1 × 140 mm (5.5 in) L/40 11th Year Type Naval gun • 2 × Type 96 25mm AA guns	• 8 × 533 mm (21 in) TTs (8 × front) • 20 × Type 95 torpedoes • 1 × 140 mm (5.5 in) L/40 11th Year Type Naval gun • 2 × Type 96 25mm AA guns	• 6 × 533 mm (21 in) TTs (6 × front) • 17 × Type 95 torpedoes • 2 × 140 mm (5.5 in) L/40 11th Year Type Naval gun • 2 × Type 96 25mm AA guns	• 8 × 533 mm (21 in) TTs (8 × front) • 18 × torpedoes • 1 × 140 mm Naval gun • 4 × 25mm AA guns • 8 × naval mines

== Bibliography ==
- "Rekishi Gunzō"., History of Pacific War Vol.17 I-Gō Submarines, Gakken (Japan), January 1998, ISBN 4-05-601767-0
- Rekishi Gunzō, History of Pacific War Vol.35 Kō-hyōteki and Kōryū, Gakken (Japan), April 2002, ISBN 4-05-602741-2
- Rekishi Gunzō, History of Pacific War Vol.36 Kairyū and Kaiten, Gakken (Japan), May 2002, ISBN 4-05-602693-9
- Rekishi Gunzō, History of Pacific War Extra, "Perfect guide, The submarines of the Imperial Japanese Forces", Gakken (Japan), March 2005, ISBN 4-05-603890-2
- Model Art Extra No.537, Drawings of Imperial Japanese Naval Vessels Part-3, Model Art Co. Ltd. (Japan), May 1999, Book code 08734–5
- The Maru Special, Japanese Naval Vessels No.31 Japanese Submarines I, Ushio Shobō (Japan), September 1979, Book code 68343-31

== See also ==
- Cruiser submarine
