= USS Wyman =

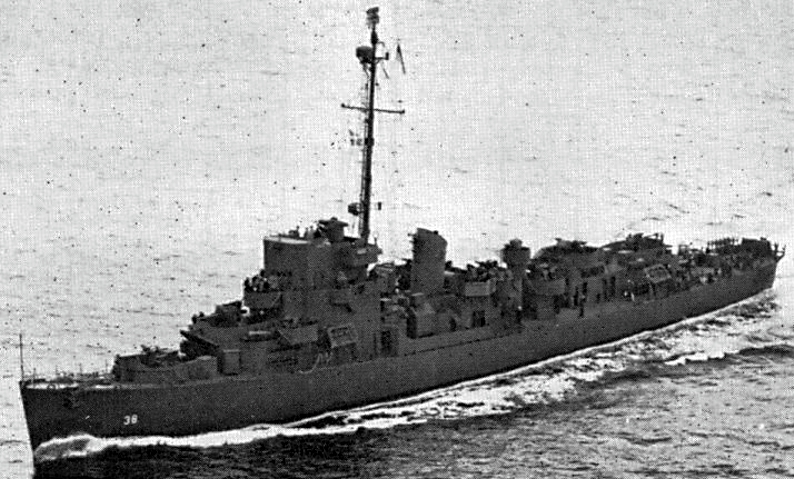
- Wyman underway on 19 September 1943

History

United States
- Name: USS Wyman
- Laid down: 7 September 1942
- Launched: 3 June 1943
- Commissioned: 1 September 1943
- Decommissioned: 21 December 1945
- Reclassified: DE-38, 16 June 1943
- Stricken: 8 January 1946
- Honors and awards: 6 battle stars (World War II)
- Fate: Sold for scrapping, 16 April 1947

General characteristics
- Type: Evarts-class destroyer escort
- Displacement: 1,140 long tons (1,158 t) standard; 1,430 long tons (1,453 t) full
- Length: 289 ft 5 in (88.21 m) o/a; 283 ft 6 in (86.41 m) w/l
- Beam: 35 ft (11 m)
- Draft: 11 ft (3.4 m) (max)
- Propulsion: 4 × General Motors Model 16-278A diesel engines with electric drive, 6,000 shp (4,474 kW); 2 screws
- Speed: 19 knots (35 km/h; 22 mph)
- Range: 4,150 nmi (7,690 km)
- Complement: 15 officers and 183 enlisted
- Armament: 3 × single 3"/50 Mk.22 dual purpose guns; 1 × quad 1.1"/75 Mk.2 AA gun; 9 × 20 mm Mk.4 AA guns; 1 × Hedgehog Projector Mk.10 (144 rounds); 8 × Mk.6 depth charge projectors; 2 × Mk.9 depth charge tracks

USS Wyman (DE-38) was an Evarts-class destroyer escort of the United States Navy during World War II. She was promptly sent off into the Pacific Ocean to protect convoys and other ships from Japanese submarines and fighter aircraft. She performed dangerous work, including participating in the sinking of two Japanese submarines, and was awarded six battle stars.

== Design ==
The Evarts-class destroyer escorts were 289 ft 5 in (88.21 m) long overall, and they had a beam of 35 ft 2 in (10.72 m). They had an average draft of 10 ft 1 in (3.07 m) at their full load displacement of 1,416 long tons (1,439 t). Each ship had a normal crew numbered 156 officers and sailors.

Wyman was propelled by a pair of diesel motors manufactured by General Motors, which drove a pair of screw propellers. Her propulsion system was rated to produce 6,000 brake horsepower (4,500 kW) for a top speed of 19.5 knots (36.1 km/h; 22.4 mph). Oil storage amounted to between 131 and 197 long tons (133 and 200 t), which allowed a cruising radius of up to 6,000 nautical miles (11,000 km; 6,900 mi) at an economical pace of 10 knots (19 km/h; 12 mph).

The ship's armament consisted of a main battery of three 3-inch (76 mm) /50-caliber guns in individual pivot mounts, which could be used against air or surface targets. These were supported by a light anti-aircraft battery that initially consisted of four 1.1 in (28 mm) /75-caliber guns in a quadruple mount and nine 20 mm (0.79 in) Oerlikon guns. For attacks against submarines, the ship was equipped with a Hedgehog mortar, eight depth charge throwers, and two depth charge racks.

== Service history ==
She was originally laid down as BDE-38 on 7 September 1942 at Bremerton, Washington, by the Puget Sound Navy Yard for the Royal Navy; launched on 3 June 1943; and sponsored by Mrs. Joe L. April. However, the ship's transfer to the United Kingdom was canceled. The destroyer escort was designated DE-38 on 16 June and was renamed Wyman on the 23rd after Eldon Wyman, a naval officer killed aboard USS Oklahoma during the attack on Pearl Harbor. The ship was commissioned at the Puget Sound Navy Yard on 1 September 1943, Lt. Comdr. Robert W. Copeland, USNR, in command.

Following shakedown, Wyman departed Puget Sound on 7 November, bound for Hawaii, and arrived at Pearl Harbor on the 14th. Assigned to duty with Submarines, Pacific Fleet, the destroyer escort operated out of Pearl Harbor on submarine exercises from 1 December 1943 through the spring of 1944.

=== Anti-submarine operations ===
Detached from this duty on 22 June 1944, Wyman sailed for the Marshall Islands and began anti-submarine warfare (ASW) operations in the American convoy routes between Eniwetok and Saipan. Joining Task Group (TG) 12.2, based around Hoggatt Bay (CVE-75), Wyman departed Eniwetok on 5 July and headed for the ASW operating area. En route, she left her formation to investigate a submarine contact which had been developed and depth-charged by Lake (DE-301). Wyman fired one barrage of depth charge bombs from her "hedgehog" but did not come up with evidence that she had either damaged or destroyed her enemy. The destroyer escort arrived in her patrol zone on 9 July and refueled from Guadalupe (AO-32) on the 11th. She remained in the area from 12 to 18 July before proceeding to investigate a surface radar contact at 0024 on the 19th. The destroyer escort closed the range until she lost radar contact at 0045 and switched immediately to her sonar. Wyman picked up a strong metallic echo and, at 0051, fired a full pattern of "hedgehog" projectiles, with negative results. She reloaded, opened the range, and then closed for a second attack, as Reynolds (DE-42) closed in the meantime.

At 01:25, Wyman launched a second full pattern from her hedgehog – dead on the target. A series of violent explosions rocked the destroyer escort, as the depth bombs blew the submarine apart. Wyman circled to starboard and passed through her own firing point in order to regain contact but picked up only a "mush" echo – indicative that her contact had been destroyed. Remaining on the scene of the action, Wyman lowered a motor whaleboat to recover oil samples from the water and to fish out debris. In the large, spreading, oil slick, men in the boat picked up two five-gallon oil cans, one small gasoline can, and a piece of teak wood.

As it was gathering this materiel, Wyman's motor whaler was strafed by two planes from Hoggatt Bay, whose pilots had mistaken the boat for a surfaced submarine. (According to my father who was on the motor launch, Wyman's captain broke radio silence and informed the Hoggatt Bay, that if their planes made another pass on his men, the Wyman would "open fire" on them.) There were no fatalities, and the injured men were soon transferred to Hoggatt Bay for medical treatment. Oil from the sunken submarine – later identified by a post-war examination of Japanese records as Ro-48 – continued to bubble up in copious quantities into the next day. Satisfied that the kill was definite, Wyman rejoined TG 12.2 and arrived at Eniwetok on 22 July.

Her respite was short, however, for she again got underway on 26 July. Two days later, at 1733, lookouts in Hoggatt Bay and Wyman simultaneously spotted the I-55 running on the surface. Wyman and Reynolds charged after the enemy submersible as she went deep in an effort to escape. Wyman picked up the fleeing I-boat by sonar at 1805. Eight minutes later, the destroyer escort fired a "hedgehog" pattern which struck its target with deadly accuracy. Wyman's sound operators heard the sounds of heavy explosions from beneath the sea as I-55 began to blow apart. While opening the range at 1819, a further set of explosions rocked the sea, sounding the death knell for the enemy I-boat. Reynolds then added a "hedgehog" pattern, but her target had already perished. Large quantities of debris and oil, visible evidence of Wyman's second "kill", soon came to the surface.

With the dissolution of TG 12.2 on 9 August, Wyman joined TG 57.3 for escort duty in waters between the Marshalls and Marianas. On 31 August, the destroyer escort escorted fuel ships of Task Unit 30.8.10 to a rendezvous with TG 38.4 and back to link up with TG 38.2 and Task Force 34. After completing this mission on 20 October 1944, the day of the first landings in the Philippine Islands, Wyman resumed escort operations between the Marshalls and Marianas and also participated in hunter-killer operations into early 1945, supporting the invasion of the strategic island of Iwo Jima.

She departed from Ulithi on 13 March 1945 and proceeded to the fueling area for TG 50.8 for duty as escort with the Logistics Support Group for the invasion of Okinawa. During this tour of duty, which lasted into the spring of 1945, she sank three floating Japanese mines by gunfire. The destroyer escort remained with the 5th Fleet until 10 June, continuing her unglamorous but vital role, screening the important convoys bringing men and munitions to the war zone for the drive against the Japanese homeland. After a stop at Guam, Wyman headed for the United States, proceeding via Pearl Harbor and Eniwetok, and arrived at San Francisco, California, on 15 July.

=== End of the war ===
The end of the war changed the Navy's plans for the ship. On 17 August – while in the midst of her scheduled 42-day overhaul during which she was to receive her "ultimate approved armament" (This armament was to be a large deck gun to be fitted to the Wyman for the purpose of grounding the Wyman on the Japanese coast and shelling the Japanese mainland in preparation for the invasion of American Marines. Crew were told to get their affairs in order while on leave. The crew was to report back to the ship to prepare for the invasion which never happened. The atom bomb ended those plans and the Wyman crew never sailed again.)– all work on the ship "except that necessary to place the ship in safe and habitable condition" was halted. Declared surplus to the needs of the postwar Navy, Wyman was decommissioned on 17 December 1945 and struck from the Navy List on 8 January 1946. Having been stripped prior to her decommissioning, the ship's hulk was sold to the National Metal and Steel Company, of Terminal Island, California, on 16 April 1947 for scrapping, a process which was completed by 14 March 1948.

== Awards ==
- Combat Action Ribbon (retroactive)
- American Campaign Medal
- Asiatic-Pacific Campaign Medal (with six service stars)
- World War II Victory Medal
