= Japanese submarine I-18 =

Imperial Japanese Navy Type C cruiser submarine of the C1 sub-class

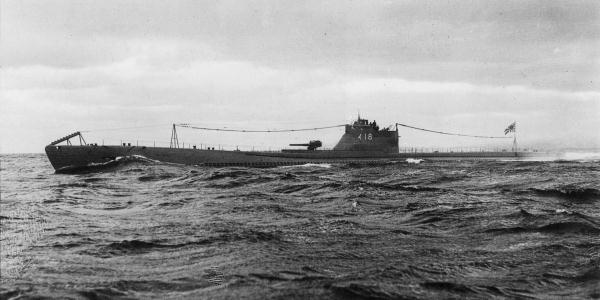
- I-18, ca. January 1941.

History

Empire of Japan
- Name: Submarine No. 38
- Builder: Sasebo Naval Arsenal, Sasebo, Japan
- Laid down: 25 August 1937
- Launched: 12 November 1938
- Renamed: I-18
- Completed: 31 January 1941
- Commissioned: 31 January 1941
- Fate: Sunk in the Coral Sea, 11 February 1943
- Stricken: 1 April 1943

General characteristics
- Class & type: Type C submarine
- Displacement: 2,595 tonnes (2,554 long tons) surfaced; 3,618 tonnes (3,561 long tons) submerged
- Length: 109.3 m (358 ft 7 in) overall
- Beam: 9.1 m (29 ft 10 in)
- Draft: 5.3 m (17 ft 5 in)
- Installed power: 12,400 bhp (9,200 kW) (diesel); 2,000 hp (1,500 kW) (electric motor)
- Propulsion: Diesel-electric; 1 × diesel engine; 1 × electric motor
- Speed: 23.5 knots (43.5 km/h; 27.0 mph) surfaced; 8 knots (15 km/h; 9.2 mph) submerged
- Range: 14,000 nmi (26,000 km; 16,000 mi) at 16 knots (30 km/h; 18 mph) surfaced; 60 nmi (110 km; 69 mi) at 3 knots (5.6 km/h; 3.5 mph) submerged
- Test depth: 100 m (330 ft)
- Crew: 95
- Armament: 8 × bow 533 mm (21 in) torpedo tubes; 1 × 14 cm (5.5 in) deck gun; 2 × single or twin 25 mm (1 in) Type 96 anti-aircraft guns
- Notes: Fitted to carry 1 × Type A midget submarine

I-18 (伊18) was the second Type C cruiser submarines built for the Imperial Japanese Navy. During World War II, she operated as the mother ship for a midget submarine during the attack on Pearl Harbor and the attack of Diego-Suarez, conducted a war patrol in the Indian Ocean, and served in the Guadalcanal campaign before she was sunk in February 1943.

== Design and description ==
The Type C submarines were derived from the earlier Kaidai-type VI with a heavier torpedo armament for long-range attacks. They displaced 2,595 tonnes (2,554 long tons) surfaced and 3,618 tonnes (3,561 long tons) submerged. The submarines were 109.3 meters (358 ft 7 in) long, had a beam of 9.1 meters (29 ft 10 in) and a draft of 5.3 meters (17 ft 5 in). They had a diving depth of 100 meters (330 ft).

For surface running, the boats were powered by two 6,200-brake-horsepower (4,623 kW) diesel engines, each driving one propeller shaft. When submerged each propeller was driven by a 1,000-horsepower (746 kW) electric motor. They could reach 23.6 knots (43.7 km/h; 27.2 mph) on the surface and 8 knots (15 km/h; 9.2 mph) underwater. On the surface, the C1s had a range of 14,000 nautical miles (26,000 km; 16,000 mi) at 16 knots (30 km/h; 18 mph); submerged, they had a range of 60 nmi (110 km; 69 mi) at 3 knots (5.6 km/h; 3.5 mph).

The boats were armed with eight internal bow 53.3 cm (21.0 in) torpedo tubes and carried a total of 20 torpedoes. They were also armed with a single 140 mm (5.5 in)/40 deck gun and two single or twin mounts for 25 mm (1 in) Type 96 anti-aircraft guns. They were equipped to carry one Type A midget submarine aft of the conning tower.

== Construction and commissioning ==
Ordered under the 3rd Naval Armaments Supplement Programme and built by the Sasebo Naval Arsenal at Sasebo, Japan, I-18 was laid down on 25 August 1937 with the name Submarine No. 38. Launched on 12 November, 1938, she was completed and commissioned on 31 January 1941, by which time she had been renamed I-18.

== Service history ==
=== Pre-World War II ===
Upon commissioning, I-18 was attached to the Yokosuka Naval District, assigned to Submarine Division 2 in Submarine Squadron 1 in the 6th Fleet In the autumn of 1941, she underwent conversion into a mother ship for a Type A midget submarine. The submarines I-16, I-20, I-22, and I-24 also underwent the conversion. By 15 November 1941, I-18 was a part of Submarine Division 3 — which also included I-19 and I-20 — in Submarine Squadron 1 in the 6th Fleet.

At the Kure Navy Club in Kure, Japan, on 17 November 1941, the commander of Submarine Division 3 briefed the commanding officers of the five converted submarines on the upcoming attack on Pearl Harbor and on the role of their submarines in it. He had been designated the commander of the Special Attack Unit, made up of all five submarines, each of which was to launch a Type A midget submarine off Pearl Harbor so that the midget submarines could participate in the attack. I-22 was to serve as flagship of the Special Attack unit.

On 18 November 1941, the five submarines moved from Kure to the Kamegakubi Naval Proving Ground, where each embarked a Type A midget submarine. At 02:15 on 19 November 1941, the five submarines got underway from Kamegakubi bound for the Hawaiian Islands, taking a direct route that took them south of Midway Atoll. While at sea, they received the message "Climb Mount Niitaka 1208" (Japanese: Niitakayama nobore 1208) from the Combined Fleet on 2 December 1941, indicating that war with the Allies would commence on 8 December 1941 Japan time, which was on 7 December 1941 on the other side of the International Date Line in Hawaii.

=== World War II ===
==== Pearl Harbor ====
At 02:15 on 7 December 1941, I-18 launched her midget submarine, No. 17, south of Oahu about 13 nautical miles (24 km; 15 mi) from the entrance to Pearl Harbor. No. 17 was depth charged and sunk with the loss of its two-man crew outside the harbor in Keehi Lagoon. Its wreck was discovered resting in 75 feet (23 m) of water on 13 June 1960, and the United States Navy submarine rescue ship USS Current refloated it on 6 July 1960, finding no human remains inside. At the request of the Government of Japan, the United States returned the wreck to Japan, where it is displayed at the Naval Academy Etajima in Etajima.

I-18 and the other four "mother" submarines proceeded to the planned recovery area for their midget submarines west of Lanai, where they spent the night of 7–8 December 1941. None of the midget submarines returned. Early on 9 December 1941, I-18, I-20, and I-24 received orders to leave the recovery area. I-18 departed the Hawaiian Islands on 12 December 1941 and arrived at Kwajalein on 22 December 1941.

==== First war patrol ====
On 4 January 1942, I-18, I-22, and I-24 departed Kwajalein to begin their first war patrol, assigned patrol areas off the Hawaiian Islands, with the commander of Submarine Division 2 embarked on I-18. I-18 sighted U.S. Navy Task Force 11, including the aircraft carrier USS Lexington, steaming 550 nautical miles (1,020 km; 630 mi) west of Hawaii on 9 January 1942, and on 10 January, while 130 nautical miles (240 km; 150 mi) northeast of Johnston Island, she sighted two SBD Dauntless dive bombers from Lexington flying west, allowing her to calculate Lexington′s approximate position and report it.

On 18 January 1942, I-18, I-22, and I-24 received orders to depart their patrol areas, the orders calling for I-18 and I-24 to make for the Northwestern Hawaiian Islands and bombard Midway Atoll. On 24 January 1942, I-18 conducted a periscope reconnaissance of Midway, and on 25 January 1942, the two submarines surfaced in darkness off Midway to begin their bombardment. I-24 opened fire with her 140-millimeter (5.5 in) deck gun, and United States Marine Corps coastal artillery promptly returned fire, forcing I-24 to submerge after firing only six rounds. I-18 also submerged without ever having opened fire on the atoll.

After the bombardment attempt, I-18 and I-24 as well as I-22 set course for Japan. Unknown to them, the U.S. submarine USS Gudgeon had received Ultra intelligence information alerting her to their activities and routes. She did not sight any of them, but while searching for them she encountered and sank the submarine I-73, which was following the same route, 240 nautical miles (440 km; 280 mi) west of Midway on 27 January 1942. I-18 arrived at Yokosuka along with I-22, I-24, and the submarines I-4, I-5, I-6, and I-7 on 2 February 1942.

==== February–April 1942 ====
After her port call at Yokosuka, I-18 moved to Kure, then departed Kure on 18 March 1942. She remained in Japan into April 1942.

During I-18′s stay in Japan, the German naval staff in Berlin formally requested on 27 March 1942 that Japan begin attacks on Allied convoys in the Indian Ocean. On 8 April 1942, the Japanese formally agreed to meet this request by dispatching submarines to operate off the coast of East Africa, and that day they withdrew Submarine Division 1 of Submarine Squadron 8 from its base at Kwajalein to Japan. By 16 April 1942 they had created the "A" detachment within Submarine Squadron 8, consisting of I-18 and the submarines I-10, I-16, I-20, and I-30, as well as midget submarines and the auxiliary cruisers Aikoku Maru and Hōkoku Maru, which were to operate as supply ships for the submarines. That morning, the commander of the 6th Fleet, Vice Admiral Teruhisa Komatsu, the commander of Submarine Squadron 8, their staffs, and the midget submarine crews paid a courtesy call on the commander-in-chief of the Combined Fleet, Admiral Isoroku Yamamoto, aboard his flagship, the battleship Yamato, at Hashirajima anchorage. After the visit with Yamamoto, the detachment got underway at 11:00, bound for Penang in Japanese-occupied British Malaya.

During the detachment's voyage, 16 United States Army Air Forces B-25 Mitchell bombers launched by the aircraft carrier USS Hornet struck targets on Honshu in the Doolittle Raid on 18 April 1942. The detachment received orders from the 6th Fleet that day to divert from its voyage and head northeast, passing north of the Bonin Islands, to intercept the U.S. Navy task force that had launched the strike. The detachment failed to find the U.S. ships and soon resumed its voyage.

I-30 and Aikoku Maru called at Penang from 20 April to 22 April 1942 before heading into the Indian Ocean to conduct an advance reconnaissance of the "A" Detachment's planned operating area. The rest of the "A" Detachment reached Penang on 27 April 1942, where the seaplane carrier Nisshin — which had undergone modifications allowing her to carry Type A midget submarines — rendezvoused with it. I-16, I-18, and I-20 each embarked a midget submarine at Penang.

==== Indian Ocean operation ====
I-18 and the other "A" detachment units got underway from Penang on 30 April 1942, headed westward into the Indian Ocean with I-10 serving as the detachment's flagship. The submarines refueled at sea from Aikoku Maru and Hōkoku Maru on 5, 10, and 15 May 1942. I-18 suffered a mishap on 17 May when her port diesel engine flooded in heavy seas and four of its cylinders seized, damage which prevented her from reaching the launch area for the midget submarines on schedule.

I-10′s Yokosuka E14Y1 (Allied reporting name "Glen") floatplane began reconnaissance flights over ports in South Africa by reconnoitering Durban on 20 May 1942, followed by flights over East London, Port Elizabeth, and Simon's Town over the next week. On the night of 29 May, the plane flew over Diego-Suarez, Madagascar, sighting the battleship HMS Ramillies among the ships anchored there. The "A" detachment commander selected Diego-Suarez as the target for a midget submarine attack, scheduled for 30 May 1942. I-16 and I-20 launched their midget submarines 10 nautical miles (19 km; 12 mi) off Diego-Suarez on 30 May, but I-18′s midget suffered engine failure and she could not launch it.

After the midget submarine attack, the "A" detachment began anti-shipping operations. I-18 sank the Norwegian 2,158-gross register ton merchant ship Wilford in the Mozambique Channel at 20°20′S 036°47′E on 8 June 1942, then jettisoned her midget submarine on 9 June. On 1 July 1942, she heavily damaged the Dutch 1,805-ton merchant ship De Weert, and De Weert sank on 3 July at 25°12′S 035°56′E.

On 2 July 1942, I-18 attacked the British 7,406-ton armed merchant ship Phemius. Her torpedoes detonated prematurely, and Phemius opened fire on I-18′s periscope. I-18 escaped undamaged. She was in the Indian Ocean south of St. Lucia Bay, South Africa, on 6 July 1942 when she torpedoed the 7,341-ton British India Steam Navigation Company steamer Mundra, which was carrying a large number of survivors of other ships. She then attacked Mundra with gunfire, sinking her at 28°45′S 032°20′E. One hundred fifty-five men survived Mundra′s sinking, which prompted a large number of Royal Air Force and South African Air Force sorties to find I-18, but I-18 went undetected.

I-18 conducted a reconnaissance of Rodrigues on 20 July and of Diego Garcia on 31 July 1942, then proceeded to Penang. As she neared Penang on 2 August 1942, she detected an unidentified enemy — probably Royal Navy — submarine stalking her, but she arrived at Penang safely later that day. She later set course for Japan, arriving at Yokosuka on 23 August 1942 to undergo an overhaul.

==== Guadalcanal campaign ====
By mid-November 1942, the Japanese had decided to organize a system of submarine supply runs to Guadalcanal in the Solomon Islands, where Japanese forces had been fighting in the Guadalcanal campaign since August 1942. With her overhaul complete, I-18 got underway from Kure on 17 December 1942 and, after a stop at Truk, proceeded to Shortland Island in the Shortland Islands to begin her supply runs. Early on the morning of 3 January 1943, the submarine USS Grayback sighted I-18 on the surface in the Solomon Sea southwest of Rendova at 08°49′S 157°09′E and launched a torpedo attack. Grayback′s torpedoes detonated, and Grayback′s commanding officer believed she had sunk I-18, but the torpedoes apparently exploded prematurely, because I-18 submerged and escaped unscathed.

I-18 made three supply runs to Guadalcanal, in each case dropping her cargo off at Cape Esperance on the island's northwest coast. She delivered 15 tons of cargo in supply drums on 5 January 1943 and 25 tons in supply drums on 11 January 1943. On 22 January 1943, she departed Truk on her last supply run, delivering 18 tons of cargo in a supply container at Cape Esperance on 26 January 1943.

On 28 January 1943, I-18 was attached to Submarine Force "A". She deployed to waters north of Rennell Island and south of Guadalcanal, where she formed a patrol line with the submarines I-11 — which served as the force's flagship — I-16, I-17, I-20, I-25, I-26, I-32, and I-176, targeting any Allied naval forces attempting to interfere with Operation Ke, the Japanese evacuation of their forces on Guadalcanal. On 2 February 1943, Submarine Force A received orders to intercept a U.S. Navy aircraft carrier task force 100 nautical miles (190 km; 120 mi) southeast of San Cristobal, but they failed to find the task force.

The Japanese completed Operation Ke on 8 February 1943. That day, Submarine Force A received orders to intercept a U.S. Navy force 150 nautical miles (280 km; 170 mi) south-southeast of Rennell Island. Two of the submarines, including I-18, found and engaged the American force before losing contact with it. Later that day, the commander of Submarine Force A ordered all its submarines except for I-11 and I-17 to proceed to Truk.

==== Loss ====
On 11 February 1943, I-18 reported sighting an American task force in the Coral Sea 200 nautical miles (370 km; 230 mi) south of San Cristobal. An OS2U Kingfisher floatplane of Cruiser Scouting Squadron 9 (VCS-9) from the light cruiser USS Helena sighted her about 9 nautical miles (17 km; 10 mi) from the task force, dropped a smoke marker to indicate her location, and summoned the destroyer USS Fletcher. Fletcher gained sonar contact on I-18 directly ahead at a range of 2,900 yards (2,700 m) and dropped depth charges at 15:27. At 15:39, she saw a large bubble of oil and air reach the surface, and she heard a heavy explosion at 15:43. She dropped three more depth charges in the center of the oil slick. After 15:46, she saw cork, wood, and other wreckage rise to the surface in what had become a very large oil slick. It marked the end of I-18, sunk with the loss of all 102 men on board at 14°15′S 161°53′E.

The Japanese declared I-18 missing on the day she was sunk. She was struck from the Navy list on 1 April 1943.

After World War II, the U.S. Joint Army-Navy Assessment Committee identified the submarine Fletcher sank on 11 February 1943 as Ro-102. However, Ro-102 conducted patrols from Rabaul after 11 February and reported to Rabaul until 9 May 1943.
