= USS Gilmer (DD-233) =

Clemson-class destroyer

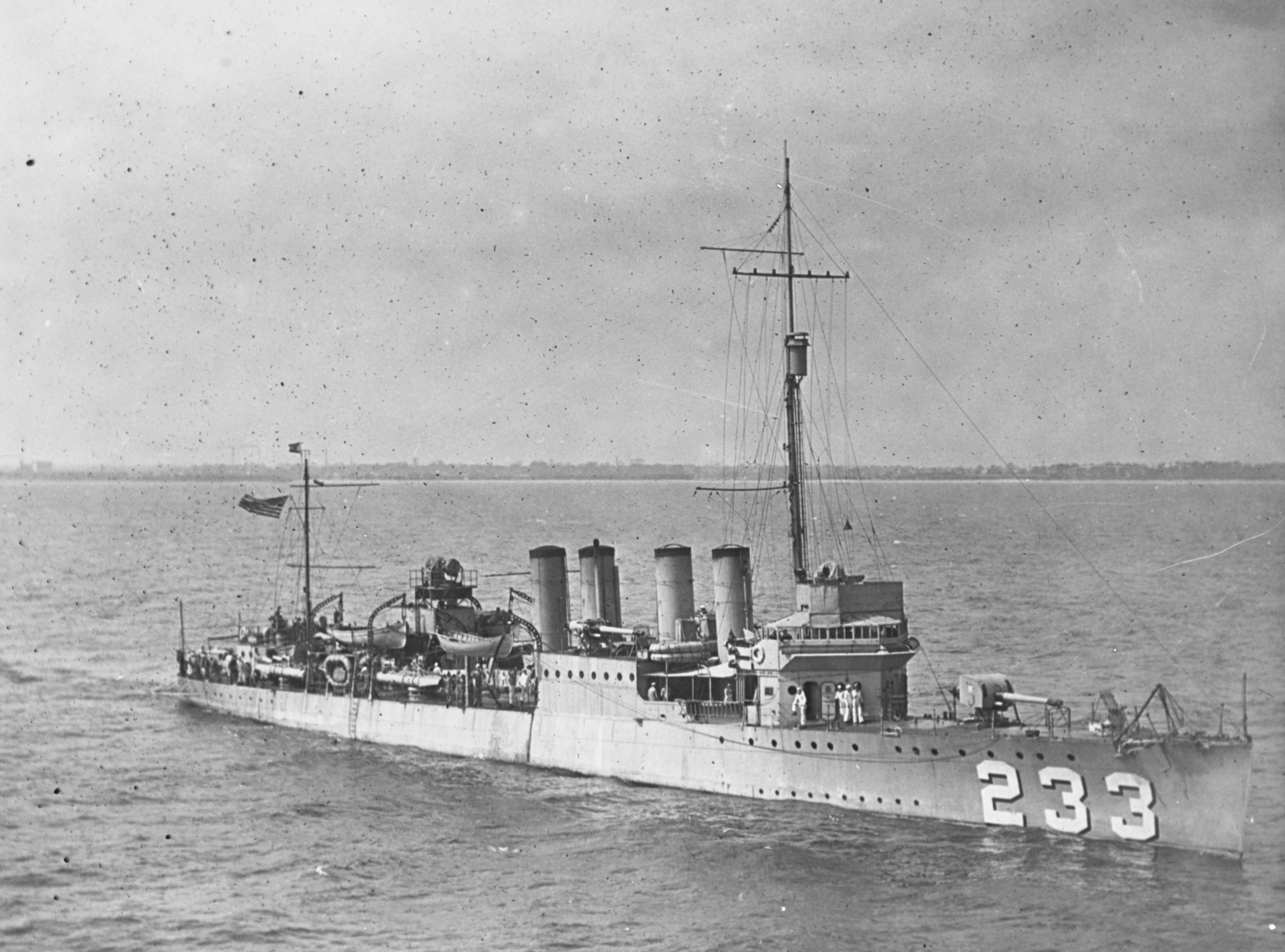
- USS Gilmer in 1922

History

United States
- Namesake: Thomas Walker Gilmer
- Builder: New York Shipbuilding
- Laid down: 25 June 1918
- Launched: 24 May 1919
- Commissioned: 30 April 1920
- Decommissioned: 31 August 1938
- Recommissioned: 25 September 1939
- Reclassified: High-speed transport, APD-11, 22 January 1943
- Decommissioned: 5 February 1946
- Stricken: 25 February 1946
- Honors and awards: Seven battle stars for World War II
- Fate: Sold for scrapping 3 December 1946

General characteristics
- Class & type: Variant of Clemson-class destroyer
- Displacement: 1,215 tons
- Length: 314 feet 4 inches (95.81 m)
- Beam: 31 feet 8 inches (9.65 m)
- Draft: 9 feet 10 inches (3.00 m)
- Propulsion: 26,500 shp (20 MW); geared turbines, 2 screws
- Speed: 33.2 knots (61 km/h)
- Range: 4,900 nm @ 15 kn (9,100 km at 28 km/h)
- Complement: 130 officers and enlisted
- Armament: 4 x 5 in (130 mm), 1 x 3 in (76 mm), 12 x 21 inch (533 mm) tt.

USS Gilmer (DD-233/APD-11) was a Clemson-class destroyer in the United States Navy during World War II. She was the first ship named for Secretary of the Navy Thomas Walker Gilmer.

== Construction and commissioning ==
Gilmer was launched 24 May 1919 by the New York Shipbuilding Corporation; sponsored by Mrs. Elizabeth Gilmer Miles, Secretary Gilmer's granddaughter; and commissioned 30 April 1920.

== Service history ==
From 27 August 1920 to 11 August 1923, Gilmer made two round trip transatlantic voyages out of New York to European and Mediterranean ports. Gilmer was damaged in a storm in the Adriatic Sea in November 1920. She struck a submerged object 3 February 1921 and was forced to enter dry dock in Pola, Italy (now Pula, Croatia) for repairs to her starboard propeller and shaft. She subsequently engaged in training exercises along the United States East Coast, in the Caribbean, and out of United States West Coast ports until 1938. This varied duty was highlighted by a cruise to Nicaragua in 1926 to protect American lives and property during the guerrilla war led by Augusto César Sandino, an escort voyage to Havana guarding President Calvin Coolidge in Texas in 1928, and disaster relief work in the Caribbean during the same year.

Decommissioned at Philadelphia 31 August 1938, Gilmer recommissioned 25 September 1939 following the outbreak of World War II and was assigned as flagship of Destroyer Squadron 30 in the Atlantic Squadron. She was part of the Thirteenth Naval District in 1940. She conducted patrols and exercises in the Atlantic and Caribbean until reaching San Diego 4 November 1940 and continued these duties along the Pacific coast until the United States entered the war.

=== World War II ===
Gilmer was at sea off Puget Sound when the Japanese attacked Pearl Harbor on 7 December 1941. She immediately began antisubmarine patrol and escort duties. In early June 1942, she took part in the opening stages of the Aleutian Islands campaign. She entered drydock 13 November 1942. She was redesignated as a high-speed transport, APD-11, on 22 January 1943 following conversion. She sailed from Seattle 29 January via San Diego for Pearl Harbor, arriving 13 February, and subsequently escorted merchantmen to Espiritu Santo, where she moored 9 March and commenced amphibious training exercises with the 4th Marine Raiders Battalion.

On 5 April, Gilmer sailed from Tulagi and as flagship of Transport Division 16 engaged in antisubmarine patrols in those waters. She called at Nouméa 22 April, and put in at Townsville, Australia, 8 May, making two round trip escort voyages thence to Brisbane 13 May-22 June 1943. Escort and patrolling from Australia to New Guinea continued until 4 September 1943, when Gilmer participated in the Allied assault on the Huon Peninsula near Lae, New Guinea, and patrolled off Buna, New Guinea. She supported American and Australian forces in the New Guinea campaign, and made frequent escort voyages thence to Australia and return. On 26 December 1943, she landed troops of the 1st Marine Division at Cape Gloucester, New Britain, and stood by to support landings at Finschhafen 3 days later. On 2 January 1944, elements of the 126th Infantry were landed at Saidon. Gilmer engaged in patrols of Buna, Cape Sudest, and Australia and bombarded Humboldt Bay, New Guinea, 22 April 1944 when Army forces began the assault.

On 12 May the ship sailed from Hollandia to embark underwater demolition teams (UDT) at Pearl Harbor and debarked them 14 June 1944 at the initial assault on Saipan. Two days later she discovered and sank four Japanese cargo ships, taking 24 prisoners, escaping serious damage. Tinian Town was bombarded 23 June and UDT operations off that island continued until 14 July when Gilmer, along with William C. Miller, formed an offensive antisubmarine warfare group and sank I-55 in 18°18′N 146°26′E. DANFS listed this submarine as I-6, but I-6 is believed to have been lost to friendly fire at the end of June 1944.

Gilmer sailed from Tinian 12 August for Pearl Harbor and until January 1945 conducted demolition and reconnaissance training with UDT teams in Hawaiian waters. She sailed 10 January as flagship for rehearsal exercises at Ulithi, and on 16 February closed Iwo Jima for the initial amphibious assaults. UDT teams were landed on the eastern and western beaches, and Gilmer screened Tennessee as the big ship bombarded Japanese defenses on Iwo Jima. Patrolling and screening activities continued through 24 February, when Gilmer sailed for Leyte, arriving four days later. After touching Ulithi, she took part in the Okinawa operation, closing that island 25 March 1945 as flagship of the UDT's. The next day, a kamikaze hit her galley deckhouse, killing one and wounding three crewmen. Gilmer supported the invasion until 9 April when she sailed for repairs at Pearl Harbor, but returned to Okinawa 4 July to recommence patrolling duties.

Following antisubmarine screening assignments for convoys bound from the Philippines to Okinawa, Gilmer moored at Nagasaki 13 September after Japan's surrender to carry prisoners of war from there to Okinawa. She sailed from that island 15 October to escort a convoy to Hong Kong, arriving 22 October, and sailed again 2 days later to escort troopships carrying the Chinese 13th Army to Qinhuangdao. After further escort and patrol voyages along the China coast, Gilmer sailed from Qingdao 26 November for the United States and finally moored in the U.S. again at Philadelphia 11 January 1946.

=== Fate ===
Decommissioned 5 February 1946, her name was struck from the Navy list 25 February 1946. She was sold for scrapping 3 December 1946.

== Awards ==
Gilmer received seven battle stars for World War II service. Awarded a Navy Unit Commendation for participating in seven specific operations during World War II. Gilmer received the Second Nicaraguan Campaign Medal for service 25 September-7 October 1926 and 11-30 October 1926.
