= USS Reynolds =

US navy ship 1943–1945

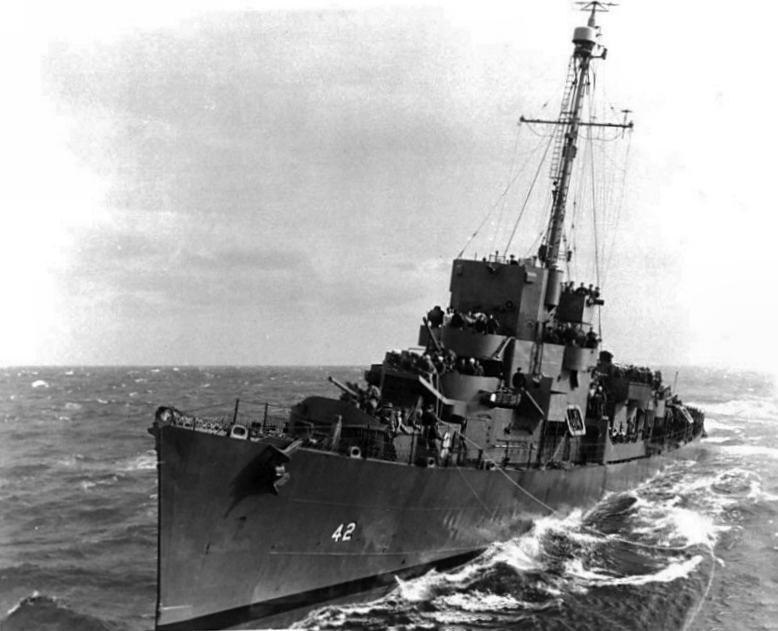
- Reynolds underway, c. 20 February 1945

History

United States
- Name: USS Reynolds
- Builder: Puget Sound Navy Yard
- Laid down: 12 January 1943, as BDE-42 for the United Kingdom
- Launched: 1 August 1943
- Commissioned: 1 November 1943
- Decommissioned: 5 December 1945
- Renamed: USS Reynolds, 23 June 1943
- Stricken: 19 December 1945
- Honors and awards: 8 battle stars (World War II)
- Fate: Sold for scrapping, 28 April 1947

General characteristics
- Type: Evarts-class destroyer escort
- Displacement: 1,140 long tons (1,158 t) standard; 1,430 long tons (1,453 t) full
- Length: 289 ft 5 in (88.21 m) o/a; 283 ft 6 in (86.41 m) w/l
- Beam: 35 ft 2 in (10.72 m)
- Draft: 11 ft (3.4 m) (max)
- Propulsion: 4 × General Motors Model 16-278A diesel engines with electric drive, 6,000 shp (4,474 kW); 2 screws
- Speed: 19 knots (35 km/h; 22 mph)
- Range: 4,150 nmi (7,690 km)
- Complement: 15 officers and 183 enlisted
- Armament: 3 × single 3"/50 Mk.22 dual-purpose guns; 1 × quad 1.1"/75 Mk.2 AA gun; 9 × 20 mm Mk.4 AA guns; 1 × Hedgehog Projector Mk.10 (144 rounds); 8 × Mk.6 depth charge projectors; 2 × Mk.9 depth charge tracks

USS Reynolds (DE-42) was an Evarts-class destroyer escort constructed for the United States Navy during World War II. She was sent off into the Pacific Ocean to protect convoys and other ships from Japanese submarines and fighter aircraft. She performed escort and antisubmarine operations in dangerous battle areas and was awarded eight battle stars, a very high number for a ship of her type.

== Design ==
The Evarts-class destroyer escorts were 289 ft 5 in (88.21 m) long overall, and they had a beam of 35 ft 2 in (10.72 m). They had an average draft of 10 ft 1 in (3.07 m) at their full load displacement of 1,416 long tons (1,439 t). Each ship had a normal crew numbered 156 officers and sailors.

Reynolds was propelled by a pair of diesel motors manufactured by General Motors, which drove a pair of screw propellers. Her propulsion system was rated to produce 6,000 brake horsepower (4,500 kW) for a top speed of 19.5 knots (36.1 km/h; 22.4 mph). Oil storage amounted to between 131 and 197 long tons (133 and 200 t), which allowed a cruising radius of up to 6,000 nautical miles (11,000 km; 6,900 mi) at an economical pace of 10 knots (19 km/h; 12 mph).

The ship's armament consisted of a main battery of three 3-inch (76 mm) /50-caliber guns in individual pivot mounts, which could be used against air or surface targets. These were supported by a light anti-aircraft battery that initially consisted of four 1.1 in (28 mm) /75-caliber guns in a quadruple mount and nine 20 mm (0.79 in) Oerlikon guns. For attacks against submarines, the ship was equipped with a Hedgehog mortar, eight depth charge throwers, and two depth charge racks.

== Service history ==
She was originally assigned to the United Kingdom and was laid down on 12 January 1943 as BDE-42 by the Puget Sound Navy Yard, Bremerton, Washington. Reallocated to US Navy, the ship was renamed Reynolds after Dudley Reynolds , a naval officer killed aboard USS Pensacola at the Battle of Tassafaronga. The ship was commissioned on 1 November 1943.

Following shakedown off southern California, Reynolds departed the West Coast on 13 January 1944 and steamed to Pearl Harbor. Further training followed and on 27 January she sailed west in the screen of White Plains (CVE-66) then ferrying replacement aircraft to forward areas. Arriving at Majuro on 4 February, she accompanied White Plains to Kwajalein, then back to Majuro, whence they steamed via Makin to Pearl Harbor, arriving on 23 February. Reynolds then operated under Commander, Submarine Training Force, into May and, after conducting an ASW demonstration for Australian observers, she resumed oceanic escort duties with a run to Eniwetok. Arriving 20 June, she joined TG 12.2, a hunter-killer group, and on 28 July assisted Wyman (DE-38) in sinking RO 48.

Detached from hunter-killer duty on 9 August, Reynolds returned to Pearl Harbor. Departing again on 20 August as a unit of TU 31.4.4, the Western Garrison Force for the Palau operation, she arrived at Kossol Passage on 20 September and, until 5 October, remained in the area, patrolling the northern entrance to the passage. Between 5 October and 14 November, she escorted ships between Manus and Purvis Bay, then proceeded to Ulithi where she joined TG 30.8 on the 17th. Operating primarily with that group for the remainder of the war, she screened the auxiliaries as they replenished the task groups of TF 38/58 off the Philippines, Formosa, Iwo Jima, and Okinawa.

After the cessation of Pacific hostilities, Reynolds continued to screen the logistic ships. Detached on 4 September she proceeded to Tokyo Bay. There until the 7th, she screened refueling operations for TF 16, then steamed via Ulithi for the United States and inactivation. Arriving at San Francisco, California, in mid-October, Reynolds decommissioned at Mare Island, California, on 5 December 1945. Struck from the Navy List on 19 December 1945, she was sold and delivered to Mr. John L. Key, San Francisco, on 28 April 1947.

== Awards ==
- Combat Action Ribbon (retroactive)
- American Campaign Medal
- Asiatic–Pacific Campaign Medal (with eight service stars)
- World War II Victory Medal
