= USS William C. Miller =

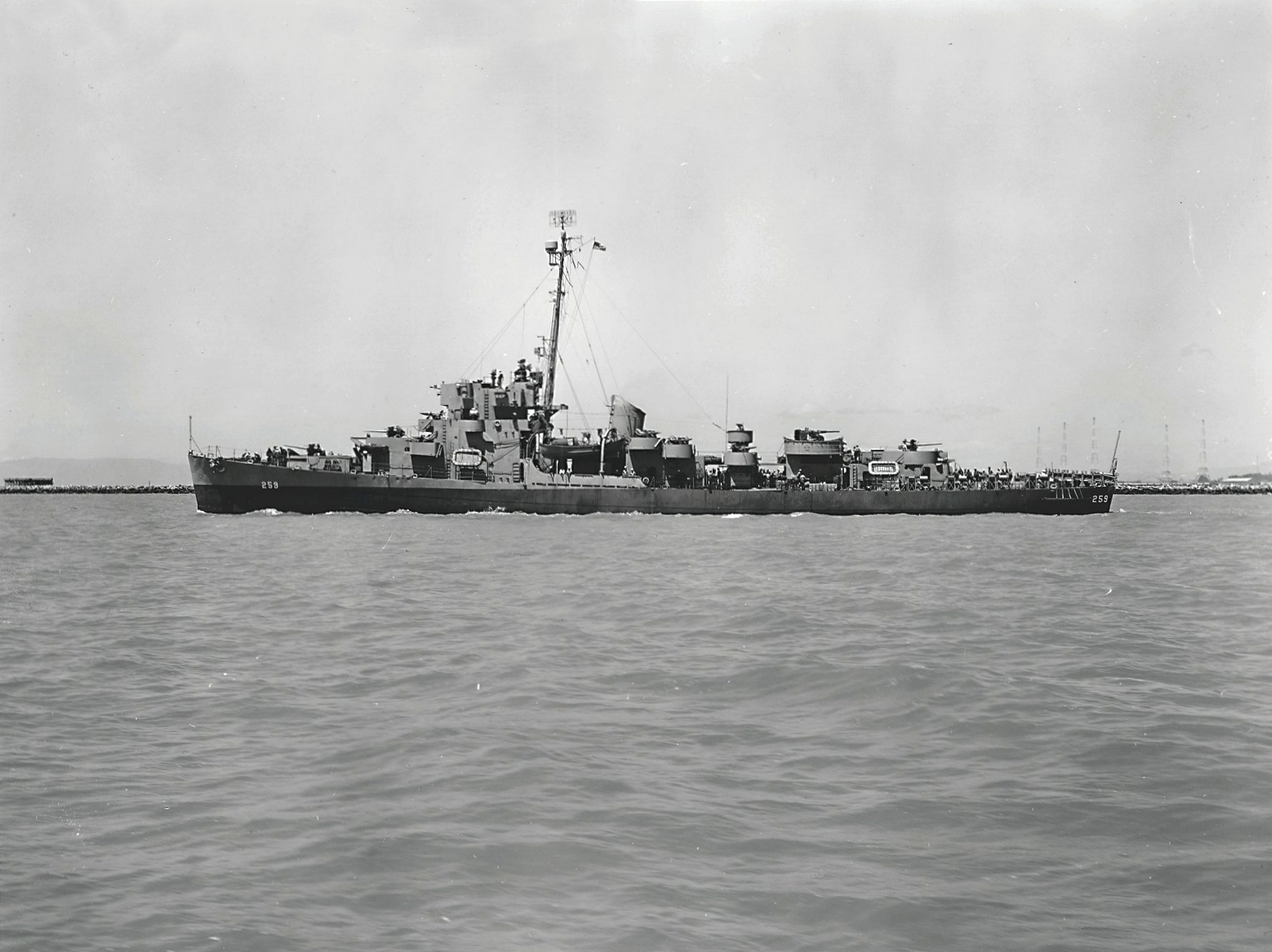
- William C. Miller on 15 May 1945

History

United States
- Name: USS William C. Miller
- Builder: Boston Navy Yard
- Laid down: 10 January 1943
- Launched: 22 February 1943
- Commissioned: 2 July 1943
- Decommissioned: 17 December 1945
- Stricken: 8 January 1946
- Honors and awards: 7 battle stars (World War II)
- Fate: Sold for scrapping, 10 April 1947

General characteristics
- Type: Evarts-class destroyer escort
- Displacement: 1,140 long tons (1,158 t) standard; 1,430 long tons (1,453 t) full
- Length: 289 ft 5 in (88.21 m) o/a; 283 ft 6 in (86.41 m) w/l
- Beam: 35 ft 2 in (10.72 m)
- Draft: 11 ft (3.4 m) (max)
- Propulsion: 4 × General Motors Model 16-278A diesel engines with electric drive, 6,000 shp (4,474 kW); 2 screws
- Speed: 19 knots (35 km/h; 22 mph)
- Range: 4,150 nmi (7,690 km)
- Complement: 15 officers and 183 enlisted
- Armament: 3 × single 3"/50 Mk.22 dual purpose guns; 1 × quad 1.1"/75 Mk.2 AA gun; 9 × 20 mm Mk.4 AA guns; 1 × Hedgehog Projector Mk.10 (144 rounds); 8 × Mk.6 depth charge projectors; 2 × Mk.9 depth charge tracks

USS William C. Miller (DE-259) was an Evarts-class destroyer escort constructed for the United States Navy during World War II. She was sent off into the Pacific Ocean to protect convoys and other ships from Japanese submarines and fighter aircraft. She performed escort and anti-submarine operations in dangerous battle areas and returned home with seven battle stars, a very high number for a ship of her type.

== Design ==
The Evarts-class destroyer escorts were 289 ft 5 in (88.21 m) long overall, and they had a beam of 35 ft 2 in (10.72 m). They had an average draft of 10 ft 1 in (3.07 m) at their full load displacement of 1,416 long tons (1,439 t). Each ship had a normal crew numbered 156 officers and sailors.

William C. Miller was propelled by a pair of diesel motors manufactured by General Motors, which drove a pair of screw propellers. Her propulsion system was rated to produce 6,000 brake horsepower (4,500 kW) for a top speed of 19.5 knots (36.1 km/h; 22.4 mph). Oil storage amounted to between 131 and 197 long tons (133 and 200 t), which allowed a cruising radius of up to 6,000 nautical miles (11,000 km; 6,900 mi) at an economical pace of 10 knots (19 km/h; 12 mph).

The ship's armament consisted of a main battery of three 3-inch (76 mm) /50-caliber guns in individual pivot mounts, which could be used against air or surface targets. These were supported by a light anti-aircraft battery that initially consisted of four 1.1 in (28 mm) /75-caliber guns in a quadruple mount and nine 20 mm (0.79 in) Oerlikon guns. For attacks against submarines, the ship was equipped with a Hedgehog mortar, eight depth charge throwers, and two depth charge racks.

== Service history ==
She was laid down on 10 January 1943 at Boston, Massachusetts, by the Boston Navy Yard. The ship was named for William Miller, a naval aviator killed during the attack on Pearl Harbor. Miller was launched on 22 February 1943, and was sponsored by the mother of the vessel's namesake. The ship was commissioned on 2 July 1943.

William C. Miller got underway on 19 July, bound for Bermuda. There, she conducted her shakedown before returning to Boston for post-shakedown availability and remained in the navy yard until 27 August, when she sailed for Panama. After transiting the Panama Canal between 1 and 3 September, the destroyer escort arrived at San Diego, California, on the 12th and shifted to San Francisco, California, on the 15th, before sailing for Hawaii nine days later in the screen for Convoy 4796. She returned to the west coast early in the fall but departed San Francisco on 19 October, bound for the Gilbert Islands and "Operation Galvanic".

As a unit of Task Group (TG) 54.9, 5th Fleet, William C. Miller screened the ships of the Tarawa garrison group and patrolled in area "Longsuit" off the invasion beaches into early December. She then guarded the entrance to the lagoon at Tarawa through the middle of the month before departing the Gilberts on Christmas Eve, bound for the Hawaiian Islands. Reaching Pearl Harbor on 30 December 1943, William C. Miller underwent upkeep alongside the destroyer tender Black Hawk (AD-9) and remained in Hawaiian waters into February 1944. That year was to prove a busy one for the destroyer escort. She earned the other six of her seven battle stars in the next year and one-half operating on screening, escorting, and hunter-killer duties with convoys for the remainder of 1944. During that period, William C. Miller supported the occupation of Kwajalein and Majuro from 29 January to 8 February 1944; the capture of Eniwetok from 17 February to 2 March

=== Marianas campaign ===
The Marianas campaign followed, beginning with the battle of Saipan from 26 June to 10 August, along with the battle of Tinian from 24 July to 10 August. At 21:20 on the evening of 13 July, a patrol plane sighted a Japanese submarine submerging some 78 miles from Rorpgattan Point, Saipan, and reported the enemy's position. Accordingly, William C. Miller and the other members of a hunter-killer group – Gilmer (APD-11) carrying the officer in tactical command (OTC) – altered course and departed the screen for the transport area to track the submersible. At 0022 on the following day, the destroyer escort and her sisters arrived on the scene and commenced searching. Seven hours later, William C. Miller obtained sound contact at a range of 1,700 yards (1,600 m). The destroyer escort approached at 15 knots and dropped a 13-charge pattern at 0726. Opening the range after observing no damage, the escort vessel attacked for the second time, dropping a second pattern at 0752, once again, of 13 charges. That pattern appears to have proved devastating to I-6. At 0804, William C. Miller noted pieces of wood popping to the surface about 500 yards (460 m) ahead, one point on the starboard bow.

One minute later, a "heavy and prolonged underwater explosion" – estimated to be about three times the shock of a depth charge explosion – shook the ship. Shortly thereafter, observers in William C. Miller noted a large "boil" in the water some 50 yards (46 m) in diameter. At 0806, the destroyer escort laid a third 13-charge pattern that apparently landed atop the submarine, completing whatever devastation had been wreaked by the second salvo. William C. Miller closed the oil slick and debris and lowered a boat to investigate. The ship soon recovered small pieces of cork insulating material; fractured wooden decking; and a fur-lined, Japanese seaman's cap. The depth charge barrage had literally torn the submarine apart. A postwar accounting credited William C. Miller with the destruction of the Japanese submarine I-6. The Navy, in what seems to be in error gave credit to William C. Miller for sinking the I-6, but due to recent research information presented by "combinedfleet.com", it seems to have been the I-55. I-6 was sunk in a collision with the freighter Toyokawa Maru on 16 June 1944

After the completion of the Tinian campaign, William C. Miller departed that island on 21 August in company with Indianapolis (CA-35). The destroyer escort paused briefly at Eniwetok, in the Marshalls, on the 24th before she pushed on for the Hawaiian Islands, arriving at Pearl Harbor on 2 September. William C. Miller returned to Eniwetok at the end of October and then shifted to Ulithi, in the Carolines, where she picked up Ulithi-to-Eniwetok Convoy Number 19 on 5 November. After bringing that convoy safely into port five days later, William C. Miller departed the Marshall Islands on 13 November with Eniwetok-to-Pearl Harbor Convoy Number 21. Making port at Pearl Harbor on 24 November, the destroyer escort underwent ordnance repairs at the Pearl Harbor Navy Yard into the following year.

=== Iwo Jima and the end of the war ===
William, C. Miller sortied from Pearl Harbor on 6 February 1945, as part of Task Unit (TU) 51.6.2 to participate in the assault and occupation of Iwo Jima between 23 February and 16 March. She returned to Pearl Harbor in early April, via Guam and Eniwetok. The destroyer escort subsequently steamed back to the west coast and remained there, first at San Francisco and then at San Diego, until 13 June when she sailed for the Hawaiian Islands in company with Cabana (DE-260). After arriving at Pearl Harbor on 19 June, William C. Miller escorted a convoy to Eniwetok which she reached on 6 July. She soon put to sea to operate in the screen of 3rd Fleet units in their operations against the Japanese home islands. She performed those duties into mid-August when hostilities with Japan ceased.

William C. Miller arrived at Ulithi on 19 August but soon sailed for Tokyo Bay as part of the initial occupation forces. She arrived at Tokyo Bay on 26 August and was anchored in view of the USS Missouri, the site of the formal Japanese surrender. On the morning of 2 September prior to the formal ceremony, the William C. Miller was ordered to relinquish her position for a flag officer’s ship and to depart Tokyo Bay to resume screening operations. Later that month, the destroyer escort headed home, via Ulithi, Eniwetok, and Pearl Harbor, and reached San Francisco, California, on 17 October. William C. Miller was decommissioned at the Mare Island Naval Shipyard on 21 December and stripped of all usable equipment. On 8 January 1946, William C. Miller was struck from the Navy List. Sold to Mr. Fred Perry of New York City on 10 April 1947, her hulk was subsequently scrapped on 19 November 1947.

== Awards ==
William C. Miller received seven battle stars for her World War II service.
