= Akui (name) =

Akui is both a given name and a surname. Notable people with the name include:

- Akui N'dekre Elie Moises (born 1992), Ivorian footballer
- David Akui (1920–1987), American soldier
- Seigo Yuri Akui (born 1995), Japanese boxer
