= Japanese submarine I-24 (1939) =

Type C cruiser submarine

- I-24 off Sasebo upon commissioning, 31 October 1941

History

Empire of Japan
- Name: Submarine No. 48
- Builder: Sasebo Naval Arsenal, Sasebo
- Laid down: 5 December 1938
- Renamed: I-24 on 30 September 1939
- Launched: 12 November 1939
- Completed: 31 October 1941
- Commissioned: 31 October 1941
- Fate: Sunk 11 June 1943
- Stricken: 1 August 1943

General characteristics
- Class & type: Type C submarine
- Displacement: 2,595 tonnes (2,554 long tons) surfaced; 3,618 tonnes (3,561 long tons) submerged
- Length: 109.3 m (358 ft 7 in) overall
- Beam: 9.1 m (29 ft 10 in)
- Draft: 5.3 m (17 ft 5 in)
- Installed power: 12,400 bhp (9,200 kW) (diesel); 2,000 hp (1,500 kW) (electric motor)
- Propulsion: Diesel-electric; 1 × diesel engine; 1 × electric motor
- Speed: 23.5 knots (43.5 km/h; 27.0 mph) surfaced; 8 knots (15 km/h; 9.2 mph) submerged
- Range: 14,000 nmi (26,000 km; 16,000 mi) at 16 knots (30 km/h; 18 mph) surfaced; 60 nmi (110 km; 69 mi) at 3 knots (5.6 km/h; 3.5 mph) submerged
- Test depth: 100 m (330 ft)
- Crew: 95
- Armament: 8 × bow 533 mm (21 in) torpedo tubes; 1 × 14 cm (5.5 in) deck gun; 2 × single or twin 25 mm (1 in) Type 96 anti-aircraft guns
- Notes: Fitted to carry 1 × Type A midget submarine

I-24 (伊24) was the fifth Type C cruiser submarines built for the Imperial Japanese Navy. During World War II, she operated as the mother ship for a midget submarine during the attack on Pearl Harbor and the attack on Sydney Harbour, supported Japanese forces during the Battle of the Coral Sea and the Battle of the Santa Cruz Islands, and served in the Guadalcanal campaign, New Guinea campaign, and Aleutian Islands campaign. She was sunk in June 1943.

== Design and description ==
The Type C submarines were derived from the earlier Kaidai-type VI with a heavier torpedo armament for long-range attacks. They displaced 2,595 tonnes (2,554 long tons) surfaced and 3,618 tonnes (3,561 long tons) submerged. The submarines were 109.3 meters (358 ft 7 in) long, had a beam of 9.1 meters (29 ft 10 in) and a draft of 5.3 meters (17 ft 5 in). They had a diving depth of 100 meters (330 ft).

For surface running, the boats were powered by two 6,200-brake-horsepower (4,623 kW) diesel engines, each driving one propeller shaft. When submerged each propeller was driven by a 1,000-horsepower (746 kW) electric motor. They could reach 23.6 knots (43.7 km/h; 27.2 mph) on the surface and 8 knots (15 km/h; 9.2 mph) underwater. On the surface, the C1s had a range of 14,000 nautical miles (26,000 km; 16,000 mi) at 16 knots (30 km/h; 18 mph); submerged, they had a range of 60 nmi (110 km; 69 mi) at 3 knots (5.6 km/h; 3.5 mph).

The boats were armed with eight internal bow 53.3 cm (21.0 in) torpedo tubes and carried a total of 20 torpedoes. They were also armed with a single 140 mm (5.5 in)/40 deck gun and two single or twin mounts for 25 mm (1 in) Type 96 anti-aircraft guns. They were equipped to carry one Type A midget submarine aft of the conning tower.

== Construction and commissioning ==
Ordered under the 3rd Naval Armaments Supplement Programme and built by the Sasebo Naval Arsenal at Sasebo, Japan, I-24 was laid down on 5 December 1938 with the name Submarine No. 48. While she was on the building ways, she was renamed I-24 on 30 September 1939, the second submarine of that number, the first I-24 having been renumbered I-124 on 1 June 1938 to make the number I-24 available for her. She was launched on 12 November 1939 and was completed and commissioned on 31 October 1941.

== Service history ==
=== Pre-World War II ===
Upon commissioning, I-24 was attached to the Yokosuka Naval District. She soon underwent conversion into a mother ship for a Type A midget submarine; the conversion work was completed on 10 November 1941. The submarines I-16, I-18, I-20, and I-22 also underwent the conversion. By 15 November 1941, I-24 was a part of Submarine Division 3 in Submarine Squadron 1 in the 6th Fleet.

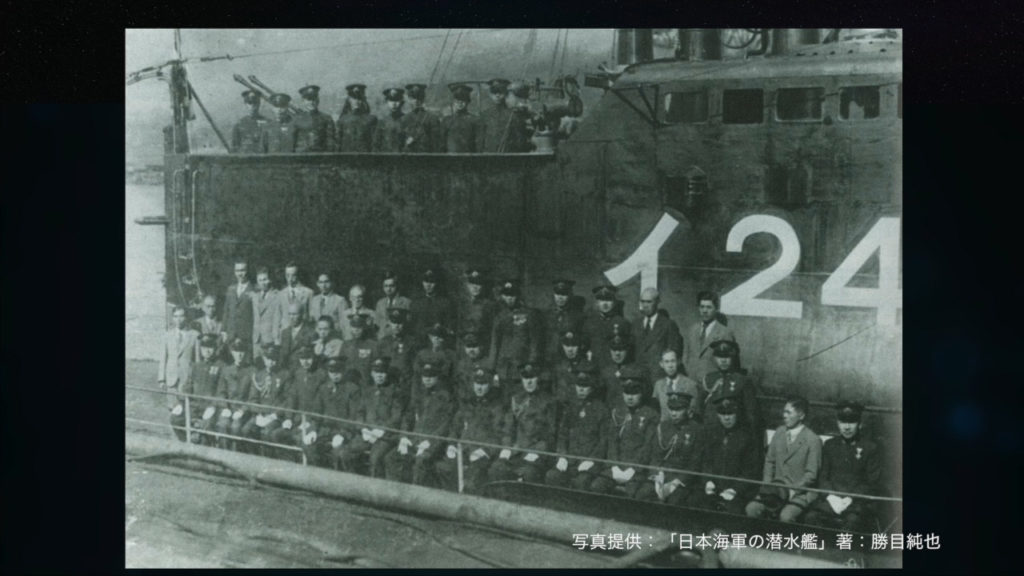
I-24's crew posing for a photo by her conning tower

At the Kure Navy Club in Kure, Japan, on 17 November 1941, the commander of Submarine Division 3 briefed the commanding officers of the five converted submarines on the upcoming attack on Pearl Harbor and on the role of their submarines in it. He had been designated the commander of the Special Attack Unit, made up of all five submarines, each of which was to launch a Type A midget submarine off Pearl Harbor so that the midget submarines could participate in the attack. I-22 was to serve as flagship of the Special Attack unit.

On 18 November 1941, the five submarines moved from Kure to the Kamegakubi Naval Proving Ground (34.1115° N, 132.5886° E), where each embarked a Type A midget submarine. At 02:15 on 19 November 1941, the five submarines got underway from Kamegakubi bound for the Hawaiian Islands, taking a direct route that took them south of Midway Atoll. While at sea, they received the message "Climb Mount Niitaka 1208" (Japanese: Niitakayama nobore 1208) from the Combined Fleet on 2 December 1941, indicating that war with the Allies would commence on 8 December 1941 Japan time, which was on 7 December 1941 on the other side of the International Date Line in Hawaii.

=== World War II ===
==== Pearl Harbor ====
At 03:33 on 7 December 1941, I-24 launched her midget submarine, No. 19, 10.5 nautical miles (19.4 km; 12.1 mi) west-southwest of the entrance to Pearl Harbor. No. 19 began to broach after I-24 launched her, but her two-man crew got her back under control.

No. 19 reached the entrance of the harbor at 07:00, but was unable to enter before the air strike began. No. 19 surfaced at around 08:00 and ran aground on a reef, where the United States Navy destroyer USS Helm sighted her. Helm opened fire, her shells missing but blowing No. 19 free of the reef. The concussion disabled No. 19′s torpedo firing mechanism and knocked her commander, Ensign Kazuo Sakamaki, unconscious. After Sakamaki regained consciousness, No. 19 again ran aground. Her two-man crew shifted her ballast and refloated her, but after that No. 19 would not answer the helm. While drifting, No 19 survived several depth charge attacks. Her crew tried to beach her, but she ran aground again on a reef. Sakamaki lit the fuses of No. 19′s self-destruct charges, which did not explode, and both men abandoned ship. Knocked unconscious in the surf, Sakamaki washed ashore at Waimanalo Beach on the east coast of Oahu on 8 December 1941 and was captured, becoming the first Japanese prisoner-of-war of World War II. His crewman drowned, but No. 19 was captured and in 1991 went on display in the United States at the National Museum of the Pacific War in Fredericksburg, Texas.

I-24 and the other four "mother" submarines proceeded to the planned recovery area for their midget submarines west of Lanai, where they spent the night of 7–8 December 1941. None of the midget submarines returned. Early on 9 December 1941, I-18, I-20, and I-24 received orders to leave the recovery area. The remainder of I-24′s patrol was uneventful, and she concluded it with her arrival at Kwajalein.

==== First war patrol ====
On 4 January 1942, I-18, I-22, and I-24 departed Kwajalein to begin their first war patrols, assigned patrol areas off the Hawaiian Islands. On 18 January 1942, they departed their patrol areas, and I-18 and I-24 received orders to bombard Midway Atoll in the Northwestern Hawaiian Islands. On 25 January 1942, the two submarines surfaced in darkness off Midway and I-24 opened fire with her 140-millimeter (5.5 in) deck gun. United States Marine Corps coastal artillery promptly returned fire, forcing I-24 to submerge after firing only six rounds. I-18 also submerged without ever having opened fire on the atoll.

After the bombardment attempt, I-24 as well as I-18 and I-22 set course for Japan. Unknown to them, the U.S. submarine USS Gudgeon had received Ultra intelligence information alerting her to their activities and routes. She did not sight any of them, but while searching for them she encountered and sank the submarine I-73, which was following the same route, 240 nautical miles (440 km; 280 mi) west of Midway on 27 January 1942. I-24 arrived at Yokosuka along with I-18, I-22, and the submarines I-4, I-5, I-6, and I-7 on 2 February 1942.

==== February–April 1942 ====
While I-24 was in Japan, she and the other 10 submarines of Submarine Squadron 8 conducted extensive exercises in the Seto Inland Sea, which they completed on 11 April 1942. By that date, I-24 was assigned to Submarine Division 3 with I-21 and I-22, which together with Submarine Division 14 — consisting of I-27, I-28, and I-29 — made up the Eastern Advanced Detachment, which was under the overall command of Submarine Division 3's commander.

On 15 April 1942, I-24 got underway from Kure bound for Truk along with the other submarines of the detachment. During their voyage, 16 United States Army Air Forces B-25 Mitchell bombers launched by the aircraft carrier USS Hornet struck targets on Honshu in the Doolittle Raid on 18 April 1942. The detachment received orders that day to divert from its voyage and head east-northeast at flank speed to intercept the U.S. Navy task force that had launched the strike, but the orders were canceled on 19 April and the submarines resumed their voyage to Truk, which they reached on 24 April 1942.

==== Second war patrol ====
On 30 April 1942, I-22, I-24, I-28, and I-29 got underway from Truk to form a patrol line southwest of Guadalcanal in support of Operation MO, a planned Japanese invasion of Tulagi in the Solomon Islands and Port Moresby on New Guinea. While they were en route, aircraft from the aircraft carrier USS Yorktown — both SBD Dauntless dive bombers of Scouting Squadron 5 (VS-5) and TBD Devastator torpedo bombers of Torpedo Squadron 5 (VT-5) — attacked I-24 on 2 May 1942, but she avoided damage.

The Battle of the Coral Sea began on 4 May 1942 as Allied forces moved to block the Japanese offensive. As the battle continued, the four Japanese submarines arrived in their assigned areas and formed their patrol line on 5 May 1942. While the Japanese seized Tulagi and were turned back from Port Moresby, I-24′s patrol passed quietly. The four submarines received orders on 11 May 1942 to return to Truk. While they were en route, the submarine USS Tautog sighted two Japanese submarines — probably I-22 and I-24 — proceeding separately on the surface and unsuccessfully attacked one of them early on the morning of 17 May 1942, but a few hours later sank I-28, which was trailing I-22 and I-24 on the same course. I-24 arrived safely at Truk later that day.

==== Attack on Sydney Harbour and third war patrol ====
On the day she arrived at Truk, I-24 embarked a Type A midget submarine delivered by the seaplane tender Chiyoda. Assigned to a Special Attack Unit along with her fellow midget-submarine mother ships I-22 and I-27 and the seaplane-carrying submarines I-21 and I-29 — each of them with an embarked Yokosuka E14Y1 (Allied reporting name "Glen") floatplane — she got underway in company with I-24 and I-27 on 18 May 1942 bound for Sydney, Australia, to launch a midget submarine attack against ships in Sydney Harbour. On 19 May 1942, when she surfaced to charge her batteries and conduct maintenance work on her midget submarine, the midget's two-man crew smelled a strong scent of chlorine when they entered their craft, and when its enlisted crewman turned on a light, a large explosion occurred which blew him overboard and severely burned the midget's commander. The enlisted man's body was never found despite an extensive search. I-24 returned to Truk on 20 May 1942, unloaded the damaged midget submarine and its injured commander, and embarked another midget submarine — M17 — and crew originally intended for the sunken I-28. She quickly got back underway for Truk.

During the voyage to Sydney, I-22, I-24, and I-27 received reconnaissance reports from I-29, which launched her floatplane to reconnoiter Sydney Harbour on 23 May 1942, and I-21, whose floatplane conducted a reconnaissance flight early on the morning of 29 May 1942 and sighted the heavy cruiser USS Chicago at Sydney, mistakenly reporting her as a battleship. That day, the commander of the Eastern Advanced Detachment ordered the three submarines to launch the midget submarine attack.

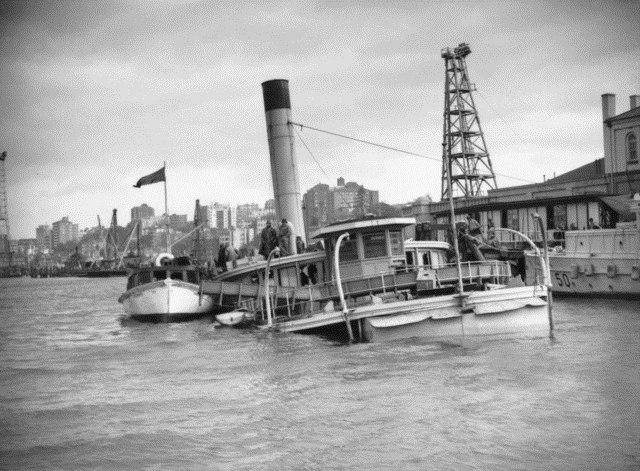
HMAS Kuttabul sunk in Sydney Harbour

On 30 May 1942, I-22, I-24, and I-27 arrived off Sydney. Late on the afternoon of 31 May, they launched their midget submarines to begin what became known as the attack on Sydney Harbour; I-24 launched M17 7.5 nautical miles (13.9 km; 8.6 mi) off Sydney at 17:40. At 22:07 on 31 May, all ships in the harbor were alerted to the presence of Japanese submarines, and Chicago opened fire on M17 with her antiaircraft guns. At 00:29 on 1 June 1942, M17 fired a torpedo at Chicago which missed her but exploded against a breakwater. The explosion sank HMAS Kuttabul, an old ferry in use as a Royal Australian Navy barracks ship, killing 21 sailors sleeping on board, and damaged the Royal Netherlands Navy submarine HNLMS K IX. Her second and last torpedo went aground on Garden Island. M17 subsequently disappeared, and her crew later was listed as missing in action.

I-22, I-24, and I-27 loitered off Sydney until 3 June 1942 in the hope of recovering their midget submarines — none of which returned — then gave up hope and departed the area, splitting up to begin anti-shipping patrols. At dusk on 3 June, I-24 was on the surface recharging her batteries east of Sydney, 35 nautical miles (65 km; 40 mi) southeast of Norah Head, when she sighted the Australian 4,734-gross register ton coastal steamer Age. She fired a torpedo and four 140-millimeter (5.5 in) rounds from her deck gun at Age but did not damage her. Age reported the attack and broke contact with I-24, although I-24′s crew believed Age had sunk. About 90 minutes later while 27 nautical miles (50 km; 31 mi) east of Sydney, I-24 fired two torpedoes at the Australian 4,812-ton merchant ship Iron Chieftain, which was on a voyage from Newcastle, New South Wales, to Whyalla, South Australia, with a cargo of coke and shipyard materials. One of the torpedoes hit her port side amidships, and she sank about five minutes later. On 5 June 1942, I-24 sighted the Australian 3,362-ton merchant ship Echunga — bound from Whyalla to Port Kembla, New South Wales — 17 nautical miles (31 km; 20 mi) off Wollongong, New South Wales, and gave chase, but did not inflict any damage on her.

On 8 June 1942, I-24 surfaced after midnight 4 nautical miles (7.4 km; 4.6 mi) off Sydney and opened fire on the Sydney Harbour Bridge with her 140-millimeter (5.5 in) deck gun. She fired ten rounds, none of which hit the bridge and nine of which were duds. The only shell that exploded leveled part of a house in Sydney's eastern suburbs, and duds caused some minor additional damage. No one was injured, although panicked residents of the Sydney area fled out of fear that a Japanese invasion had begun. When the Australians turned on searchlights to find I-24, she ceased fire and submerged before coastal artillery batteries could open fire on her. A United States Army Air Forces P-39 Airacobra fighter of the 35th Pursuit Group′s 41st Pursuit Squadron that took off from Bankstown Aerodrome to find and attack I-24 crashed just after takeoff.

Just before dawn on 9 June 1942, I-24 sighted the British 7,748-ton merchant ship Orestes southeast of Jervis Bay. She fired two torpedoes, both of which detonated prematurely, then opened fire on Orestes with her deck gun. She scored only one hit and, seeing no sign of a fire breaking out about Orestes, I-24′s commanding officer decided to abandon the pursuit. Orestes survived, and I-24 concluded her patrol with her arrival at Kwajalein on 25 June in company with I-21, I-22, I-27, and I-29. She then proceeded to Yokosuka, which she reached on 12 July 1942.

==== Guadalcanal campaign ====
During I-24′s stay at Yokosuka, the Guadalcanal campaign began on 7 August 1942 with U.S. amphibious landings on Guadalcanal, Tulagi, Florida Island, Gavutu, and Tanambogo in the southeastern Solomon Islands. On 30 August 1942, she departed Yokosuka bound for the Solomon Islands to conduct her fifth war patrol. On the morning of 13 September 1942, a Kawanishi H8K (Allied reporting name "Emily") flying boat reported a U.S. task force consisting of one aircraft carrier, two battleships, and two destroyers steaming north 343 nautical miles (635 km; 395 mi) east-southeast of Guadalcanal, and I-24 received orders to form a patrol line with the submarines I-9, I-15, I-17, I-21, I-26, I-31, and I-33 in attempt to intercept the U.S. ships, but they did not succeed.

During the Battle of the Santa Cruz Islands, which lasted from 25 to 27 October 1942, I-24 patrolled west of the Indispensable Strait as part of the "B" Group with I-9, I-15, I-21, and the submarines I-174 and I-175. On 27 October she attacked a U.S. task force in the Solomon Sea at 15°05′S 159°45′W, firing a spread of torpedoes at a battleship. She scored no hits, but heard the explosion of depth charges.

I-24 arrived at the Japanese anchorage off Shortland Island in the Shortland Islands on 2 November 1942 and was assigned to an attack group which also included I-16 and I-20. On 3 November she embarked the midget submarine No. 12 — which Chiyoda had delivered to the anchorage— and its two-man crew, and on 4 November she departed in company with I-16 bound for the Indispensable Strait off Guadalcanal. She was patrolling there by 7 November, but her midget submarine malfunctioned, so she proceeded to Truk, which she reached on 13 November 1942. No. 12 underwent repairs, then I-24 reembarked the midget submarine and got underway from Truk on 15 November. On 22 November 1942, I-24 launched No. 12 14 nautical miles (26 km; 16 mi) northwest of Cape Esperance on the northwest coast of Guadalcanal, after which No. 12 was never heard from again.

At Shortland Island, I-24 embarked the midget submarine No. 38 on 1 December 1942 and launched No. 38 off Lungga Point on the northern coast of Gudalcanal at 01:42 on 7 December 1942. No. 38 targeted the badly damaged cargo ship USS Alchiba, which had been beached off Lungga Point since No. 10, a midget submarine launched by I-16, had torpedoed her on 28 November 1942 while Alchiba was on a voyage from Nouméa, New Caledonia, to Guadalcanal with a cargo of aviation gasoline, bombs, and ammunition. No. 38 torpedoed Alchiba at 06:59 on 7 December on her port side near her engine room. Allied forces counterattacked No. 38 with depth charges, and she was never heard from again. I-24 later proceeded to Truk.

==== New Guinea campaign ====
On 3 January 1943, I-24 departed Truk bound for Rabaul, where she took up duties running supplies from Rabaul to New Guinea, where Japanese forces were fighting in the New Guinea campaign. On her first run, she delivered 25 tons of food and ammunition and evacuated 79 Imperial Japanese Army soldiers at Buna on 11 January 1943. She next called at Buna on 18 January, dropping off 20 tons of cargo and evacuating 58 soldiers and the battle flag of the 144th (Kochi) Infantry Division. Her third visit to Buna was on 26 January 1943, when she discharged 16 tons of cargo and embarked 64 soldiers for transportation to Rabaul, which she reached on 28 January 1943. She called at Buna for the last time on 10 February 1943, unloading 16 tons of cargo and bringing aboard 71 soldiers.

I-24′s next supply run was to Lae, where she discharged 32 tons of cargo and picked up 72 soldiers on 10 February 1943. On her last New Guinea supply run, she visited Lae on 17 February 1943, delivered 38.5 tons of cargo and evacuated 64 soldiers. She then proceeded to Japan, where she arrived at Yokosuka on 6 March 1943 for an overhaul. With her overhaul complete, she put to sea from Yokosuka on 7 May 1943.

==== Aleutian Islands campaign ====
Japanese forces had occupied Attu and Kiska in the Aleutian Islands in June 1942, beginning the Aleutian Islands campaign, and by the spring of 1943 the Japanese garrisons in the two islands were becoming increasingly isolated. On 11 May 1943 U.S. forces landed on Attu, beginning the Battle of Attu. I-24 arrived at Kure on 20 May, and on 21 May, as the situation on Attu deteriorated, the Japanese Imperial General Headquarters decided to abandon the garrison on Attu and evacuate the isolated garrison on Kiska by submarine, with the evacuation to begin on 26 May 1943.

On 21 May, I-24 was assigned to the Northern District Force in the 5th Fleet for service in Aleutian waters, and that day she departed Kure bound for the Kuril Islands, where she called at Paramushiro. She got back underway on 30 May 1943 for Attu, where she hoped to bring aboard survivors of the Japanese garrison at Chichagof Harbor. U.S. forces had completed the conquest of Attu on 30 May 1943 and annihilated the Japanese garrison, however, and after three unsuccessful attempts to contact any surviving Japanese ashore, she gave up. She departed the Attu area on 5 June 1943 to move to a patrol area off Kiska. On 7 June 1943, she transmitted a message reporting many Allied ships in the vicinity of Kiska. The Japanese never heard from her again.

==== Loss ====
On 11 June 1943, the U.S. Navy patrol craft USS PC-487 detected I-24 first on sonar, then on radar, and finally visually in heavy fog in the Bering Sea north-northeast of Shemya Island, noting that I-24 had both her periscopes up, apparently because of the very poor visibility. PC-487 depth-charged I-24 and forced her to the surface, then rammed her at 19 knots (35 km/h; 22 mph), riding up and over I-24′s hull. PC-487 then backed off and rammed I-24 again, striking her conning tower. I-24 rolled over and sank at 53°16′N 174°24′E with the loss of all 104 men on board.

The Japanese declared I-24 to be presumed lost with all hands on 11 June 1943. She was stricken from the Navy list on 1 August 1943.
