= Ha. 62-76 Japanese Midget Attack Submarine =

- U.S. National Register of Historic Places
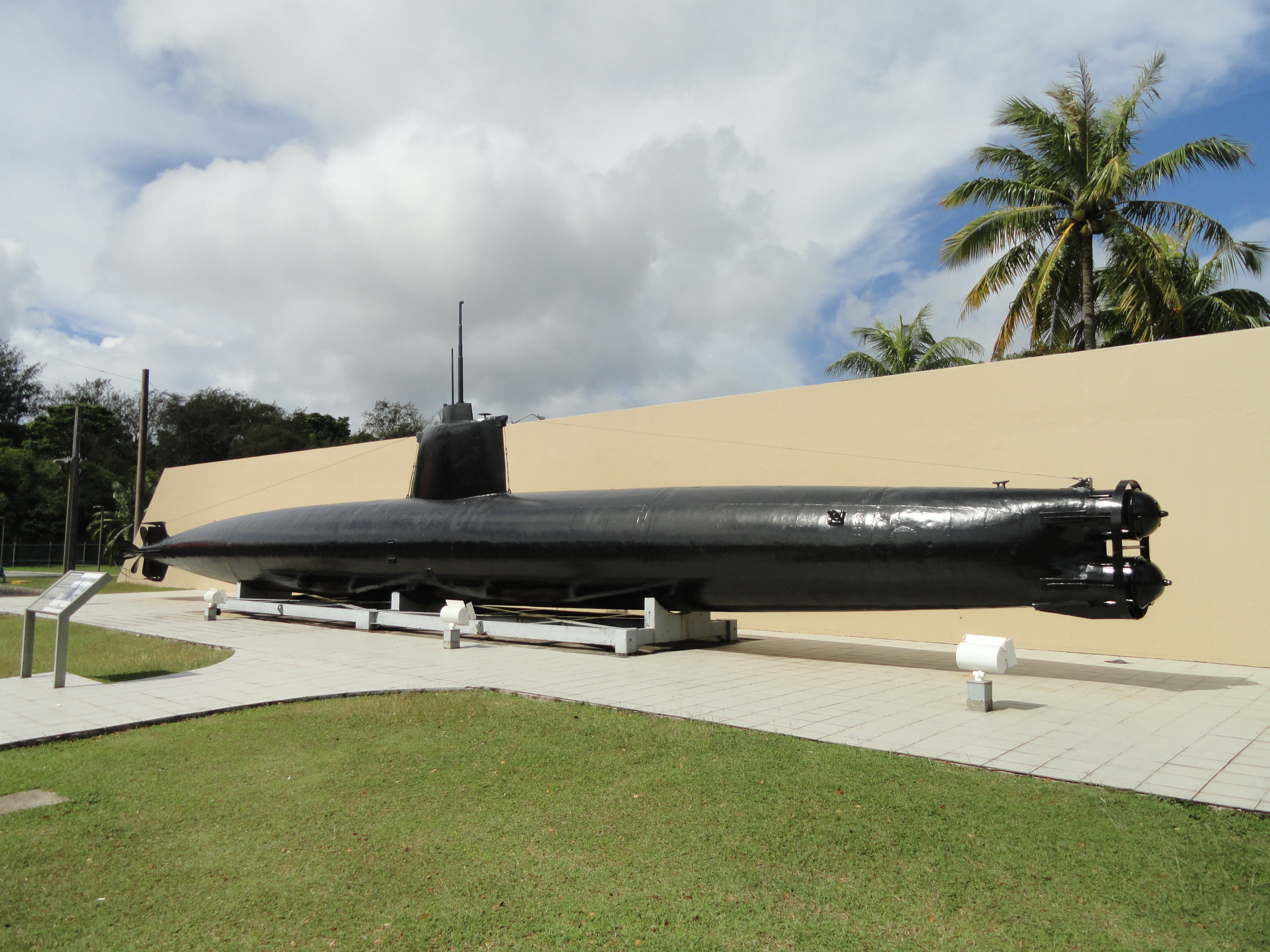

- Location within Guam
- Location: Chapel Rd. near barracks 14, Comnavmarianas, Guam
- Coordinates: 13°25′43″N 144°38′46″E
- Area: less than one acre
- Built: 1944
- Built by: Ourazake
- Architectural style: Type C submarine
- NRHP reference No.: 99001706
- Added to NRHP: February 3, 1999

The Ha. 62-76 Japanese Midget Submarine, is located in front of the T. Stell Newman Visitor Center 1657-B, Santa Rita, Guam, was built in 1944. It is a Type C Kō-hyōteki-class submarine (甲標的丙型) built by Ōurazaki, Kure. It was captured during World War II, after it ran aground on Togcha Beach, near Ipan Talofofo, Guam, in 1944. Its crew surrendered three days later.

It was listed on the U.S. National Register of Historic Places in 1999. It is of a model of submarine deployed in the later part of World War II; its advantage over "Type A" Kō-hyōteki-class submarine is that it had a diesel generator that extended its range of operations. It is thought that only fifteen "Type C" submarines were built; this is the only known surviving example. Its insides were cleaned out by the Navy before it was placed on display at "old Camp Dealy" on Togcha Bay, Guam. It was moved to Naval Station, Guam, in 1952. It is located at the T. Stell Newman Visitor Center, a part of the National Park Service, War in the Pacific, National Historical Park Guam, just outside the Naval Base.

== See also ==
- HA. 19 (Japanese Midget Submarine), surrendered in Hawaii
