= Japanese submarine HA. 19 =

IJN submarine beached at Pearl Harbor 1941

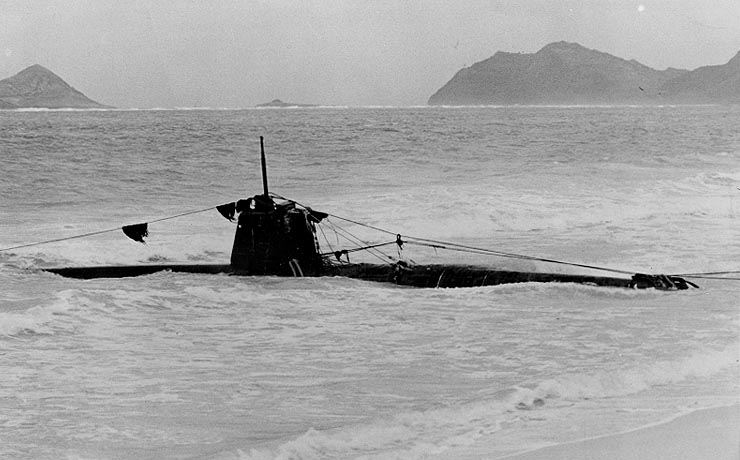
- HA. 19 grounded in the surf on Oahu after the Attack on Pearl Harbor, December 1941

History

Japan
- Name: HA. 19
- Builder: Kure Naval Dockyard, Kure
- Launched: 1938
- Captured: Grounded, Oahu 7 December 1941
- Status: Museum exhibit

General characteristics
- Type: Type A Kō-hyōteki-class submarine
- Displacement: 46 long tons (47 t) submerged
- Length: 23.9 m (78 ft 5 in)
- Beam: 1.8 m (5 ft 11 in)
- Height: 3 m (9 ft 10 in)
- Propulsion: 1 × electric motor, 600 hp (447 kW); 2 × counter-rotating screws
- Speed: 23 knots (43 km/h; 26 mph) surfaced; 19 knots (35 km/h; 22 mph) submerged
- Range: 100 nmi (190 km) at 2 kn (3.7 km/h; 2.3 mph); 80 nmi (150 km) at 6 kn (11 km/h; 6.9 mph); 18 nmi (33 km) at 19 kn (35 km/h; 22 mph)
- Test depth: 30 m (98 ft)
- Complement: 2
- Armament: 2 × 450 mm (17.7 in) torpedoes, muzzle-loaded into tubes; 1 × 300 lb (140 kg) scuttling charge
- HA. 19 (Japanese Midget Submarine)
- U.S. National Register of Historic Places
- U.S. National Historic Landmark
- Location within Texas Location within the United States
- Location: National Museum of the Pacific War, 340 E. Main St., Fredericksburg, Texas
- Coordinates: 30°16′20″N 98°52′6″W
- Area: 0.1 acres (0.040 ha)
- NRHP reference No.: 89001428

Significant dates
- Added to NRHP: June 30, 1989
- Designated NHL: June 30, 1989

HA. 19 (also known as Japanese Midget Submarine "C" by the United States Navy) is a historic Imperial Japanese Navy Type A Kō-hyōteki-class midget submarine that was part of the Japanese Attack on Pearl Harbor on 7 December 1941. The submarine's crew was ordered to enter Pearl Harbor, attack the moored American warships with its two torpedoes and then scuttle her with explosives. However, the crew was unable to enter the harbor due to navigational difficulties, and the submarine ran aground and was captured by American forces.

HA. 19 is now displayed at the National Museum of the Pacific War in Fredericksburg, Texas.

== Build ==
HA. 19 was built at Kure Naval Dockyard, Kure, Hiroshima, Japan as a Type A Kō-hyōteki-class midget submarine in 1938. The Type 92 periscope was installed later in May 1941.

== Pearl Harbor ==
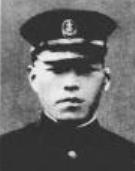
Kiyoshi Inagaki

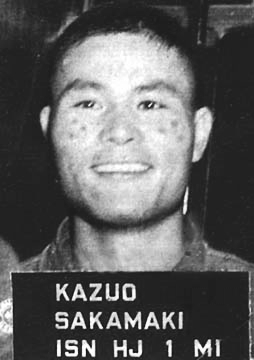
Kazuo Sakamaki

In November 1941, HA. 19 was part of the Kido Butai, carried by the Type C cruiser submarine I-24, its mother ship, from the Kamegakubi Naval Proving Ground. Its two-man crew consisted of Ensign Kazuo Sakamaki and Chief warrant officer Kiyoshi Inagaki. At 03:30 on 7 December 1941, HA. 19 was launched from I-24 with a broken gyrocompass. The crew had four-and-a-half hours to reach Pearl Harbor, and attempted to fix the compass en route.

HA. 19 approached the harbor entrance, but impaired by the malfunctioning compass, she hit a reef three times and grounded on the right side of the entrance at 08:00. With the main attack underway, the stranded submarine was spotted at 08:17 by the destroyer USS Helm. Inagaki dived the submarine, and when he resurfaced at 08:19, the destroyer spotted her again and fired, missing but blasting HA. 19 off the reef, knocking Sakamaki unconscious. Inagaki dived once more to escape.

When Sakamaki regained consciousness, the crew made another attempt to enter the harbor. The grounding had damaged the vessel so she could not fire one of her torpedoes. HA. 19 was slowly flooding and the batteries were giving off fumes from being in contact with seawater. Attempting to enter the harbor they hit the reef again and reversed for another attempt. On the next try, she grounded again, but came free after adjusting the ballast. On the final attempt, HA. 19 was depth charged, which disabled her ability to fire the other torpedo and damaged the periscope.

The crew decided to abort the attack and return to I-24 near Lanai. The fumes given off by the batteries finally overcame them and HA. 19 was carried by the currents. The crew awoke to find it was night, and they planned to beach the submarine at Waimānalo. The engine died and she grounded on an offshore reef. Sakamaki ordered Inagaki to abandon ship while he set the explosive scuttling charge and followed suit. The charge failed to detonate, likely from being immersed in seawater. Sakamaki managed to swim through the surf to shore where he collapsed and was captured the next day; however, Inagaki drowned and his body washed ashore the next day.

== Capture ==
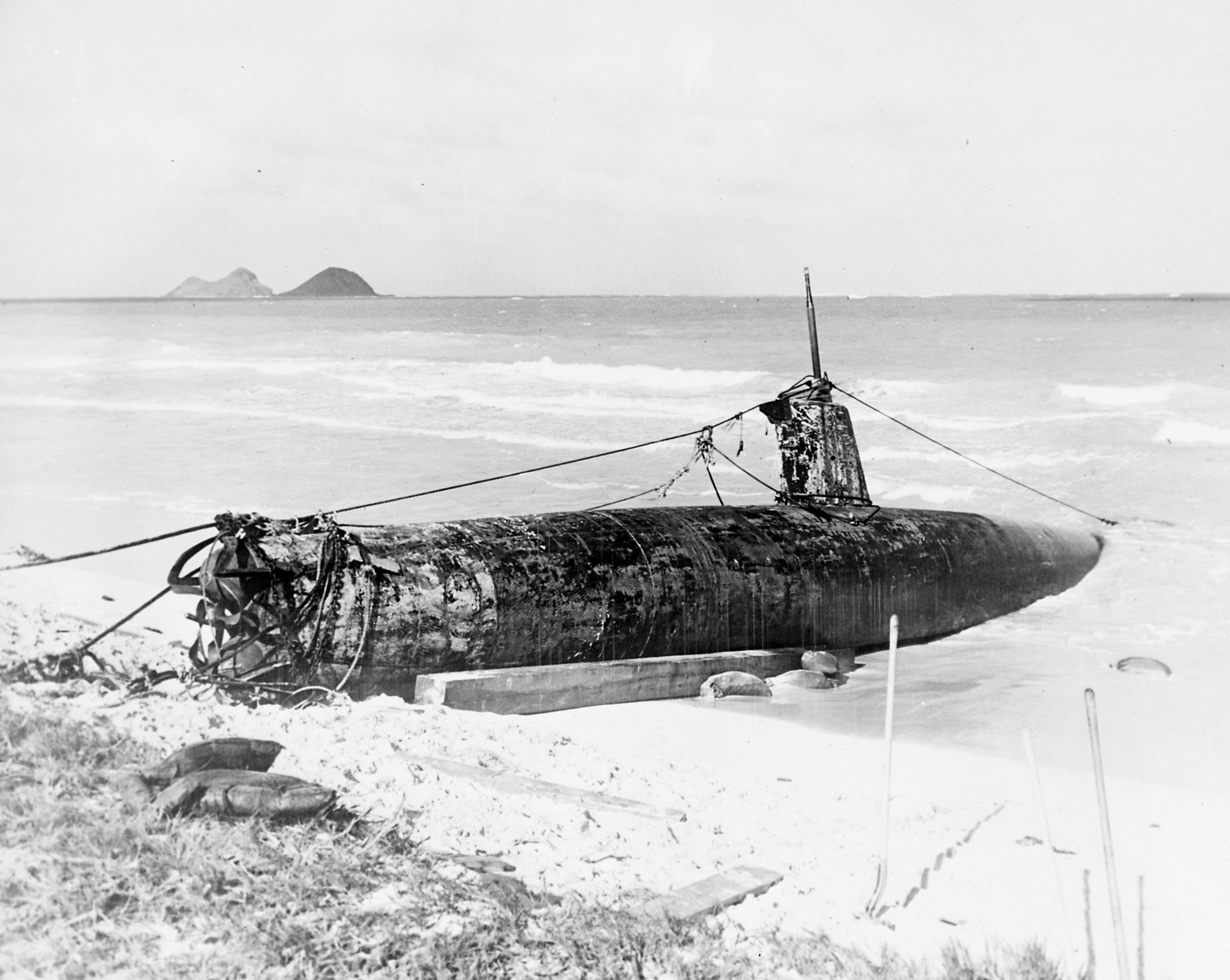
HA. 19 being hauled ashore at Waimānalo, 1941

HA. 19 was given the American designation of "Midget C", the third letter of the alphabet, being the third midget submarine spotted by American forces. On 8 December 1941, the abandoned HA. 19 was bombed by United States Army aircraft. The bombs missed and she broke free and washed on to the beach. In the days following the attack she was pulled out of the sea with the aid of an Army tractor. HA. 19 was built to be disassembled into three parts, and this characteristic was utilized to dismantle her without destroying the vessel. She was transported to the Naval Submarine Base Pearl Harbor and examined, yielding technical data and various documents. It was determined that most of the damage to HA. 19 was a result of the multiple groundings.

== Exhibit ==
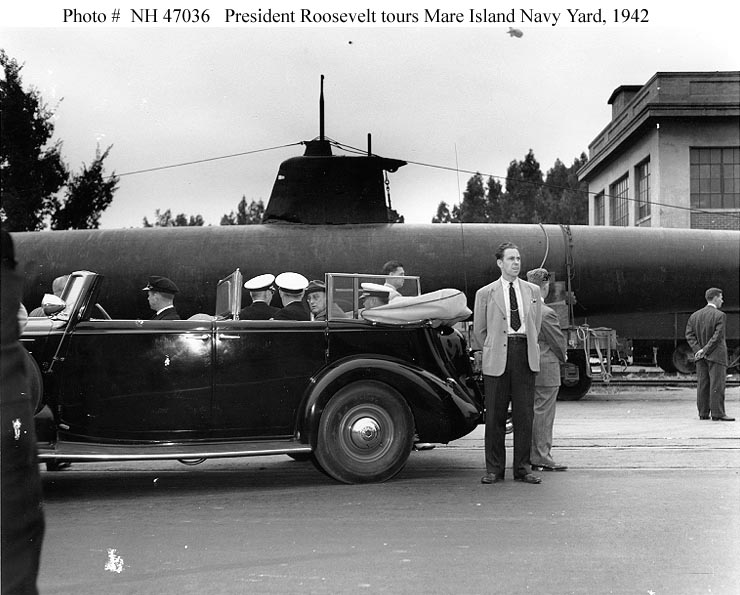
HA. 19 on war bond tour at Mare Island Navy Yard, 1942

HA. 19 was sent to the U.S. mainland in September 1942 where she went on war bond tours. She was at Navy Pier, Chicago, Illinois when the war ended.

On 20 January 1947, HA. 19 was put on outdoor display at Naval Station Key West, Key West, Florida. On 2 December 1964, she was loaned to the Key West Art and Historical Association and moved to an outdoor exhibit at the Key West Lighthouse and Military Museum adjacent to Key West Light. On 30 June 1989, HA. 19 was listed on the U.S. National Register of Historic Places, and was declared a U.S. National Historic Landmark.

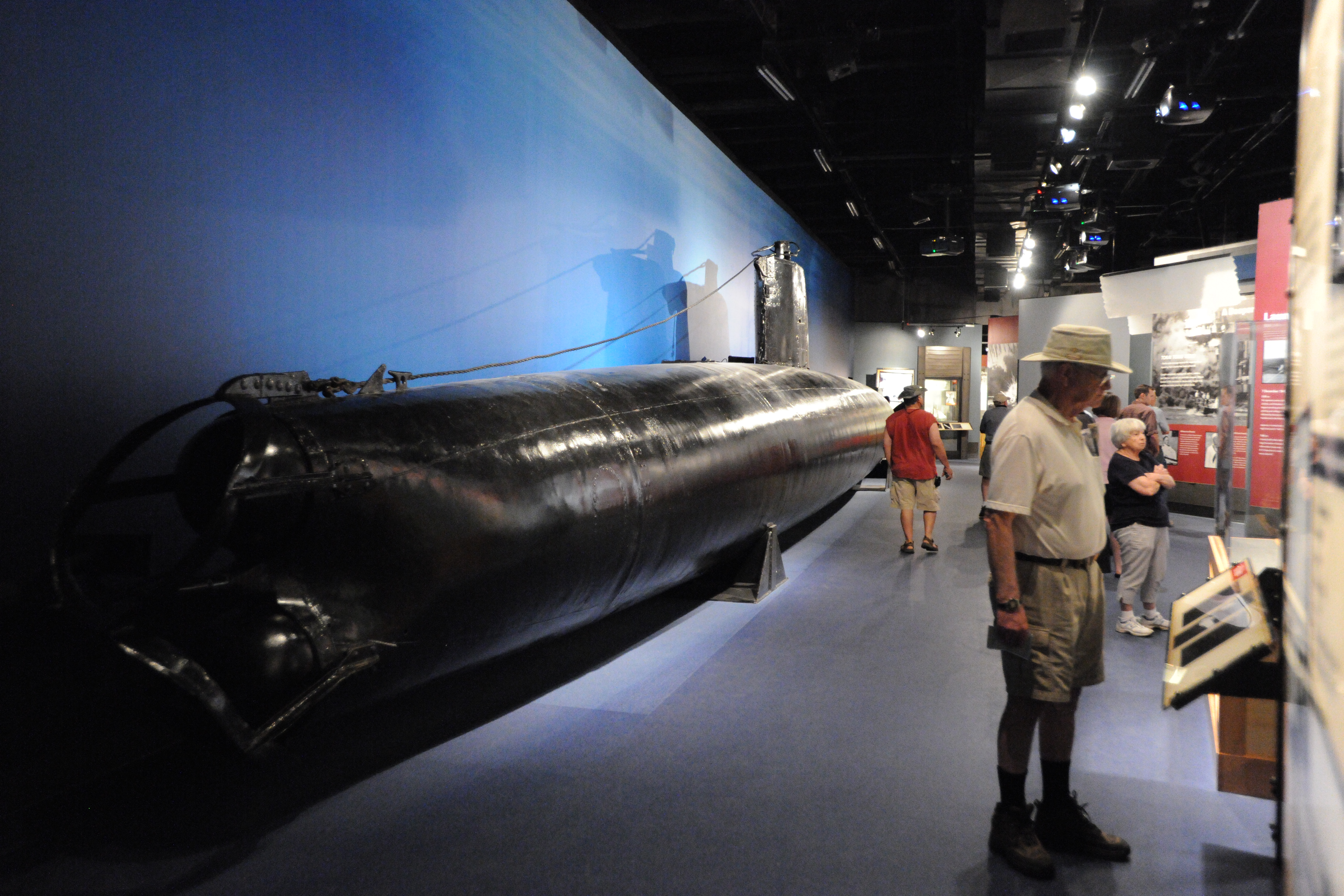
HA. 19 at the National Museum of the Pacific War

In 1990, the association administering the Key West museum decided to transition their facility to a strictly lighthouse museum and began divesting itself of its military collections. In 1991, HA. 19 was moved to Fredericksburg, Texas to become part of the National Museum of the Pacific War at the Admiral Nimitz State Historic Site. That same year, Sakamaki attended a historical conference at the museum and was reunited with his submarine.

== See also ==
- Ha. 62-76 Japanese Midget Attack Submarine, surrendered in Guam
- List of U.S. National Historic Landmark ships, shipwrecks, and shipyards
- List of National Historic Landmarks in Texas
- National Register of Historic Places listings in Gillespie County, Texas
- Recorded Texas Historic Landmarks in Gillespie County

== Sources ==
- Delgado, James P. (27 December 1988). "National Register of Historic Places Registration Form / Ha. 19 (Japanese Midget Submarine)" (pdf). National Park Service.
  - "Accompanying Photos" (pdf). National Park Service.
