= David Akui =

United States Army soldier

David Mekaele Akui
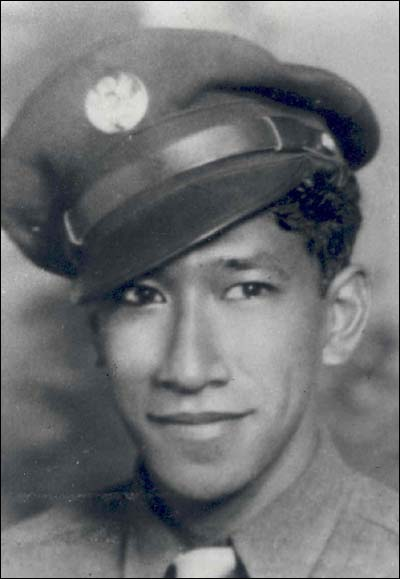
- Born: January 16, 1920; Hawaii
- Died: September 15, 1987 (aged 67); Kāneʻohe, Honolulu, Hawaii
- Military career
- Allegiance: United States
- Branch: U.S. Army
- Service years: 1940–1945
- Rank: Master sergeant
- Units: Hawaii National Guard; 5307th Composite Unit
- Conflicts: World War II; Pacific War; Attack on Pearl Harbor; Burma campaign

David Mekaele Akui (January 16, 1920 – September 15, 1987) was an American soldier who became famous for capturing the first Japanese prisoner of war in World War II. At the time, Akui was a corporal in Company G, 298th Infantry Regiment of the Hawaii National Guard.

== Biography ==
This section appears to be missing information. If you have a reliable source that documents the rest of his life, please add it in.

Of mixed native Hawaiian and Japanese immigrant ancestry, Akui was inducted into federal service on 15 October 1940 and served in the Pacific Theater until the end of the war.

=== Pearl Harbor ===
On December 8, 1941, the morning after the Japanese attack on Pearl Harbor, Akui and Lieutenant Paul C. Plybon (1918–1996) were walking along Waimānalo Beach when Akui found a Japanese man lying unconscious on the beach. The man awoke to find Akui standing over him with a drawn pistol. Akui took the man into custody and he was identified as Ensign Kazuo Sakamaki, commander of a two-man midget submarine that took part in the Pearl Harbor attacks.

Ensign Sakamaki's submarine's gyrocompass malfunctioned, causing the submarine to sail in circles at periscope depth. Sakamaki ran aground on a reef, where the United States Navy destroyer USS Helm spotted his submarine and opened fire. The destroyer's gunners missed, but the blasts freed the submarine from the reef and Sakamaki was able to submerge. When he could not repair the gyrocompass, Sakamaki ordered Petty Officer 2nd Class Kiyoshi Inagaki to swim ashore, while he set the demolition charges to destroy the submarine. Sakamaki then abandoned ship himself.

Inagaki drowned attempting to swim ashore. Sakamaki succeeded, but passed out from exhaustion. Corporal Akui found him there. Sakamaki's demolition charges failed to explode and his submarine also washed ashore where it was found by United States Army Air Forces 1Lt. Jean K. Lambert (1914–1995) and 1Lt. James T. Lewis. It was salvaged and is now in the Admiral Nimitz Museum at Fredericksburg, Texas.

=== Burma ===
Akui served through the remainder of the war in the Pacific Ocean Theater and was a member of the famed "Merrill's Marauders", who fought the Japanese in the jungles of Burma. He retired from the United States Army as a master sergeant and spent the rest of his life in Hawaii. He died in Kāneʻohe, Honolulu in 1987 at the age of 67.
