= Yandra =

990-ton coastal steamer

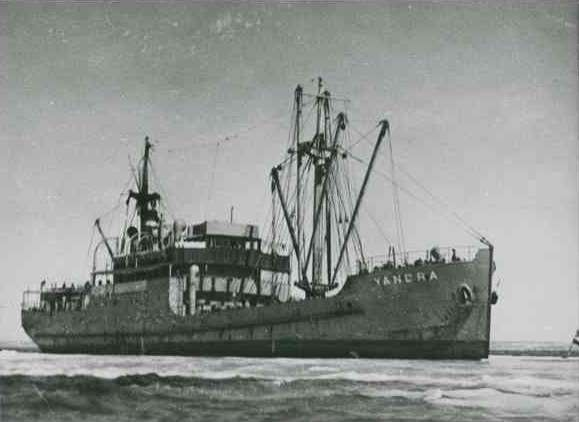
- Yandra circa 1930

History

Australia
- Name: Yandra (1928–1959)
- Namesake: Aboriginal: "All alike"
- Owner: Coast Steamships, Adelaide
- Builder: Burmeister & Wain, Copenhagen
- Launched: 1928
- Fate: Ran aground Neptune Islands 1959 and written off

History

Australia
- Name: HMAS Yandra (1940–1946)
- Acquired: June 1940
- Commissioned: 22 September 1940
- Decommissioned: 1946
- Fate: Returned to owners

General characteristics
- Type: Tug
- Displacement: 990 tons
- Length: 211.1 feet (64.3 m)
- Beam: 35.2 feet (10.7 m)
- Draught: 11.9 feet (3.6 m)

Yandra was a 990-ton coastal steamer built by Burmeister & Wain, Copenhagen in 1928 for Coast Steamships for service in the Australian state of South Australia. She was requisitioned by the Royal Australian Navy in June 1940 during World War II for conversion to a minesweeper and anti-submarine vessel and was commissioned on 22 September 1940 as HMAS Yandra. She returned to civilian service in 1946. She ran aground during dense fog onto South Neptune Island on 25 January 1959 and was subsequently written off.

== Service in South Australia ==
The Yandra was built for Coast Steamships, a wholly owned subsidiary of the Adelaide Steamship Company, by Burmeister & Wain, Copenhagen. She arrived in Port Adelaide from London on 23 October 1928 and commenced service in early November 1928. She was specifically designed for serving regional ports on the west coast of Eyre Peninsula – a locality commonly known as the 'west coast' in South Australia. Her relatively shallow draft allowed access to ports at destinations such as Elliston and Venus Bay.

== Military service ==
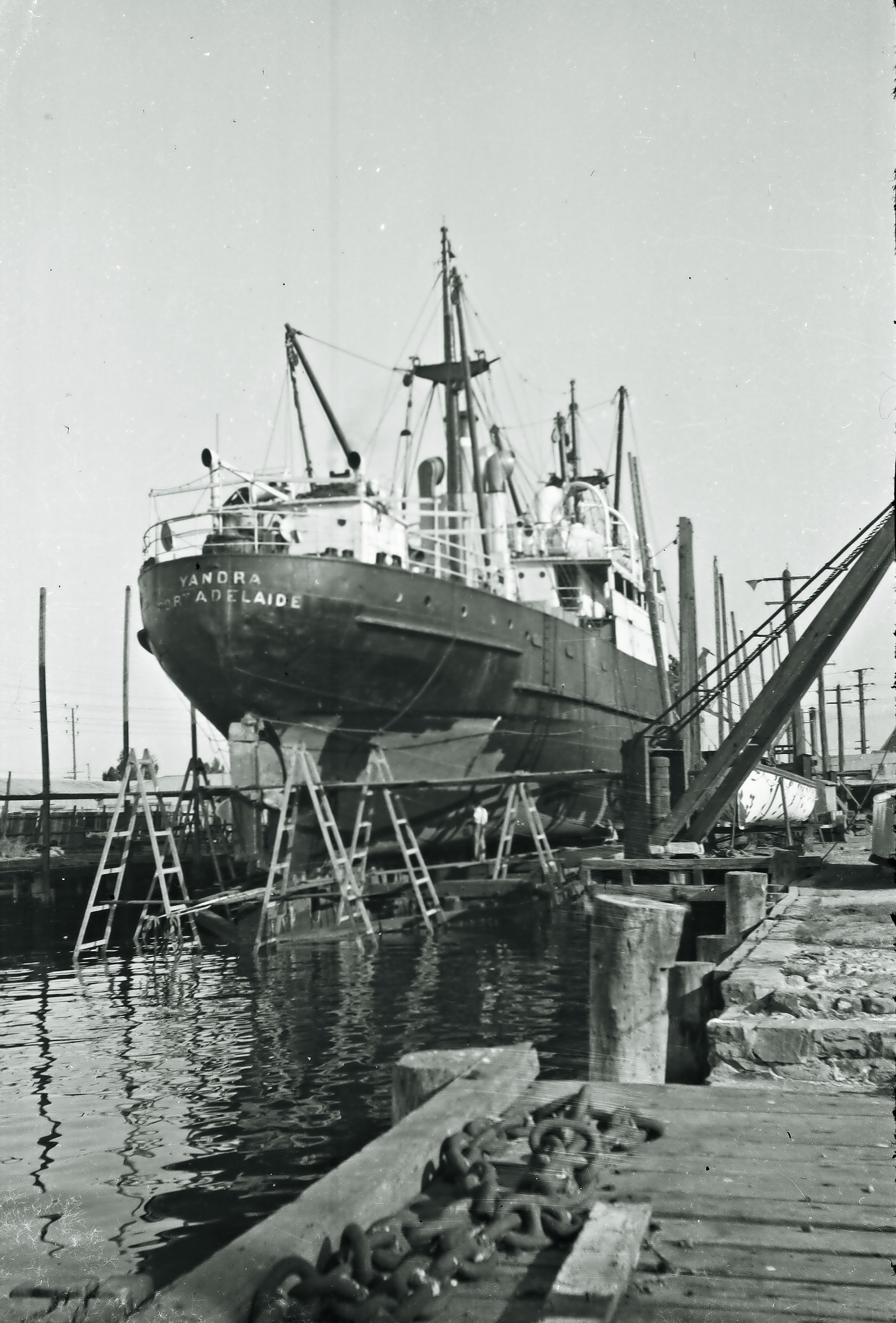
Photograph of the Yandra

The Yandra was requisitioned from Coast Steamships on 27 June 1940. She was converted for anti-submarine warfare in Sydney and then commissioned into the Royal Australian Navy on 22 September 1940.

HMAS Yandra challenged a ship off Rottnest Island, Western Australia on 5 October 1941 during the night and was given a false name Salland, from Calcutta. The ship never appeared in port as expected and caused naval intelligence some concern that this vessel could have been the German auxiliary cruiser Kormoran, it was dismissed as a misreading of the morse code. HMAS Yandra picked up 72 German survivors of the Kormoran on 27 November 1941, while searching for HMAS Sydney.

Transferred to Sydney, HMAS Yandra was patrolling off the harbour boom gate on 31 May 1942, when a Japanese midget submarine (later identified as M-27) got entangled in the boom net. She later sighted a midget submarine (later identified as M-21) in the harbour. HMAS Yandra and HMAS Sea Mist dropped depth charges over the site, with HMAS Yandra ramming the midget submarine on the bows. Unfortunately, both HMAS Yandra and HMAS Sea Mist were disabled by their own depth charges. After being repaired, HMAS Yandra patrolled on both the Australian east and west coasts, and New Guinea.

She was returned to her owner in 1946 and resumed service to west coast ports on 20 July 1946.

== Fate ==
Yandra ran aground during dense fog on the northern island in the South Neptune Island group at the mouth of Spencer Gulf at about 10 pm on Saturday, 25 January 1959 about 400 metres (1300 ft) from the lighthouse located on the nearby southern island. The decision to abandon ship was advised by radio at 11.10 pm. The crew abandoned the ship using a breeches buoy and all 23 crew had safely evacuated to the northern island by 11.45 pm where they spent the night in the open. At dawn, the fog started to clear and the grounded ship was sighted by the lighthouse keepers who had been unaware of the grounding due to difficulties with radio transmission. The yacht Iline, a competitor in the annual Neptune Island yacht race conducted by the Royal South Australian Yacht Squadron, answered a radio call at 3.30 am and proceeded to the wreck site where it assisted in ferrying to the crew to the lighthouse complex on the southern island. The tug Tusker was dispatched from Port Adelaide on 26 January 1959 to assess the damage. It was decided that Yandra could not be recovered and Tusker returned to Port Adelaide with the rescued crew. The wreck is officially located at 35°33′00″S 136°12′00″E.

Her Ships Bell is on display at Paramount Browns, Gepps Cross.

== See also ==
- List of ships of the Royal Australian Navy
- List of shipwrecks of Australia
- Type 97 torpedo
- Type A Ko-hyoteki-class submarine

== Further information ==
The online collection of the State Library of South Australia includes images of the ship during its grounding such as the following:

- The "Yandra Salvage", 21 February 1959 at http://images.slsa.sa.gov.au/mpcimg/20250/B20213.htm. Retrieved 30 June 2012.
- The "Yandra Salvage", 21 February 1959 at http://images.slsa.sa.gov.au/mpcimg/20250/B20212.htm. Retrieved 30 June 2012.
