= Kazuo Sakamaki =

Japanese naval officer

- 酒巻 和男
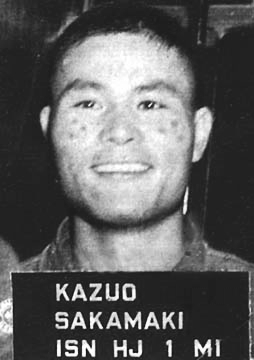
- Sakamaki in U.S. custody. The marks on his cheeks are self inflicted cigarette burns
- Born: November 8, 1918; Awa, Tokushima, Japan
- Died: November 29, 1999 (aged 81); Toyota, Aichi, Japan
- Military career
- Allegiance: Empire of Japan
- Branch: Imperial Japanese Navy
- Service years: 1940–1941
- Rank: Ensign
- Commands: HA. 19 midget submarine
- Conflicts: World War II; Pacific War; Attack on Pearl Harbor (POW)

Kazuo Sakamaki (酒巻 和男, Sakamaki Kazuo; November 8, 1918 – November 29, 1999) was a Japanese naval officer who became the first prisoner of war of World War II to be captured by U.S. forces.

== Early life and education ==
Sakamaki was born in what is now part of the city of Awa, Tokushima Prefecture, the second-oldest of eight sons. He was a graduate of the 68th class of the Imperial Japanese Naval Academy in 1940.

== Career ==
=== Attack on Pearl Harbor ===
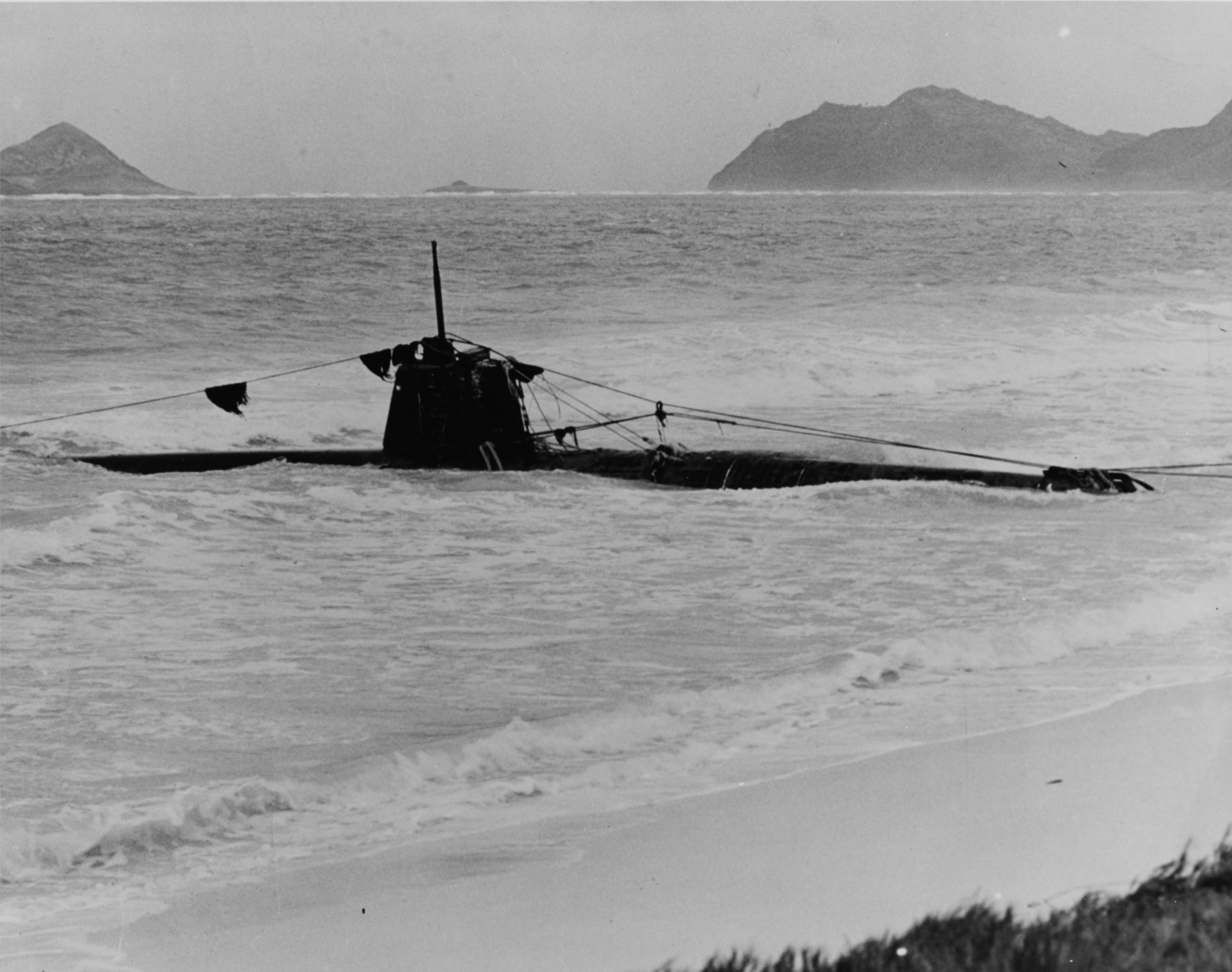
Sakamaki's HA-19, which ran aground

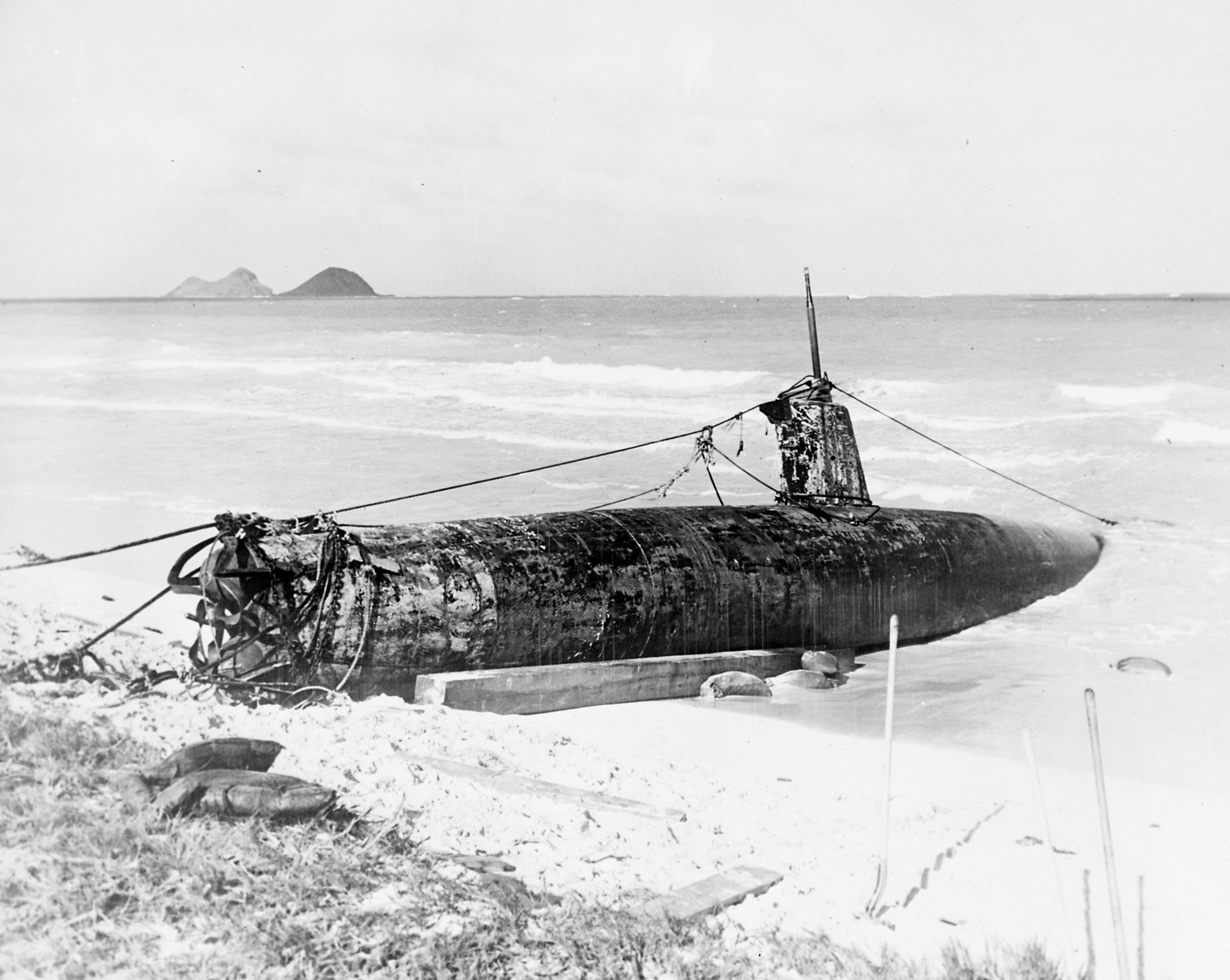
HA-19 pulled up to the beach

Ensign Sakamaki was one of ten sailors (five officers and five petty officers) selected to attack Pearl Harbor in five two-man Ko-hyoteki class midget submarines on 7 December 1941. Of the ten, nine were killed (including the other crewman in submarine HA. 19, CWO Kiyoshi Inagaki). Sakamaki was chosen for the mission due to his large number of siblings.

Sakamaki's submarine became trapped on a reef off Waimanalo Beach, Oahu, as it attempted to enter Pearl Harbor. The book Attack on Pearl Harbor claims that his submarine hit two coral reefs and sank. Sakamaki ordered his crewman, Kiyoshi Inagaki, to swim to shore, and Sakamaki attempted to scuttle the disabled submarine and swim to shore as well. The explosives failed to go off and Inagaki drowned.

Sakamaki made it to shore, but fell unconscious once on the beach, where he was found by a U.S. soldier, David Akui, and was taken into military custody. When he awoke, he found himself in a hospital under U.S. armed security. Sakamaki became the first Japanese prisoner of war in U.S. captivity during World War II. Japanese high command struck his name from the records and told his family that he had been killed in action. His submarine was recovered and taken on tours across the United States to encourage war bond purchases.

After being taken to Sand Island, Sakamaki requested that he be allowed to kill himself, which was denied. He spent the rest of the war in prisoner-of-war camps in the continental United States. After overcoming his initial depression, he resolved to continue living, and occupied his time as a POW by learning English. Sakamaki's family were informed that he was missing in action, but were told to keep the fact secret. While the nine other officers and sailors who had been killed during their mission were posthumously decorated and recognized as war heroes by the Imperial Japanese government, Sakamaki's name was deliberately omitted.

After the war's end, Sakamaki was repatriated to Japan in 1946, by which time he had become deeply committed to pacifism. Following his return, he received hate mail from strangers, including a letter ordering him to "immediately perform ritual suicide" and make a public apology for his shame of having been taken prisoner.

== Later life and death ==
Sakamaki married and raised a family. Though he privately published his memoirs, he avoided discussing his wartime experiences with his family. His eldest son, Kiyoshi, however, following a conversation with his father and after visiting the family of Kiyoshi Inagaki, thought he might have been named in memory of his father's wartime comrade.

Sakamaki joined the Toyota Motor Corporation, and put his English abilities to good use while managing export sales for the company. He became president of its Brazilian subsidiary in 1969. In 1983, he returned to Japan and continued working for Toyota before retiring in 1987. Apart from his memoirs, Sakamaki refused to speak about the war until 1991, when he attended a historical conference at the National Museum of the Pacific War in Fredericksburg, Texas. He reportedly cried at the conference when he was reunited with his submarine (which was on display at the museum) for the first time in 50 years.

He spent the rest of his life in Japan until his death in 1999 at the age of 81.

== Publications ==
- Four Years as a Prisoner-of-War, No. 1 (Japan). Published in the United States as I Attacked Pearl Harbor.
