= Type 97 torpedo =

Japanese torpedo

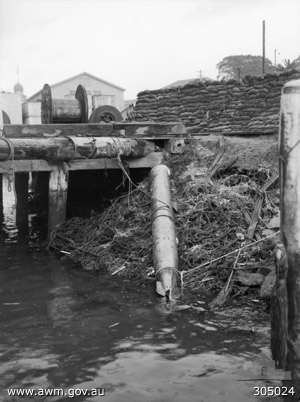
Type 97 Special torpedo, run aground at Garden Island, Sydney

The Type 97 was a 17.7 inches (45 cm) diameter torpedo used by the Imperial Japanese Navy during World War II. Intended for use with Japan's Kō-hyōteki-class midget submarines, the torpedo was based on the 24-inch diameter Type 93 "Long Lance" used by Japanese surface vessels, but redesigned to meet the smaller 18-inch physical dimensions of the midgets' two torpedo tubes. Larger Japanese submarines were armed with the 21-inch Type 95 torpedo.

It was not a great success. Its first operational use was in the attack on Pearl Harbor, after which it was modified as the Type 97 Special, sometimes known as the Type 98. It had a 772 pounds (350 kg) warhead and a range of 3.4 miles (5.5 km) at 44 knots (81 km/h).

== Type 97 Special ==
Four Type 97 Special torpedoes were fired during the Japanese midget submarine raid on Sydney Harbour in the early hours of June 1, 1942. Two were fired by the midget M-24 and aimed at the American heavy cruiser USS Chicago, then tied to the No 2. buoy at Garden Island in Sydney Harbour. Both missed. One struck the harbour wall beneath the depot ship HMAS Kuttabul, sinking the converted ferry and killing 19 Australian and 2 British sailors aboard. The second failed to arm, and ran harmlessly aground at Garden Island.

The remaining two were fired in Sydney Harbour by the midget M-21. The timing of their firing and their target, if any, are unknown. M-21 had been rammed and depth charged by HMAS Yandra at the entrance to Sydney Harbour around 2300 on May 31, but managed to recover sufficiently to enter the harbour at 03:01 on June 1. M-21 was eventually cornered and sunk at 05:15 on June 1 in Taylors Bay inside Sydney Harbour. When the wreck was raised on June 4, both torpedoes had been fired. However the bow caps covering the torpedo tubes failed to drop clear, instead remaining caught in the buckled bow cage of the submarine. The No. 1 torpedo travelled approximately three feet clear of the tube before jamming. The No. 2 torpedo travelled 18 inches (460 mm) before it too jammed.

== Bibliography ==
- Elbourne, Sean (Winter 2006). "Wonderful Kuttabul - a long history of service" (PDF). Sea Talk (Winter 2006). Royal Australian Navy. pp. 11–19. Archived from the original (PDF) on 2008-10-04.
- Grose, Peter (2007). A Very Rude Awakening. Crows Nest: Allen & Unwin. ISBN 978-1-74175-219-9.
