= Commander Naval Forces Marianas =

U.S. Navy force shore commander for activities in Guam and Northern Marianas region

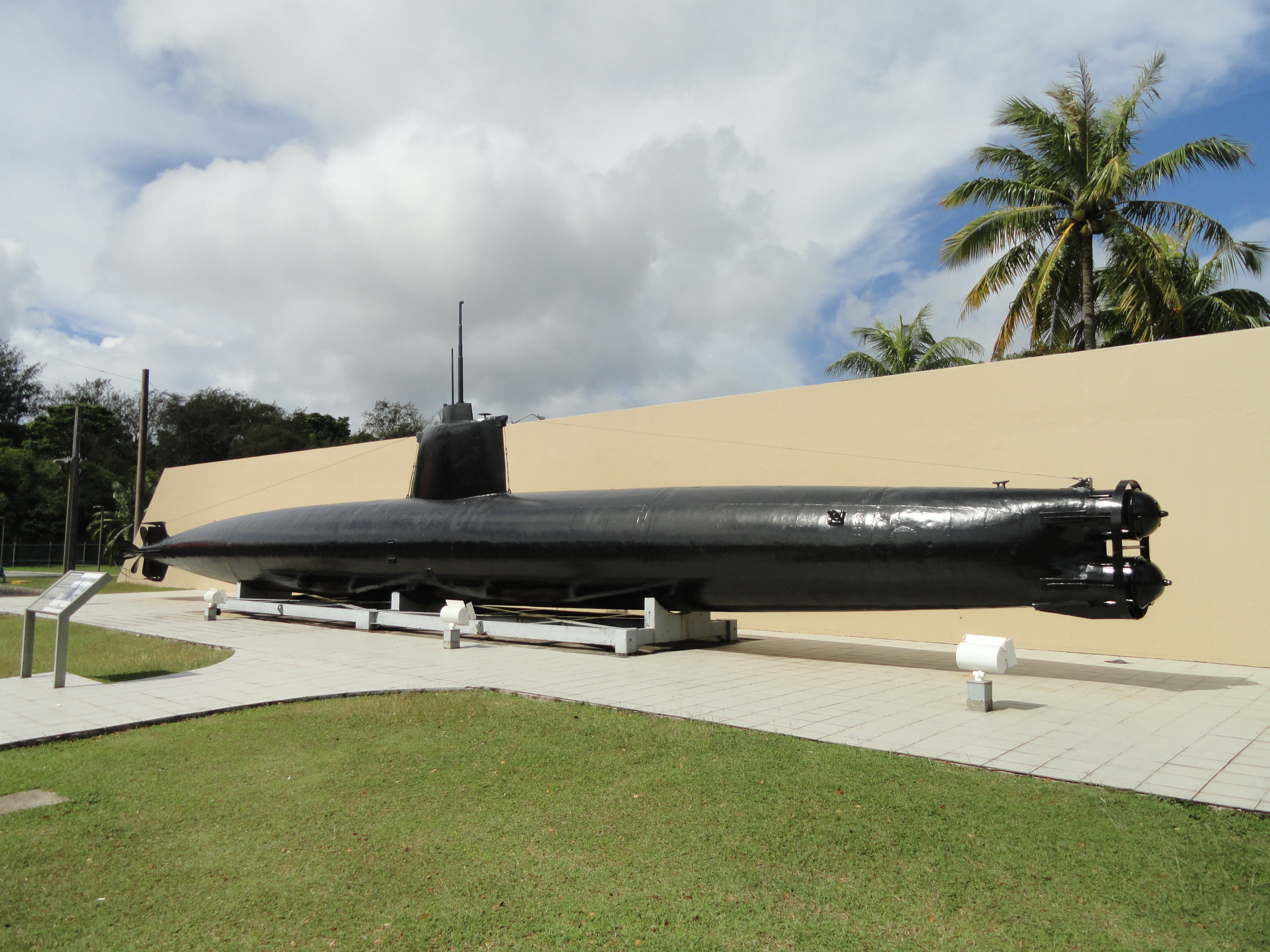
Ha. 62-76 Japanese Midget Attack Submarine captured in 1944, on Comnavmarianas grounds

The Commander Naval Forces Marianas, also known as COMNAVMARIANAS, is the Navy force shore commander responsible for United States Navy activities in Guam, Saipan, Tinian and the surrounding islands, and is a Rear Admiral. COMNAVMARIANAS is currently a shared position of Commander, Joint Region Marianas.

From 1944 to 1949, an era of military government, the officers who served as COMNAVMARIANAS were respectively charged with such civil responsibilities as governor of the Marshalls-Gilberts; deputy military governor, Pacific Ocean Areas; and deputy military governor, Bonin-Volcano Islands.

From 1944 until March 29, 1952, Naval Station served as a Naval Operations Base, providing a huge portion of every type of fleet service. In September 1956, the Naval Base was disestablished and the Naval Station was reassigned to the military command of Commander, U.S. Naval Forces Marianas.

The Navy and Air Force held a groundbreaking ceremony for a combined headquarters at Nimitz Hill on February 6, 2009, signalling the beginning of Joint Region Marianas. The creation of a joint region is mandated by Base Realignment and Closure (BRAC) 2005 but is also unique to Guam. That means at least two military bases, possibly of different services, will be combined to create one base. The naval and air force bases will retain separate base commanders who will oversee operations and mission requirements for their respective installations. Joint Region Marianas will be responsible for all support management functions.
