= Kō-hyōteki-class submarine =

World War II Japanese submarine class

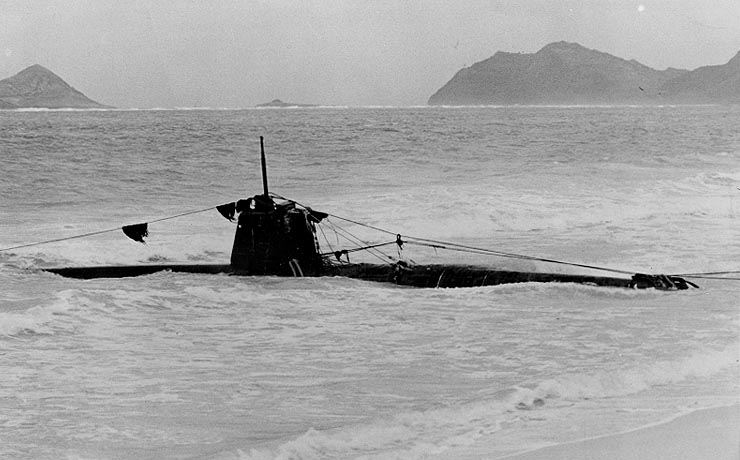
- Type A Ko-hyoteki-class submarine, No.19, grounded in the surf on Oʻahu after the attack on Pearl Harbor, December 1941

Class overview
- Operators: Empire of Japan
- Succeeded by: Kairyū-class submarine
- Subclasses: Type 'A'; Type 'B'; Type 'C'; Type 'D' Kōryū
- Planned: 3 × prototypes; 51 × Type 'A'; 0 × Type 'B'; 47 × Type 'C'; 496 x Type 'D'
- Completed: 216; 1 × First prototype; 2 × Second prototype; 46 × Type 'A'; 5 × Type 'B'; 47 × Type 'C'; 115 x Type 'D'

General characteristics (Type A)
- Type: midget submarine
- Displacement: 46 long tons (47 t) submerged
- Length: 23.9 m (78 ft 5 in)
- Beam: 1.8 m (5 ft 11 in)
- Height: 3 m (9 ft 10 in)
- Propulsion: 192 trays of two two-volt cells each, 136 trays forward; 56 trays aft; 1 × electric motor, 600 hp (447 kW) at 1800 rpm; 2 × screws counter-rotating on single shaft; leading prop 1.35 m diameter, right-handed; trailing prop 1.25 m diameter, left-handed
- Speed: 23 knots (43 km/h; 26 mph) surfaced; 19 knots (35 km/h; 22 mph) submerged
- Range: 100 nmi (190 km) at 2 kn (3.7 km/h; 2.3 mph); 80 nmi (150 km) at 6 kn (11 km/h; 6.9 mph); 18 nmi (33 km) at 19 kn (35 km/h; 22 mph)
- Test depth: 30 m (98 ft)
- Complement: 2
- Armament: 2 × 450 mm (17.7 in) torpedoes, muzzle-loaded into tubes; 1 × 140 kg (300 lb) scuttling charge
- Notes: Ballast: 2,670 kg (5,890 lb) in 534 × 5 kg lead bars

The Kō-hyōteki (甲標的, Kō-hyōteki; Target 'A') class was a class of Japanese midget submarines used during World War II. They had hull numbers but no names. For simplicity, they are most often referred to by the hull number of the mother submarine. Thus, the midget carried by I-16-class submarine was known as I-16's boat, or "I-16tou".

This class was divided in four types: Type A Kō-hyōteki (甲標的甲型, Kō-hyōteki kō-gata; Target 'A', Type 'A'), Type B Kō-hyōteki (甲標的乙型, Kō-hyōteki otsu-gata; Target 'A', Type 'B'), Type C Kō-hyōteki (甲標的丙型, Kō-hyōteki hei-gata; Target 'A', Type 'C'), and Type D Kō-hyōteki (甲標的丁型, Kō-hyōteki tei-gata; Target 'A', Type 'D'), the last one better known as Kōryū (蛟龍).

== History ==
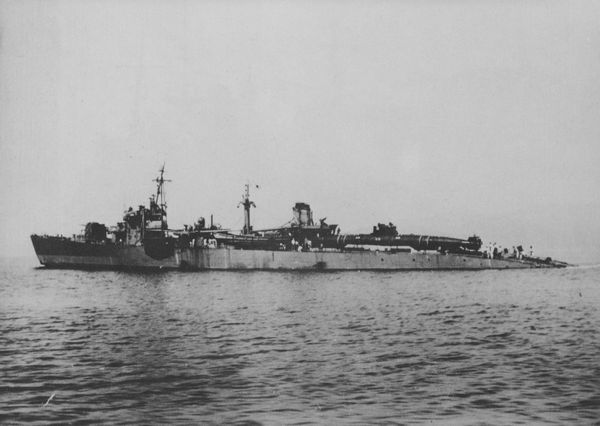
Japanese Landing ship No.5 carried Type 'C' No.69.

Fifty were built. The "A Target" name was assigned as a ruse: if their design were prematurely discovered by Japan's foes, the Japanese Navy could insist that the vessels were battle practice targets. They were also called "Tubes" (筒, Tou) or "Target" (的, Teki, abbreviation of 'Hyōteki') and other nicknames.

The first two, No.1 and No.2, were used only in testing. They did not have conning towers, which were added to the later boats for stability under water.

No.19 was launched by I-24 at Pearl Harbor. Most of the other 50 are unaccounted for, although three were captured in Sydney (Australia), and others in Guam, Guadalcanal, and Kiska Island, accounting for some of the other hull numbers.

The submarines were each armed with two 450 mm (17.7 in.) torpedoes in muzzle-loading tubes one above the other at the bow. In the Pearl Harbor attack, the specially designed Type 97 torpedo was used, with a 772 pounds (350 kg) warhead and a range of 3.4 miles (5.5 km) at 44 knots (81 km/h), but problems with the oxygen flasks which held the air for propulsion meant that all later attacks used a different torpedo. Some have stated that a version of the Type 91 torpedo, designed for aircraft launching, was used, but other reports indicate that the Type 97 torpedo was modified to the Type 98, otherwise known as the Type 97 special. There is no definitive information that the Type 91 was used. The Type 98 was later supplanted by the Type 02 torpedo.

After the war 300 midget submarines of various types were found in various stockpiles in Japan. The submarines were fitted with 1300Ib warheads to be used in suicide attacks. They were intended to ram enemy ships in the event of a mainland invasion but were believed to have never been used.

Each submarine had a crew of two men. A junior officer conned the boat while a petty officer manipulated valves and moved ballast to control trim and diving.

== Pearl Harbor attack ==
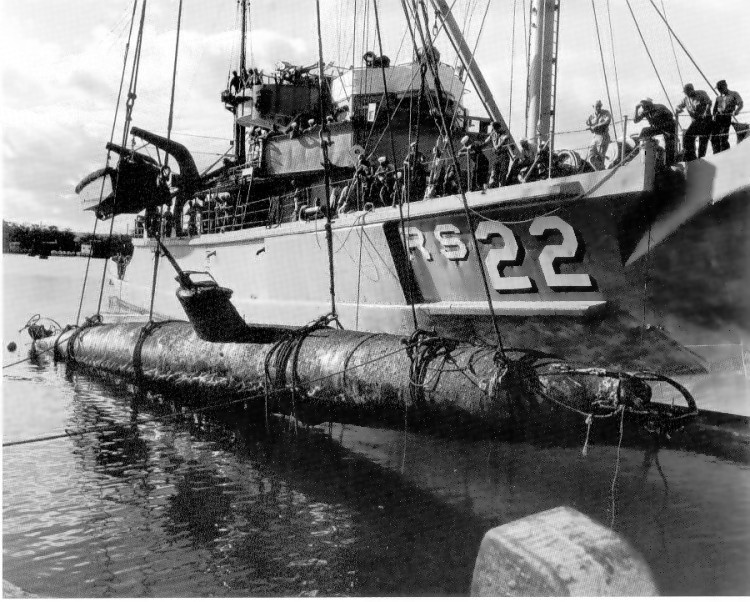
Raising of midget submarine No.18 from Keʻehi Lagoon by USS Current (ARS-22) in 1960

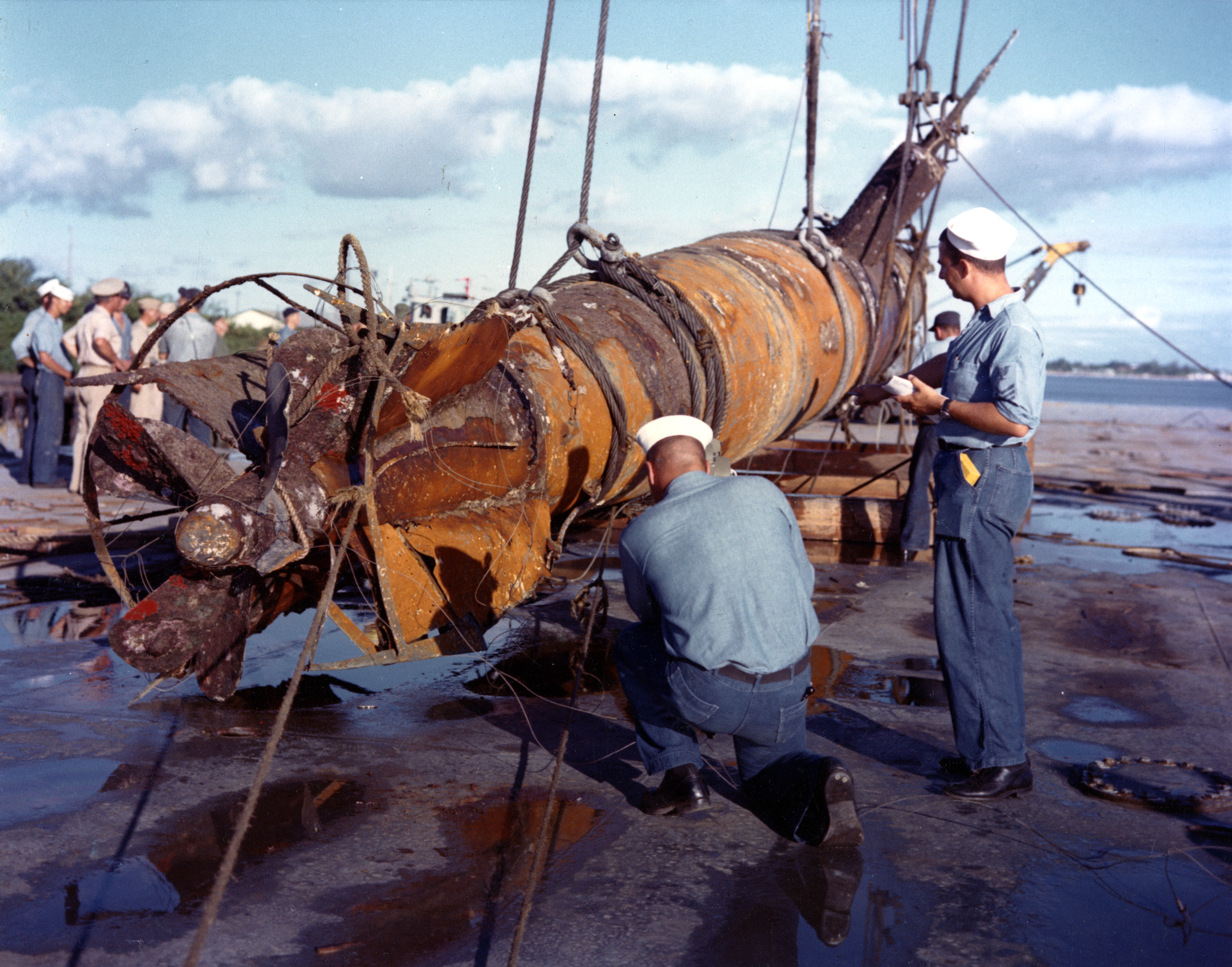
Japanese Type A Midget Submarine recovered in 1960 off Pearl Harbor, Hawaiʻi.

Five of these boats participated in the Pearl Harbor attack, with possibly two actually making it into the harbor. Secret war records show that submarine crews had been ordered to scuttle their subs after the attack and provisions were made to recover stranded crews. Of the five used at Pearl Harbor, No.19 was captured with its pilot Kazuo Sakamaki where it grounded on the east side of Oʻahu. During World War II, No.19 was put on tour across the United States to help sell War Bonds. Now a U.S. National Historic Landmark, No.19 is an exhibit at the National Museum of the Pacific War in Fredericksburg, Texas.

A second Pearl Harbor midget submarine, No.18, was located by U.S. Navy divers and U.S. Marine divers in training including Laurence McInnis and Fred Stock of the A Company, 3rd Recon Battalion, off Keʻehi Lagoon east of the Pearl Harbor entrance on 13 June 1960. The submarine had been damaged by a depth charge attack and abandoned by its crew before it could fire its torpedoes. It is unknown what happened to its two crew as their bodies were never found. This submarine was restored and placed on display at the Naval Academy Etajima 15 March 1962.

The midget submarine attacked by Ward (DD-139) at 6:37 a.m. on 7 December, No.20, was located in 400 meters (1,312 feet) of water five miles outside Pearl Harbor by a University of Hawaiʻi research submersible on 28 August 2002. It was visited at approximately 6:30 a.m. local time, by an Okeanos explorer ROV, on 7 December 2016, 75 years after it was sunk.

A fourth submarine, No.22, entered the harbor and fired its torpedoes at Curtiss (AV-4) and Monaghan (DD-354). Both of those torpedoes missed and are believed to have hit a dock at Pearl City and the shore of Ford Island. This submarine was sunk by Monaghan at 8:43 a.m. on 7 December and later recovered and used as fill during construction of a new landside pier at the Pearl Harbor submarine base. The hulk was uncovered again in 1952 but was so badly corroded by chlorine gas from the electrical batteries that it was again reburied at the same location. The crew's remains are still entombed in the submarine.

Japanese forces received a radio message believed to be from the fifth submarine, No. 16 at 00:41 on 8 December claiming damage to one or more large warships inside Pearl Harbor. At 22:41 on 7 December, they received a message from No. 16 describing the air attack on Pearl Harbor as successful, and at 00:51 on 8 December they received another message that read "Unable to navigate." They never heard from No. 16 again. In 1992, 2000, and 2001, Hawaiʻi Undersea Research Laboratory's submersibles found the wreck of a midget sub lying in three parts three miles south of the Pearl Harbor entrance. The wreck was in the debris field where much surplus U.S. equipment was dumped from the West Loch Disaster of 1944, including vehicles and landing craft. In 2009, a research team assembled by the PBS television series Nova positively identified the sub as being the last, No.16, of the 5 Ko-Hyoteki that participated in the 7 December 1941, attack, piloted by Ensign Masaji Yokoyama and Petty Officer 2nd Class Sadamu Kamita. Both of its torpedoes were missing, indicating that the midget sub may have fired its torpedoes prior to its sinking. Although this correlates with reports of two torpedoes fired at the light cruiser St. Louis at 10:04 at the entrance of Pearl Harbor, and a possible torpedo fired at destroyer Helm at 08:21, there is dispute over this official chain of events; the "torpedo" that St. Louis saw was also reportedly a porpoising minesweeping float being towed by the destroyer Boggs. Some have suggested that circumstantial evidence supports a hypothesis that No.16 successfully entered Pearl, fired its torpedoes at Battleship Row, and fled to the relative quiet of neighboring West Loch, and possibly was scuttled by its crew. When a series of explosions sank an amphibious fleet being assembled in the Loch in 1944, it is suggested the remains of the sub were collected and dumped in the subsequent salvage operation, which was kept classified as secret until 1960. A photograph taken from a Japanese plane during the Pearl Harbor attack shows what might have been No.16 inside the harbor firing its torpedoes at Battleship Row. The photo was declassified in the 1990s and publicized in the 2000s to the public. The sinking of the USS West Virginia and capsizing of the USS Oklahoma may have been accelerated by a torpedo hit from a submarine-launched torpedo, the warheads of which were larger than the aerial torpedoes. Some believe that in the photo, where the torpedoes' paths had supposedly started, were sprays that indicated a midget-submarine rocking up and down due to the force of the torpedo being launched, causing the propellers of the stern to be exposed, kicking up clouds of water spray. A war time report from Admiral Nimitz confirmed the recovery of at least one dud torpedo of the type employed by the midget submarines. The theory is covered in the Nova episode Killer Subs in Pearl Harbor and companion website, I-16tou.com.

== Attacks on Sydney ==
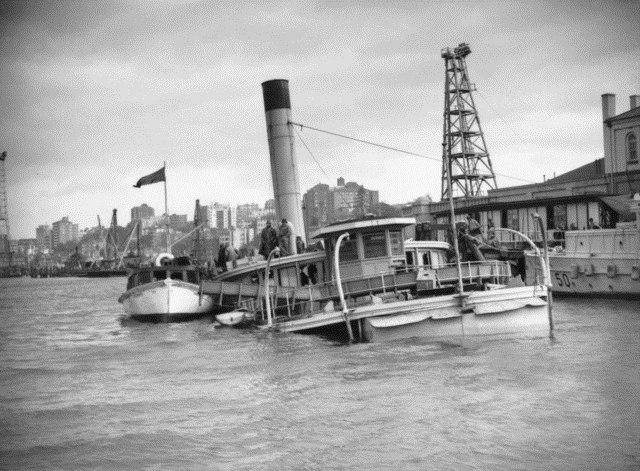
HMAS Kuttabul after sinking.

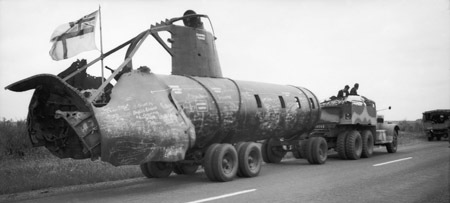
The two midget submarines sunk in Sydney Harbour were used to construct a composite midget submarine which toured Australia during the war.

On the night of 29 May 1942, five large Japanese submarines positioned themselves 56 kilometres north-east of Sydney Heads. At 3 a.m. the next day one of the submarines launched a reconnaissance aircraft. After circling Sydney Harbour the aircraft returned to its submarine, reporting the presence of 'battleships and cruisers' moored in the harbour. The flotilla's commanding officer decided to attack the harbour with midget submarines the next night. The next day the five submarines approached to within 11 kilometres of Sydney Heads, and at about 4:30 p.m. they released three midget submarines, which then began their approach to Sydney Harbour.

The outer-harbour defences detected the entry of the first midget submarine, No.14, at about 8 pm, but it was not identified until it became fouled inside the still incomplete anti-submarine boom net laid across the harbour between Georges Head and Green Point near Watsons Bay. Raising out of the water and being spotted by surface vessels, the submarine's two crew members destroyed their vessel with demolition charges, killing themselves, before HMAS Yarroma was able to open fire.

The second submarine, No.24b, entered the harbour at about 9.48 p.m. and headed west towards the Sydney Harbour Bridge, following a Manly ferry through the anti-submarine boom net, crossing the Indicator Loop system and causing a general alarm to be issued by the Naval Officer in Charge, Sydney. About 200 metres from Garden Island the submarine was fired on by the heavy cruiser USS Chicago. The submarine then fired its two torpedoes at the cruiser. One torpedo ran ashore on Garden Island, but failed to explode. The other passed under the Dutch submarine K9 and struck the harbour bed beneath the depot ship HMAS Kuttabul where it exploded, killing 21 sailors (19 Royal Australian Navy and 2 Royal Navy). The submarine then slipped out of the harbour, its mission complete, though never making it to the planned rendezvous point immediately south of Port Hacking, sinking under unknown circumstances about 30 km north of the harbour and 5 km to seaward. The wreck was found in November 2006. It is now protected as a war grave.

The third submarine, No.21, was sighted by HMAS Yandra at the entrance to the harbour and was depth-charged. Some four hours later, having recovered, it entered the harbour, sustained damage preventing the two torpedoes from launching. It was subsequently attacked with depth charges and sunk in Taylor Bay by vessels of the Royal Australian Navy. Both members of the submarine's crew committed suicide.

The two submarines that were recovered were identical, and their remains were used to reconstruct a complete submarine, which toured New South Wales, Victoria and South Australia before being delivered to the Australian War Memorial in Canberra in 1943, where it remains on display.

== Attacks on Madagascar ==
On 29 May 1942, the Japanese submarines I-10, I-16 and I-20 arrived at Madagascar. I-10's reconnaissance plane spotted Revenge-class battleship HMS Ramillies at anchor in Diego Suarez harbor but the plane was spotted and Ramillies changed her berth. I-20 and I-16 launched two midget submarines, one of which managed to enter the harbor and fired two torpedoes while under depth charge attack from two corvettes. One torpedo seriously damaged Ramillies, while the second sank the 6,993 ton oil tanker British Loyalty (later refloated). Ramillies was later repaired in Durban and Plymouth.

Saburo Akieda (left) Masami Takemoto (right)

The crew of one of the submarines, Lieutenant Saburo Akieda and Petty Officer Masami Takemoto, beached their submarine (No.20b) at Nosy Antalikely and moved inland towards their pick-up point near Cape Amber. They were informed upon when they bought food at a village and both were killed in a firefight with Royal Marines three days later. The second midget submarine, No.16b, was lost at sea and the body of one of its crew was found washed ashore a day later.

== Characteristics ==
according to Rekishi Gunzō
Type		First prototype	Second prototype (Prod. No. 1–2)	Type A (Prod. No. 3–52)	Type B (Prod. No. 49–53)	Type C (Prod. No. 54–100)
Displacement submerged		41.525 long tons (42 t)	44.150 long tons (45 t)	46 long tons (47 t)	47 long tons (48 t)	49.09 long tons (50 t)
Length (overall)		23.3 m (76 ft 5 in)	23.9 m (78 ft 5 in)	23.9 m (78 ft 5 in)	24.9 m (81 ft 8 in)	24.9 m (81 ft 8 in)
Beam		1.824 m (5 ft 11.8 in)	1.85 m (6 ft 1 in)	1.85 m (6 ft 1 in)	1.85 m (6 ft 1 in)	1.88 m (6 ft 2 in)
Draft		3.074 m (10 ft 1.0 in)	3.1 m (10 ft 2 in)	3.4 m (11 ft 2 in)	3.4 m (11 ft 2 in)	3.43 m (11 ft 3 in)
Draught		1.854 m (6 ft 1.0 in)	1.88 m (6 ft 2 in)	1.88 m (6 ft 2 in)	1.85 m (6 ft 1 in)	1.88 m (6 ft 2 in)
Propulsion		224 × Type 'B' special rechargeable batteries, electric motor (600 bhp), single shaft, contra-rotating propellers	224 × Type 'D' special rechargeable batteries, electric motor (600 bhp), single shaft, contra-rotating propellers	224 × Type 'D' special rechargeable batteries, electric motor (600 bhp), single shaft, contra-rotating propellers	224 × Type 'D' special rechargeable batteries, electric motor (600 bhp), 1 × electric generator (40 bhp), single shaft, contra-rotating propellers	208 × Type 'D' special rechargeable batteries, electric motor (600 bhp), 1 × electric generator (40 bhp), single shaft, contra-rotating propellers
Speed	Surfaced	no data	no data	no data	6 knots (11 km/h)	6 knots (11 km/h)
Speed	Submerged	25 knots (46 km/h)	25 knots (46 km/h)	19.0 knots (35.2 km/h)	19.0 knots (35.2 km/h)	18.5 knots (34.3 km/h)
Range	Surfaced	no data	no data	no data	500 nmi (930 km) at 6 knots (11 km/h)	500 nmi (930 km) at 6 knots (11 km/h)
Range	Submerged	no data	no data	15.8 nmi (29.3 km) at 9 knots (17 km/h); 84 nmi (156 km) at 6 knots (11 km/h)	15.8 nmi (29.3 km) at 9 knots (17 km/h); 84 nmi (156 km) at 6 knots (11 km/h)	15.4 nmi (28.5 km) at 8.5 knots (15.7 km/h); 120 nmi (220 km) at 4 knots (7.4 km/h)
Test depth		100 m (330 ft)	100 m (330 ft)	100 m (330 ft)	100 m (330 ft)	100 m (330 ft)
crew		2	2	2	2	3
Armament		2 × 533 mm (21 in) Type 89 torpedoes	2 × 450 mm (18 in) Type 97 torpedoes	2 × 450 mm (18 in) Type 97 torpedoes, later replaced Type 2 Torpedo	2 × 450 mm (18 in) Type 2 torpedoes	2 × 450 mm (18 in) Type 2 torpedoes
Builder		Kure Naval Arsenal	Kure Naval Arsenal	Karasukojima Naval Armory (Production number 3–20) 'P' (Ōurasaki) Naval Armory (Production number 21–52)	'P' Naval Armory	'P' Naval Armory
Number built		1	2	50; Production number 49–52 were rebuilt to the Type 'B' in 1943, some boats rebuilt to the Type 'A' trainer.	5 Production number 49–52 were rebuilt from the Type 'A'.	47; Approx. 10 boats were rebuilt to the Type 'C' trainer.
Building period		1932–1933	1938–1940	1940–1943	1943	1943–1944

== Survivors ==
There are the remains of one in the open at Kiska in the Aleutian Islands, and some in the waters nearby.

There are four reasonably intact Type A midgets on display in the world:

- HA-8 – Submarine Force Library and Museum, Groton, Connecticut
- HA-18 – JMSDF Etajima Naval Base, Etajima, Japan
- HA-19 – National Museum of the Pacific War, Fredericksburg, Texas
- A composite of two that entered the Sydney harbor in May 1942 – Australian War Memorial, Canberra, Australia

A third such submarine used in the attack at Sydney has been found, but remains in the waters off Sydney, to be left in situ as a war grave.

Type C

- HA. 62-76 - War in the Pacific National Historic Park, Nimitz Hill, Guam, U.S.A. On display in front of the T. Stell Newman Visitor Center. Thought to be the last remaining Type C midget submarine in existence. The submarine was listed on the National Register of Historic Places in 1999.

Ko-hyoteki Gallery
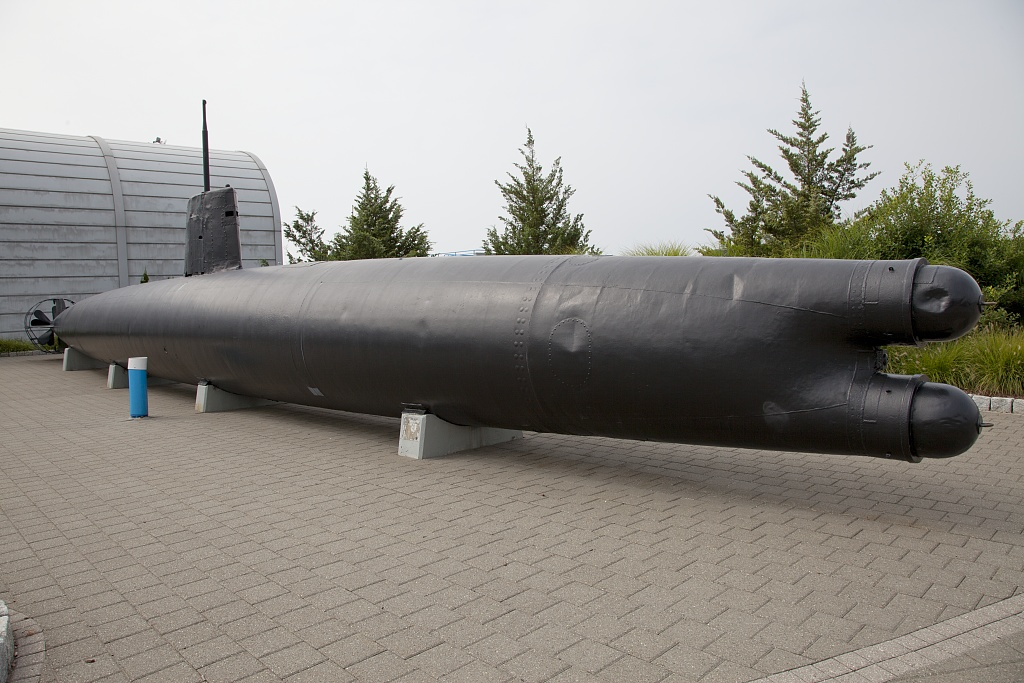
No.8 on display at the Submarine Force Library and Museum

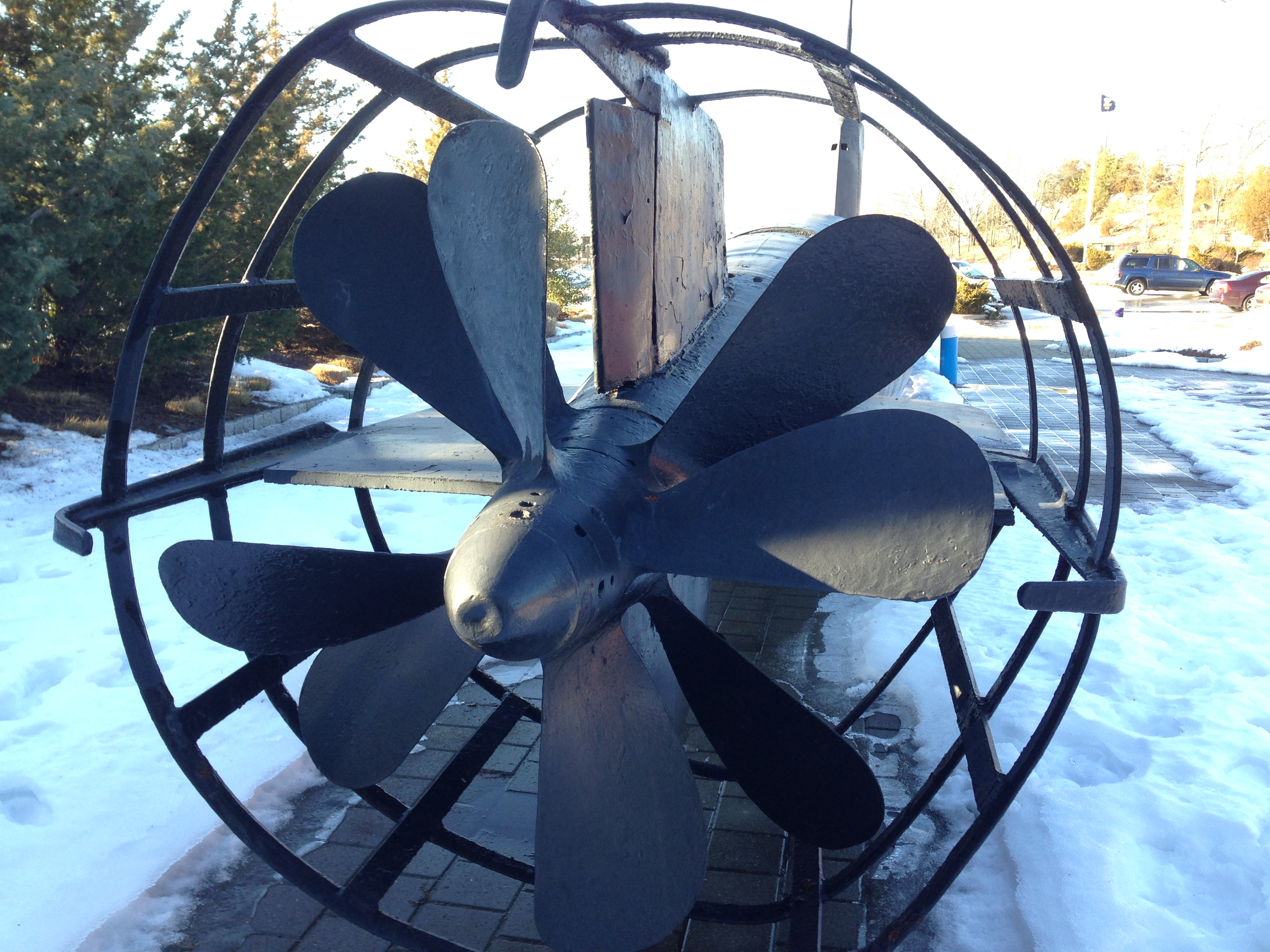
The stern of No.8 showing contra-rotating propellers

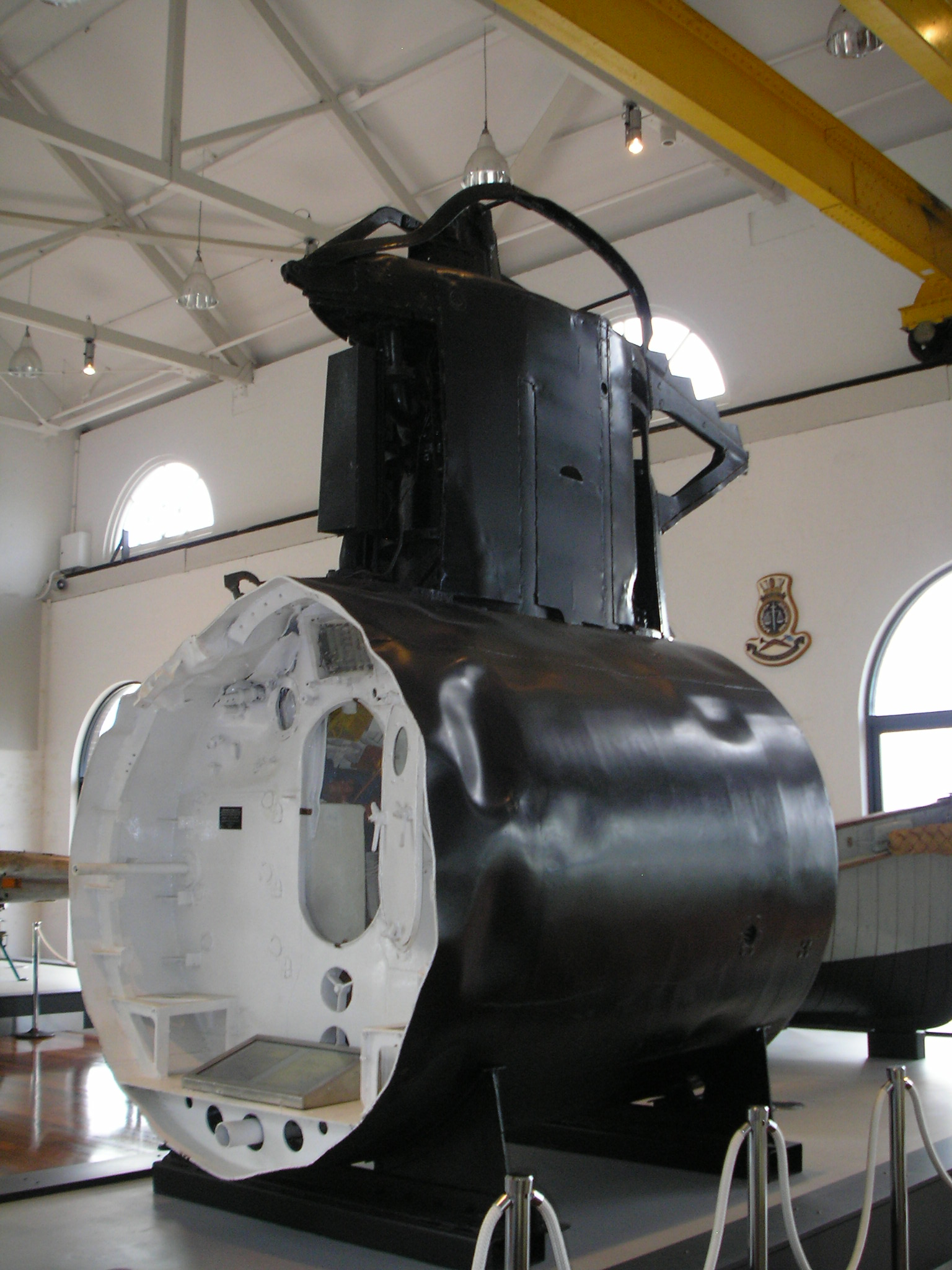
Conning tower section of M22 in Sydney

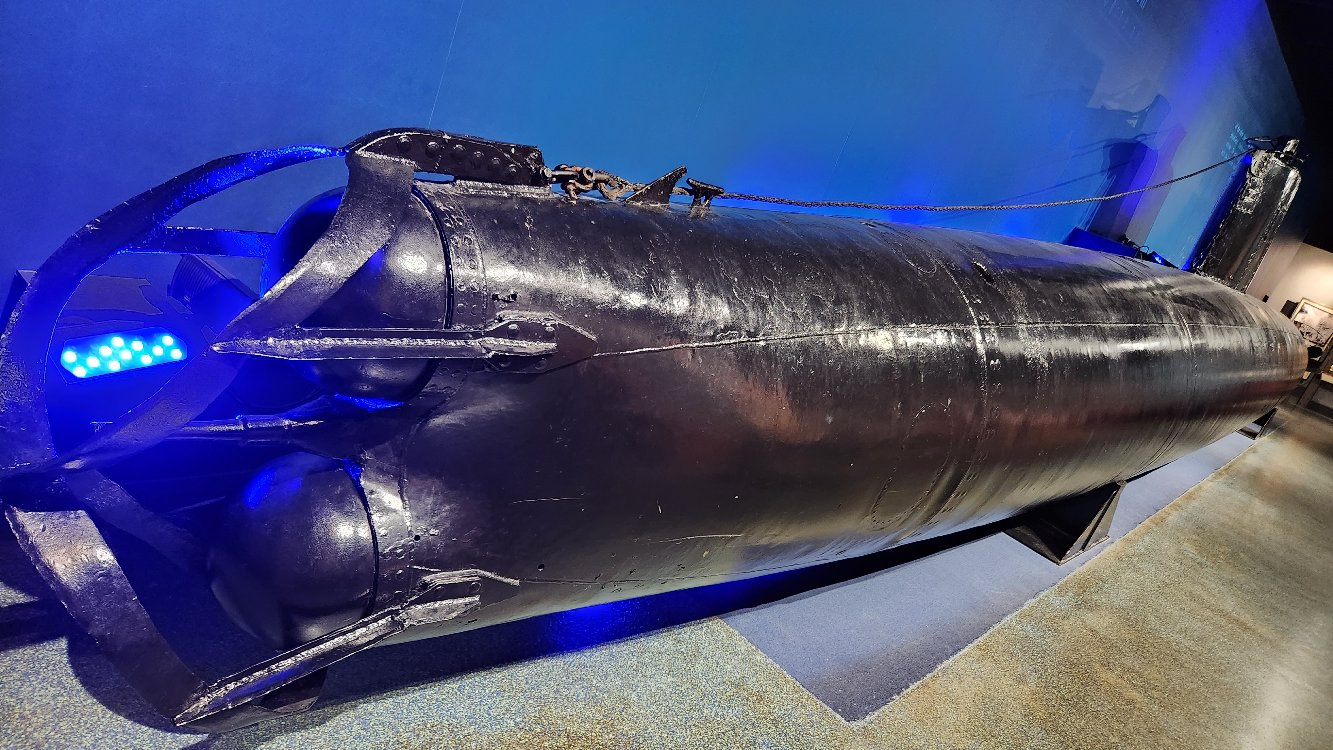
HA-19 at the National Museum of the Pacific War
