= Rooster tail =

Region of turbulence within a fluid

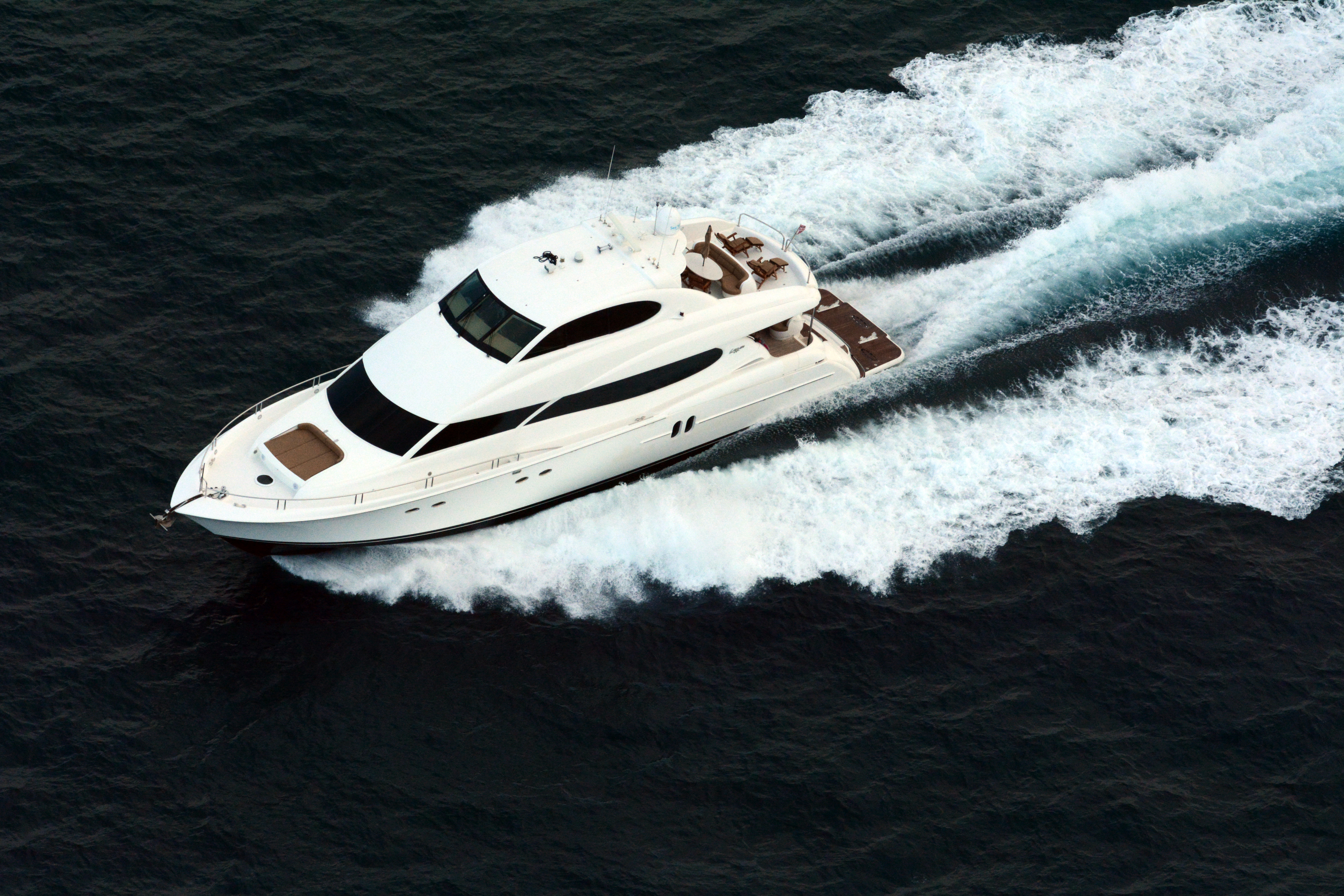
In this image, waves are created within the bow shock near the boat's initial interface with the water, and a rooster tail forms directly behind the boat

A rooster tail is a term used in fluid dynamics, automotive gear shifting, and meteorology. It is a region of commotion or turbulence within a fluid, caused by movement. In fluid dynamics, it lies directly in the wake of an object traveling within a fluid, and is accompanied by a vertical protrusion. If it occurs in a river, wise boaters upstream steer clear of its appearance. The degree of their formation can indicate the efficiency of a boat's hull design. The magnitude of these features in a boat increases with speed, while the relationship is inversely proportional for airplanes. Energetic volcanic eruptions can create rooster tail formations from their ejecta. They can form in relation to coronal loops near the Sun's surface.

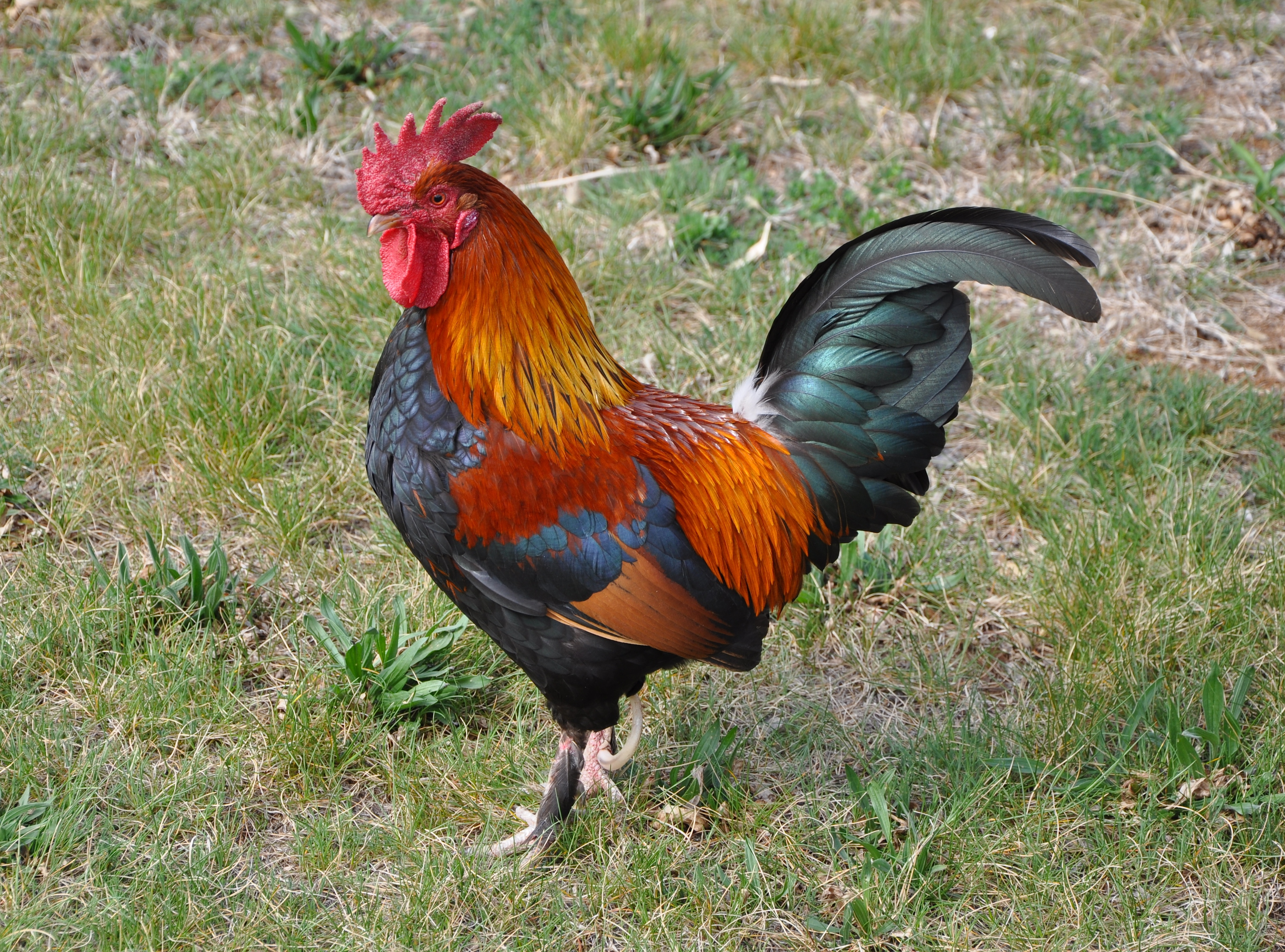
The rooster tail phenomenon is so named because its shape resembles the tail feathers of a rooster.

In gear shifting in motor vehicles, it is the relation between the coefficient of friction and the sliding speed of the clutch. Cars can throw rooster tails in their wake and loose materials under its wheels. In meteorology, a rooster tail satellite pattern can be applied to either low or high level cloudiness, with the low cloud line seen in the wake of tropical cyclones and the high cloud pattern seen either within mare's tails or within the outflow jet of tropical cyclones.

== In fluid dynamics ==
Apollo 16 Commander John Young drives Lunar Rover 002

Rooster tails are caused by constructive interference near and to the wake of objects within a flowing fluid.

=== In water ===
A fast current of water flowing over a rock near the surface of a stream or river can create a rooster tail—such commotions at the water's surface are avoided by boaters due to the near surface obstruction. Propellers on boats can produce a rooster tail of water in their wake, in the form of a fountain which shoots into the air behind the boat. The faster a boat goes, the larger the rooster tails become. The efficiency of a boat's hull design can be judged by the magnitude of the rooster tail—larger rooster tails indicate less efficient designs. If a water skier is in tow, the skis also throw off a rooster tail. Airplanes lifting off from a lake produce lengthening rooster tails behind their amphibious floats as their speed increases, until the plane lifts off the surface.

=== In air ===
An airplane leaves rooster tails in its wake in the form of two circulations at the tip of its wings. As the plane speeds up, the rooster tails become smaller.

=== Related to rock ===
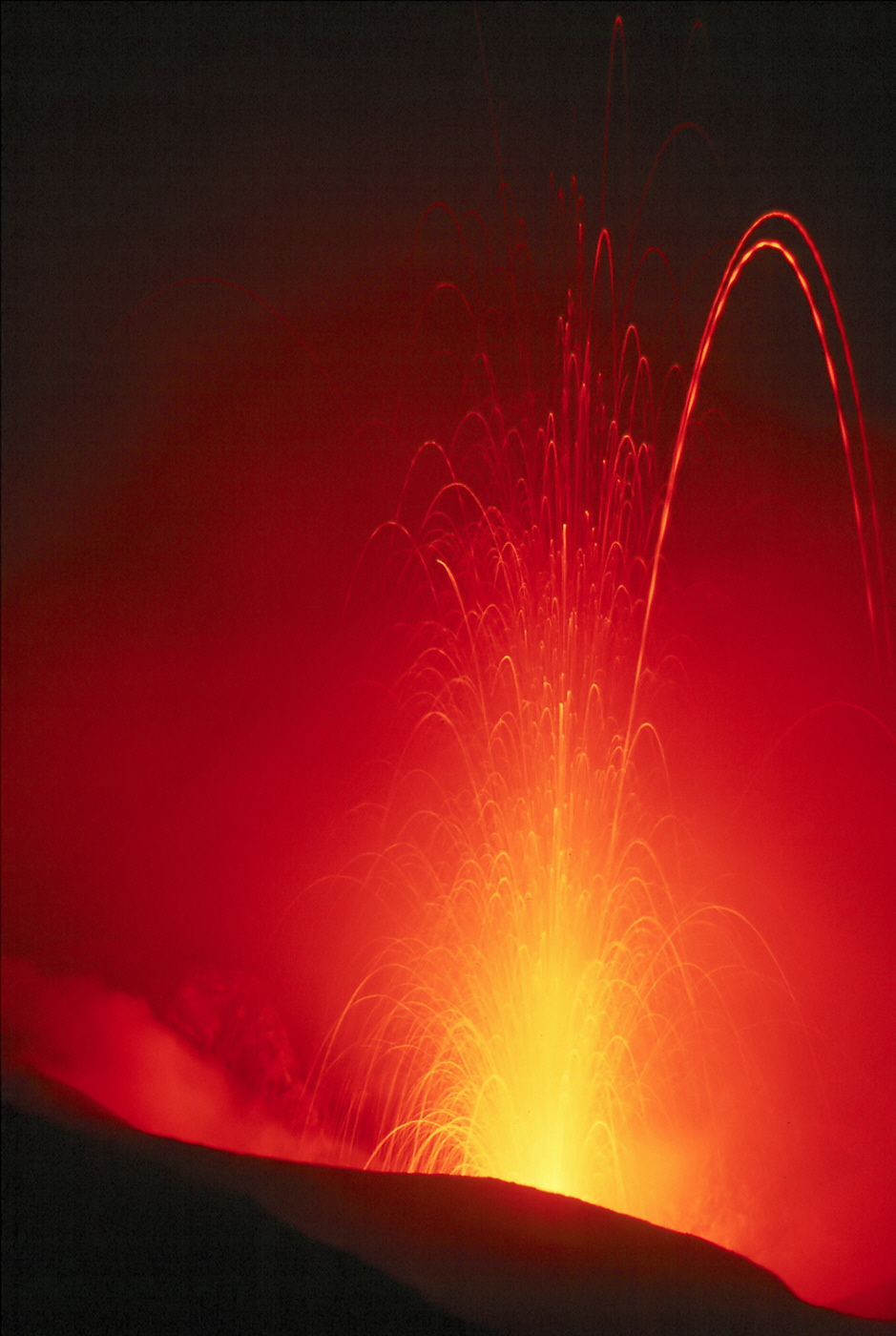
Rooster tail caused by a stromboli eruption

In low gravity and dusty environments, such as the Moon, they can be created by the wheels of moving vehicles. A special energetic volcanic eruption known as a strombolian eruption produces bright arcs of ejecta, referred to as rooster tails, composed of basaltic cinders or volcanic ash.

=== Near the Sun ===
Coronal loops are the basic structures of the magnetic solar corona, the bright area seen around the Sun during solar eclipses. These loops are the closed-magnetic flux cousins of the open-magnetic flux that can be found in coronal hole (polar) regions and the solar wind. Loops of magnetic flux well up from the solar body and fill with hot solar plasma. Due to the heightened magnetic activity in these coronal loop regions, coronal loops can often be the precursor to solar flares and coronal mass ejections (CMEs). Emerging magnetic flux within coronal loops can cause a rooster tail.

== In relation to cars ==
The curve describing the relationship between the coefficient of friction and sliding speed of the clutch in manual transmission automobiles on a graph is known as a rooster tail characteristic. Formations can occur when a car's motor revs up over puddles, loose soil, or mud.

== In meteorology ==
Tropical Storm Pablo (1995) displays a rooster tail in its eastern quadrant. Note the milky area to its east, which contains African dust

Rooster tails have been mentioned in weather satellite interpretation since 2003 connected with tropical cyclones. In the low cloud field, it represents a convergence zone on the westward extent of the Saharan Air Layer seen at the back of tropical cyclones gaining latitude. If there are two systems, the one nearer the pole strengthens, while the system nearest the Equator weakens within an area with downward motion in the mid-levels of the troposphere.

This description has also been used with high cloudiness spreading in a narrow channel towards the Equator within the outflow jet of a tropical cyclone, such as Hurricane Felix (1995). Mare's tail patterns within cirrus clouds are occasionally referred to by this term due to their appearance.
