= Akui N'dekre Elie Moises =

Ivorian footballer

Elie N'dekre
Personal information
- Full name: Elie Moises Akui N'dekre
- Date of birth: January 1, 1992 (age 34)
- Place of birth: Abidjan, Côte d'Ivoire
- Height: 1.85 m (6 ft 1 in)
- Position: Striker

Team information
- Current team: Trélissac

Youth career
- –2004: UE Cerro Penya Blaugrana Trinitat Vella
- 2004–200?: FC Barcelona
- 2008–2009: Sevilla
- 2009–2010: Bohemians 1905

Senior career*
Years	Team	Apps	(Gls)
2010–2011	Alavés B		
2011	Laudio		
2013	JS Kabylie		
2013	Balzan	10	(5)
2013–2015	Bohemians 1905	2	(0)
2015–2016	FS METTA	12	(4)
2017	Hanácká Slavia Kroměříž	14	(06)
2017–	Trélissac		
- * Club domestic league appearances and goals

Elie N'dekre (born January 1, 1992, in Abidjan) is an Ivorian football striker who plays for French club Trélissac.

== Career ==
Elie Moises Akui N'dekre moved to France from Abidjan with his parents at the age of seven in 1999. He played with the academy of Sevilla F.C., before signing with Bohemians 1905, a Czech Republic premiership club. In 2010, he went to Deportivo Alavés B, a Spanish league 2 club. In 2011, N'dekre to Esperence De Tunis, but agreement was not reached.

In 2015, Moises signed with the Latvian club, FS METTA/Latvijas Universitāte.
