= National Museum of the Pacific War =

National Museum of the Pacific War Texas State Historic Site
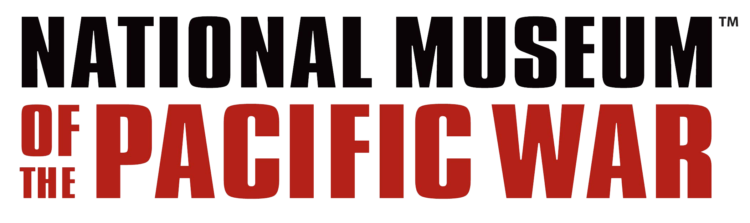

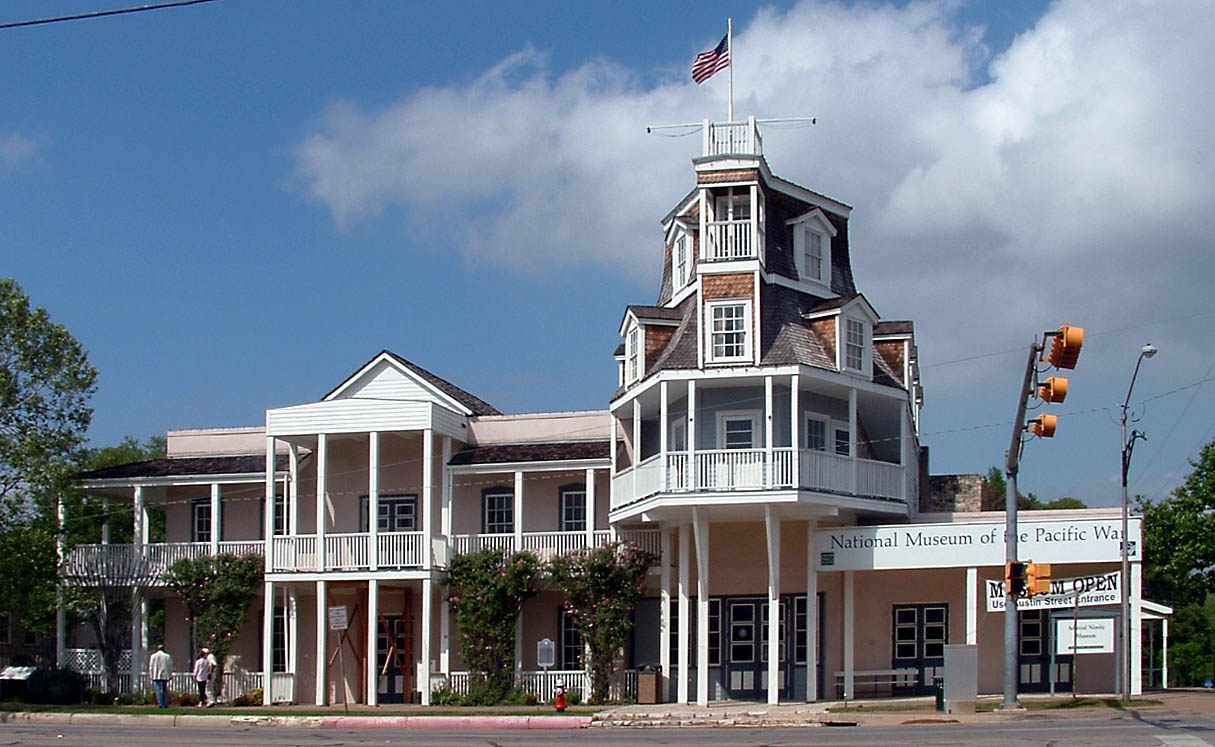

- Location within Texas
- Established: February 24, 1969
- Location: 340 East Austin Street; Fredericksburg, Texas; United States
- Coordinates: 30.2726°N 98.8675°W
- Type: Maritime museum
- Curators: Christine Hicks, Curator; Nicole Bagley, Director of Collections and Exhibitions
- Website: National Museum of the Pacific War

Texas State Antiquities Landmark
- Designated: January 1, 1983
- Reference no.: 8200000278

The National Museum of the Pacific War is located in Fredericksburg, Texas, the boyhood home of Fleet Admiral Chester W. Nimitz. Nimitz served as commander in chief, United States Pacific Fleet (CinCPAC), and was soon afterward named commander in chief, Pacific Ocean Areas, during World War II. The six-acre site includes the Admiral Nimitz Gallery, which is housed in the old Nimitz Hotel and tells the story of Nimitz beginning with his life as a young boy through his naval career as well as the evolution of the old hotel.

== Nimitz Hotel ==
Charles Henry Nimitz, German merchant sailor and grandfather of Fleet Admiral Chester Nimitz, was born in Bremen in Germany. He emigrated to the United States by way of South Carolina in 1844. In 1846, Nimitz moved to Fredericksburg with the initial settlers. In 1848, he married Sophie Dorothea Mueller, and nine of the couple's twelve children lived to adulthood. Local trouble maker James P. Waldrip tried unsuccessfully to recruit Nimitz into Die Haengebande (vigilanty group). Charles Nimitz built the Nimitz Hotel in 1852, and deeded it over to his son Charles H. Nimitz, Jr., in 1906. Locals referred to it as the Steamboat Hotel because of the ship's bow front. The hotel had its own saloon and brewery, a ballroom that doubled as a theatre, a smokehouse, and a bath-house. In its heyday, the hotel hosted such guests as Horace Greeley, Johnny Ringo, President Rutherford B. Hayes, General Robert E. Lee, General James Longstreet, General Phil Sheridan, William Sydney Porter and General Ulysses S. Grant.

Anna Henke Nimitz, the wife of his son Chester Bernard Nimitz became pregnant with their only child Chester William Nimitz. The senior Chester died before his son was born on February 24, 1885. Little Chester's grandfather Charles served as a father figure the first five years of his life. In 1890, the widow Nimitz married her husband's brother William Nimitz and moved with him to Kerrville where he managed the St. Charles Hotel. While still a teenager, Chester was accepted for enrollment in the United States Naval Academy, where he graduated seventh out of a class of 114. Chester Nimitz rose to the rank of Commander-in-Chief of the U.S. Pacific Forces in World War II. Fleet Admiral Nimitz died February 20, 1966.

The Nimitz Hotel was designated an historical marker in 1989, marker number 10089.

== The Museum ==
The Admiral Nimitz Foundation was established in 1964 (as the Fleet Admiral Chester W. Nimitz Naval Museum, Inc.) to support a museum honoring Fredericksburg's native son, Commander-in-Chief of Allied Forces, Pacific Ocean Area.

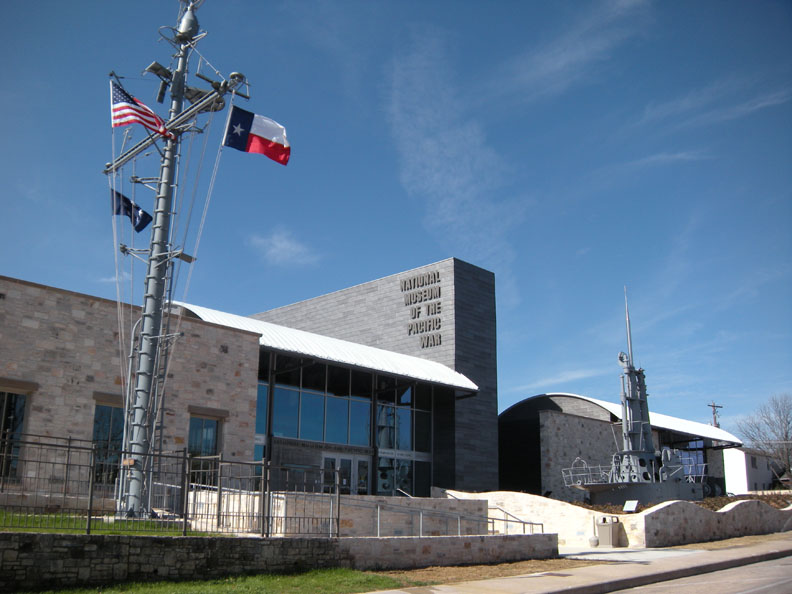
The entrance to the National Museum of the Pacific War

The hotel owned by Nimitz's grandfather Charles Henry Nimitz was restored to its original design and renamed the Admiral Nimitz Museum by an act of the Texas legislature in 1968. The original intent was to focus only as a memorial to Fleet Admiral Chester Nimitz. In 2000, the complex was renamed Admiral Nimitz State Historic Site – National Museum of the Pacific War and is dedicated exclusively to the Pacific Theater battles of World War II. The conning tower and foc'sle of USS Pintado (SS-387) is at the main museum entrance.

The Pacific Combat Zone is a re-creation of a Pacific island battlefield, and includes a Quonset Hut, a PT boat and base, Japanese tank, palm trees, and machine gun placements. Re-enactments, called Living History exhibits, are held throughout the year. The Veterans' Walk of Honor and Memorial Wall can be found within the Memorial Courtyard. Also located at the Pacific Combat Zone, the Quonset Hut now serves as the base for the museum's STEAM Lab.

The Center for Pacific War Studies houses the archive, artifact collection, and the Carl I. Duncan Library. The Center contains thousands of manuscript collections, recordings, photographs, artwork, and publications that can be made available to researchers by appointment. Our research center focuses on educating and inspiring present and future generations about World War II in the Pacific Theater and the relevance of its lessons.

On May 8, 1976, the 130th anniversary of the founding of Fredericksburg, the Japanese government gifted the museum with the Japanese Garden of Peace. The garden was designed by Taketora Saita as a replica of the private garden of Gensui The Marquis Tōgō (1848–1934), the main Imperial Japanese Navy commander in the Russo-Japanese War. Fleet Admiral Nimitz personally admired the Marquis Tōgō, having previously helped to establish a war memorial to the Japanese admiral.

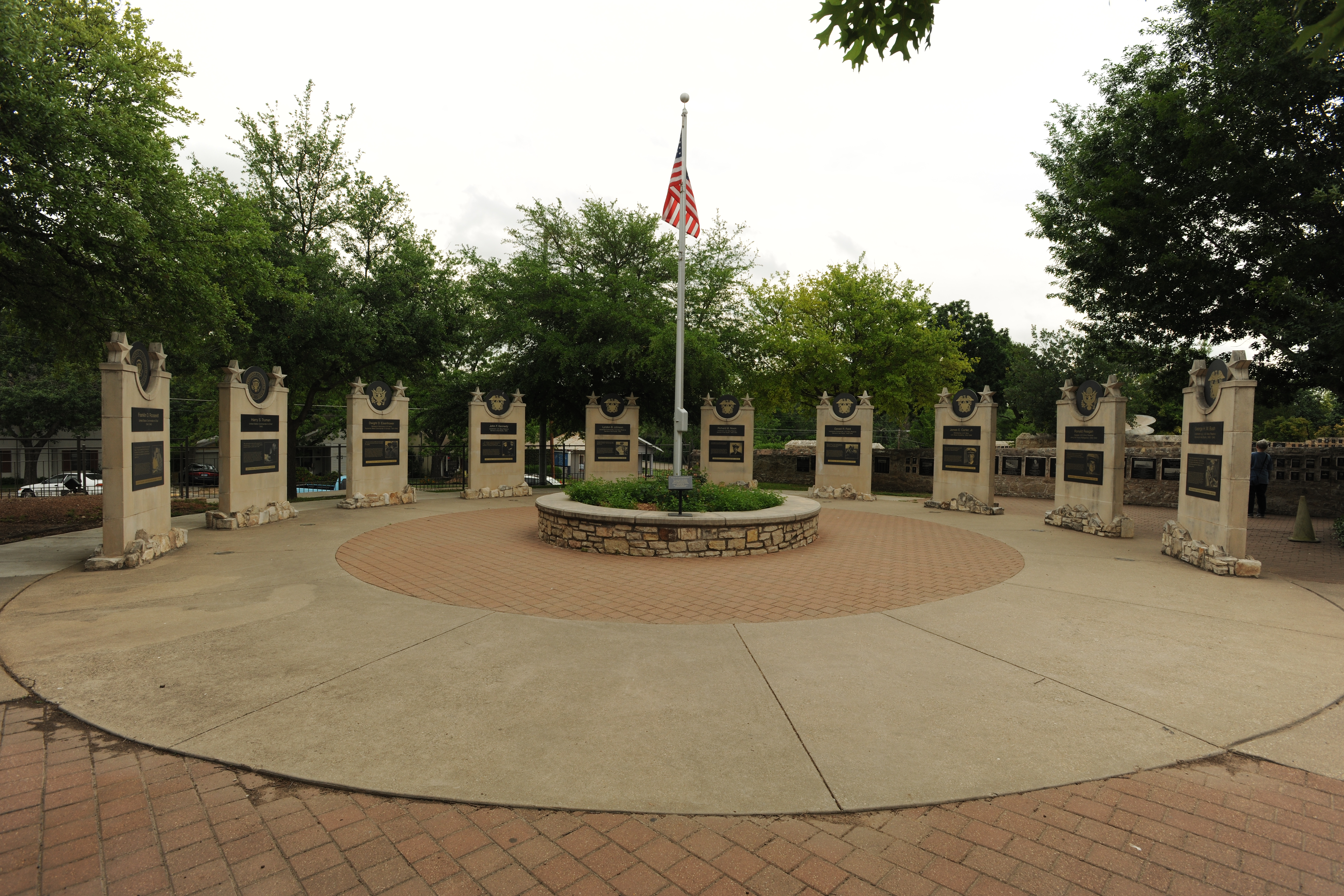
Plaza of the Presidents on the Museum grounds

The outdoor Plaza of the Presidents was dedicated on September 2, 1995, the 50th anniversary of Fleet Admiral Nimitz' acceptance of the Japanese Instrument of Surrender aboard the USS Missouri (BB-63). The plaza is a tribute to the ten United States Presidents who served during World War II: Franklin D. Roosevelt (Commander in Chief), Harry S. Truman (Commander in Chief), General of the Army Dwight D. Eisenhower (Army), John F. Kennedy (Navy), Lyndon B. Johnson (Navy), Richard Nixon (Navy), Gerald Ford (Navy), Jimmy Carter (Navy), Ronald Reagan (Army) and George H. W. Bush (Navy).

George H. W. Bush cut the ribbon in 1991 for the $3 million gallery bearing his name. The George H.W. Bush Gallery is home to an I.J.N. Ko-hyoteki class midget submarine (which participated in the attack on Pearl Harbor), a Japanese Kawanishi N1K "Rex" floatplane, and an American North American B-25 Mitchell. In 1991, the land for the Bush Gallery was bought from H-E-B Grocery. Money for the gallery was privately raised in the 1990s through the efforts of finance chairman Lee Bass and a board that included baseball star Nolan Ryan and Ernest Angelo, a former mayor of Midland. Admission tickets cover both museums. In addition, the museum is currently home to the PT boat PT-309.

Bush later reflected that "terrifying experiences" of war helped him to become a man: "I have often wondered why me, why was I spared when others died."

On December 7, 2009, the museum hosted the Grand Reopening of the newly expanded George H. W. Bush Gallery where the second floor houses the Nimitz Education and Research Center. Former President George H. W. Bush and his wife Barbara, along with Texas Governor Rick Perry, cut the ribbon. The ceremony was attended by survivors of the Attack on Pearl Harbor, and drew a crowd of 5,000 people.

== See also ==
- Imperial War Museum – London, England
- Marine Corps War Memorial – Arlington County, Virginia
- Museum of La Coupole – German-built V-2 launch site in Pas-de-Calais, France
- Museum of the War of Chinese People's Resistance Against Japanese Aggression – Beijing, China
- Museum of The History of Ukraine in World War II – Kyiv, Ukraine
- Museum of World War II – Natick, Massachusetts (Closed in September 2019)
- Museum of the Great Patriotic War – Poklonnaya Gora, Moscow, Russia
- Museum of the Second World War – Gdańsk, Poland
- National D-Day Memorial – Bedford, Virginia
- National World War I Museum – Kansas City, Missouri
- National World War II Memorial – National Mall, Washington, DC
- United States Holocaust Memorial Museum – National Mall, Washington, DC
- American Heritage Museum – Stow, Massachusetts
- The National WWII Museum – New Orleans, Louisiana
- List of museums in Central Texas
- List of Texas state historic sites
- List of maritime museums in the United States
