= List of shipwrecks in the Pacific Ocean =

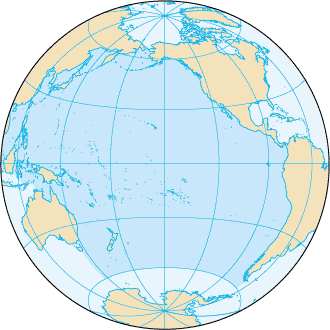
Map of the Pacific Ocean

This is a partial list of shipwrecks which occurred in the Pacific Ocean. The list includes ships that sank, foundered, grounded, or were otherwise lost. The Pacific Ocean is here defined in its widest sense, including its marginal seas: the Bering Sea, Bismarck Sea, Bohol Sea, Celebes Sea, Chilean Sea, Coral Sea, East China Sea, Gulf of Alaska, Java Sea, Philippine Sea, Sea of Japan, Sea of Okhotsk, Seto Inland Sea, Sibuyan Sea, Solomon Sea, South China Sea, Sulu Sea, Tasman Sea, Visayan Sea, and Yellow Sea.

== North Pacific ==
Ship	Flag	Sunk date	Notes	Coordinates
USS Abercrombie	United States Navy	7 January 1968	A John C. Butler-class destroyer escort sunk as a target off San Diego, California, United States.	
USS Acadia	United States Navy	20 September 2010	A Yellowstone-class destroyer tender sunk as a target off Guam.	
USS Admiral W. L. Capps	United States Navy	16 June 2000	An Admiral W. S. Benson-class transport that was sunk as a target.	23°35′01″N 159°50′00.2″W
Agano	Imperial Japanese Navy	15 February 1944	An Agano-class cruiser that was torpedoed by the United States Navy submarine USS Skate 160 nautical miles (296 km; 184 mi) north of Truk.	10°11′N 151°42′E
USS Agerholm	United States Navy	18 July 1982	A Gearing-class destroyer sunk as a target off Los Angeles, California, by the U.S. Navy submarine USS Guitarro.	32°45′N 119°32′W
Akagi	Imperial Japanese Navy	5 June 1942	An aircraft carrier that was scuttled during the Battle of Midway.	30°30′N 178°40′W
Aki	Imperial Japanese Navy	2 September 1924	A Satsuma-class battleship sunk as a target in Tokyo Bay by the Japanese battlecruiser Kongō and battleship Hyūga.	35.025°N 139.856°E
USS Albacore	United States Navy	7 November 1944	A Gato-class submarine sunk by a mine 7 kilometres (4.3 mi) east of Hakodate, Japan.	41°49′N 141°11′E
USS Alfred A. Cunningham	United States Navy	12 October 1979	An Allen M. Sumner-class destroyer sunk as a target off Southern California.	
USS Anderson	United States Navy	1 July 1946	A Sims-class destroyer sunk as a target at Bikini Atoll during the Operation Crossroads atomic bomb tests.	
HMCS Annapolis	Royal Canadian Navy	4 April 2015	A decommissioned Annapolis-class destroyer scuttled to form an artificial reef in Halkett Bay Provincial Park off Gambier Island in Howe Sound, British Columbia, Canada.	49°26′57″N 123°19′51″W
USS Apogon	United States Navy	25 July 1946	A Balao-class submarine sunk as a target at Bikini Atoll during the Operation Crossroads atomic bomb tests.	
ARDC-13	United States Navy	6 August 1946	An auxiliary floating drydock scuttled at Bikini Atoll after sustaining damage on 25 July 1946 in the Operation Crossroads atomic bomb tests.	
USS Arkansas	United States Navy	25 July 1946	A Wyoming-class battleship sunk as a target at Bikini Atoll during the Operation Crossroads atomic bomb tests.	
Asakaze	Imperial Japanese Navy	1 August 1929	A minesweeper, formerly a Kamikaze-class destroyer, sunk as a gunnery target by the Japanese battleships Haruna and Hiei.	
Aso	Imperial Japanese Navy	4 August 1932	A minesweeper, formerly a Bayan-class armored cruiser, torpedoed by a Japanese submarine after use as a gunnery target by the Japanese heavy cruisers Myōkō and Nachi.	
Brant	United States	8 May 1960	An oil exploration survey vessel that burned and sank off Point Conception, California.	
USS Bream	United States Navy	7 November 1969	A Gato-class submarine sunk as a target by the U.S. Navy submarine USS Sculpin off California.	
USS Carlisle	United States Navy	1 July 1946	A Gilliam-class attack transport sunk as a target at Bikini Atoll during the Operation Crossroads atomic bomb tests.	
USS Chauncey	United States Navy	8 September 1923	A Clemson-class destroyer wrecked on Honda Point on the coast of Santa Barbara County, California, in the Honda Point disaster.	33°42′N 145°29′W
Chūyō	Imperial Japanese Navy	4 December 1943	A Taiyō-class escort carrier that was sunk by the United States Navy submarine USS Sailfish off Hachijō-jima.	32°37′N 143°39′E
Coast Trader	United States	7 June 1942	A Design 1023 cargo ship sunk by the Japanese submarine I-26 off the entrance to the Strait of Juan de Fuca, the first American ship sunk off the coast of the State of Washington during World War II.	48°19′N 125°40′W
Constitution	United States	17 November 1997	An ocean liner that sank under tow 700 nautical miles (1,300 km; 810 mi) north of the Hawaiian Islands.	
USS Corvina	United States Navy	16 November 1943	A Gato-class submarine that was torpedoed by the Japanese submarine I-176 south of Truk.	5°5′N 151°10′E
USS Crommelin	United States Navy	19 July 2016	A decommissioned Oliver Hazard Perry-class guided-missile frigate sunk as a target north-northwest of Kauai, Hawaii.	23°00′N 159°55′W
USS Cushing	United States Navy	14 July 2008	A Spruance-class destroyer sunk as a target off Hawaii.	
Cynthia Olson	United States	7 December 1941	A cargo ship sunk by the Japanese submarine I-26 900 nautical miles (1,700 km; 1,000 mi) northeast of Hawaii, the first American merchant ship lost after the entry of the United States into the World War II and the first American merchant ship sunk by a Japanese submarine.	33°42′N 145°29′W
USS David R. Ray	United States Navy	11 July 2008	A Spruance-class destroyer sunk as a target off Hawaii.	
Decommissioned Destroyer No. 15	Imperial Japanese Navy	18 July 1945	A training hulk—a former Urakaze-class destroyer—sunk by Allied aircraft at Yokosuka, Japan, in the attack on Yokohama.	
USS Delphy	United States Navy	8 September 1923	A Clemson-class destroyer wrecked on Honda Point on the coast of Santa Barbara County, California, in the Honda Point disaster.	
USS Denver	United States Navy	22 July 2022	A decommissioned Austin-class amphibious transport dock sunk as a target approximately 50 nmi (93 km; 58 mi) northwest of Kauai, HAwaii.	
USS Devilfish	United States Navy	14 August 1968	A Balao-class submarine sunk as a target off San Francisco, California, by the U.S. Navy submarine USS Wahoo.	37°05′N 124°08′W
USS Dubuque	United States Navy	11 July 2024	A decommissioned Austin-class amphibious transport dock sunk as a target north of Kauai, Hawaii, by a United States Air Force B-2 Spirit bomber.	
USS Durham	United States Navy	30 August 2020	A decommissioned Charleston-class amphibious cargo ship sunk as a target north of Kauai, Hawaii, by the Royal Australian Navy frigate HMAS Stuart and her embarked helicopters.	
EK-3	Soviet Navy	17 November 1948	A Tacoma-class patrol frigate which ran aground on the coast of the Soviet Union on the Kamchatka Peninsula off Petropavlovsk-Kamchatsky and became a total loss.	
USS F-1	United States Navy	17 December 1917	An F-class submarine that sank after colliding with the submarine USS F-3 off Point Loma, San Diego, California.	
USS F-4	United States Navy	25 March 1915	An F-class submarine that sank in a diving accident off Honolulu, Hawaii.	
USS Fife	United States Navy	23 August 2005	A Spruance-class destroyer sunk as a target off Washington.	
USS Fletcher	United States Navy	16 July 2008	A Spruance-class destroyer sunk as a target north-northwest of Kauai, Hawaii.	23°01′02″N 159°59′09″W
USS Fuller	United States Navy	8 September 1923	A Clemson-class destroyer wrecked on Honda Point on the coast of Santa Barbara County, California, in the Honda Point disaster.	
USS Gambier Bay	United States Navy	25 October 1944	A Casablanca-class escort carrier that was sunk in the Battle off Samar.	11°46′N 126°09′E
USS Gilliam	United States Navy	1 July 1946	A Gilliam-class attack transport sunk as a target at Bikini Atoll during the Operation Crossroads atomic bomb tests.	
USS Golet	United States Navy	14 June 1944	A Gato-class submarine sunk by Japanese warships northwest of Honshu.	41°04′N 141°31′E
USS Gudgeon	United States Navy	7 April 1944	A Tambor-class submarine missing after departing Johnston Atoll.	
USS H-1	United States Navy	24 March 1920	An H-class submarine that sank during salvage operations off Magdalena Bay on the coast of the Baja California peninsula, where she had run aground on a shoal on 12 March 1920.	
Ha-101	Imperial Japanese Navy	October 1945	A Sen'yu-Shō-type submarine possibly scuttled off Shimizu, Japan.	
Ha-102	Imperial Japanese Navy	October 1945	A Sen'yu-Shō-type submarine possibly scuttled off Shimizu, Japan.	
Ha-104	Imperial Japanese Navy	October 1945	A Sen'yu-Shō-type submarine possibly scuttled off Shimizu, Japan.	
USS Hammann	United States Navy	6 June 1942	A Sims-class destroyer that was torpedoed by I-168 in the Battle of Midway.	30°36′N 176°34′W
USS Harry W. Hill	United States Navy	15 July 2004	A Spruance-class destroyer sunk as a target off Hawaii.	
Harusame	Imperial Japanese Navy	8 June 1944	A Shiratsuyu-class destroyer that was sunk by US aircraft 30 nautical miles (56 km; 35 mi) northwest of Manokwari, New Guinea.	00°05′S 132°45′E
Hatsuharu	Imperial Japanese Navy	13 August 1928	A Kamikaze-class destroyer sunk as a target by Imperial Japanese Navy aircraft.	
Hayate	Imperial Japanese Navy	11 December 1941	A Kamikaze-class destroyer that was sunk in the Battle of Wake Island.	19°10′N 166°22′E
Hiryū	Imperial Japanese Navy	5 June 1942	An aircraft carrier scuttled northwest of Midway Atoll after U.S. Navy aircraft damaged her in the Battle of Midway.	
USS Hoel	United States Navy	25 October 1944	A Fletcher-class destroyer that was sunk of Samar, Philippines by Japanese warships.	11°46′N 126°33′E
USS Horne	United States Navy	29 June 2008	A Belknap-class guided-missile cruiser sunk as a target off Hawaii.	
I-5	Imperial Japanese Navy	19 July 1944	A Type J1 Mod submarine sunk by the United States Navy destroyer escort USS Wyman 360 nautical miles (670 km; 410 mi) east of Guam.	13°01′N 151°58′E
I-6	Imperial Japanese Navy	16 June 1944	A Type J2 submarine sunk in error by the Japanese armed cargo ship Toyokawa Maru off Yokosuka, Japan.	
I-7	Imperial Japanese Navy	22 June 1943	A Type J3 submarine that ran aground and sank off the coast of Kiska in the Aleutian Islands after suffering heavy damage in combat with the United States Navy destroyer USS Monaghan.	51°49′N 177°20′E
I-10	Imperial Japanese Navy	4 July 1944	A Type A1 submarine sunk by the United States Navy destroyer USS David W. Taylor northeast of Saipan in the Mariana Islands.	15°26′N 147°48′E
I-12	Imperial Japanese Navy	13 November 1944	A Type A2 submarine sunk by the United States Navy minesweeper USS Ardent and patrol frigate USS Rockford 1,000 nautical miles (1,900 km; 1,200 mi) west-southwest of Los Angeles, California.	31°55′N 139°45′W or 31°48′N 139°52′W
I-13	Imperial Japanese Navy	16 July 1945	A Type AM submarine sunk by United States Navy aircraft 550 nautical miles (1,020 km; 630 mi) east of Yokosuka, Japan.	34°28′N 150°55′E
I-14	Imperial Japanese Navy	28 May 1946	A Type AM submarine sunk as a torpedo target by the United States Navy submarine USS Bugara off Pearl Harbor, Hawaii.	21°13′N 158°08′W
I-16	Imperial Japanese Navy	19 May 1944	A Type C1 submarine sunk by the United States Navy destroyer escort USS England 140 nautical miles (260 km; 160 mi) northeast of Cape Alexander on Choiseul in the Solomon Islands.	05°10′S 158°10′E
I-21	Imperial Japanese Navy	29 November 1943	A Type B1 submarine sunk by United States Navy aircraft near Tarawa in the Gilbert Islands.	
I-23	Imperial Japanese Navy	24 February 1942	A Type B1 submarine missing near Oahu, Hawaii.	
I-28	Imperial Japanese Navy	17 May 1942	A Type B1 submarine that was torpedoed by USS Tautog south of Chuuk.	06°30′N 152°00′E
I-32	Imperial Japanese Navy	24 March 1944	A Type B1 submarine sunk 50 nautical miles (93 km; 58 mi) south of Wotje Atoll by the United States Navy destroyer USS Halsey Powell, destroyer escort USS Manlove, and submarine chaser USS PC-1135.	08°30′N 170°10′E
I-35	Imperial Japanese Navy	23 November 1943	A Type B1 submarine sunk by the United States Navy destroyers USS Frazier and USS Meade off Tarawa in the Gilbert Islands.	01°22′N 172°47′E
I-39	Imperial Japanese Navy	26 November 1943	A Type B1 submarine missing after 25 November 1943 and probably sunk by the United States Navy destroyer USS Boyd southwest of Tarawa in the Gilbert Islands on 26 November.	00°31′N 172°16′E
I-40	Imperial Japanese Navy	22 November 1943	A Type B2 submarine missing after departing Truk in the Caroline Islands.	
I-43	Imperial Japanese Navy	15 February 1944	A Type B2 submarine torpedoed by the United States Navy submarine USS Aspro east-southeast of Guam in the Mariana Islands.	10°23′N 150°23′E
I-63	Imperial Japanese Navy	2 February 1939	A Kaidai 3-type submarine sunk in a collision with the Japanese submarine I-60 in the Bungo Strait off Kyushu about 60 nautical miles (110 km; 69 mi) northwest of Mizunokojima Lighthouse.	
I-67	Imperial Japanese Navy	29 August 1940	A Kaidai 5-type submarine that sank in a diving accident off the southern coast of Minamitorishima.	
I-70	Imperial Japanese Navy	10 December 1941	A Kaidai 6-type submarine sunk by United States Navy dive bomber aircraft northeast of the eastern end of Molokai in the Hawaiian Islands. The first Japanese warship sunk by U.S. aircraft during World War II and the first fleet submarine lost in the Pacific campaign of World War II.	23°45′N 155°35′W
I-73	Imperial Japanese Navy	27 January 1942	A Kaidai 6A-type submarine sunk by the United States Navy submarine USS Gudgeon about 240 nautical miles (440 km; 280 mi) west of Midway Atoll in the Northwestern Hawaiian Islands. The first warship ever sunk by a U.S. submarine.	28°24′N 178°35′E
I-165	Imperial Japanese Navy	27 June 1945	A Kaidai 5-type submarine sunk by a United States Navy aircraft east of the Mariana Islands.	15°28′N 153°39′E
I-169	Imperial Japanese Navy	4 April 1944	A Kaidai 6-type submarine that sank in a diving accident in Truk Lagoon northwest of Dublon.	
I-174	Imperial Japanese Navy	12 April 1944	A Kaidai 6B-type submarine sunk by a United States Navy aircraft southeast of Truk.	10°45′N 152°29′E
I-175	Imperial Japanese Navy	4 February 1944	A Kaidai 6B-type submarine sunk by the United States Navy destroyer escort USS Fair 100 nautical miles (190 km; 120 mi) northwest of Jaluit Atoll.	06°48′N 168°08′E
I-201	Imperial Japanese Navy	23 May 1946	A Sentaka-type submarine sunk as a target off Pearl Harbor, Hawaii, by the United States Navy submarine USS Queenfish.	21°13′N 158°08′W
I-203	Imperial Japanese Navy	21 May 1946	A Sentaka-type submarine sunk as a target off Pearl Harbor, Hawaii, by the United States Navy submarine USS Caiman.	21°13′N 158°08′W
I-362	Imperial Japanese Navy	14 January 1945	A Type D1 submarine sunk by the United States Navy destroyer escort USS Fleming in the eastern Caroline Islands.	12°08′N 154°27′E
I-364	Imperial Japanese Navy	16 September 1944	A Type D1 submarine sunk by the United States Navy submarine USS Sea Devil east of the Boso Peninsula, Honshu, Japan.	34°30′N 145°23′E
I-365	Imperial Japanese Navy	29 November 1944	A Type D1 submarine sunk by the United States Navy submarine USS Scabbardfish southeast of Yokosuka, Japan.	34°44′N 141°01′E
I-371	Imperial Japanese Navy	24 February 1945	A Type D1 submarine probably sunk by the United States Navy submarine USS Lagarto in the Bungo Strait.	32°40′N 132°33′E
I-372	Imperial Japanese Navy	18 July 1945	A Type D1 submarine sunk by the United States Navy aircraft at Yokosuka, Japan.	
I-400	Imperial Japanese Navy	4 June 1946	A Sentoku-type submarine sunk as a target off Pearl Harbor, Hawaii, by the United States Navy submarine USS Trumpetfish.	21°13′N 158°07′W
I-401	Imperial Japanese Navy	31 May 1946	A Sentoku-type submarine sunk as a target off Pearl Harbor, Hawaii, by the United States Navy submarine USS Cabezon.	21°1′N 158°07′W
Ikazuchi	Imperial Japanese Navy	13 April 1944	An Akatsuki-class destroyer that was torpedoed by the American submarine USS Harder 200 miles (320 km) southeast of Guam.	10°13′N 143°51′E
Iki	Imperial Japanese Navy	3 October 1915	A coastal defence ship, formerly an Imperator Aleksandr II-class battleship, sunk as a gunnery target by the Japanese battlecruisers Hiei and Kongō.	
USS Independence	United States Navy	29 January 1951	A Independence-class light aircraft carrier scuttled off California near the Farallon Islands.	37°30′N 123°05′W
USS Ingersoll	United States Navy	29 July 2003	A Spruance-class destroyer sunk as a target north northwest of Kauai, Hawaii.	023°02′N 160°04′W
John A. Johnson	United States	29 October 1944	A Liberty ship that was torpedoed and shelled by the Japanese submarine I-12 and split in half.	29°36.30′N 141°43′W
USS John Young	United States Navy	13 April 2004	A Spruance-class destroyer sunk as a target off Hawaii.	
K-129	Soviet Navy	8 March 1968	A Soviet Golf-class submarine which carried three nuclear warheads. The vessel was partially recovered from the seabed in 1974 by the CIA's Project Azorian. USS Halibut allegedly took upwards of 10,000 pictures of the shipwreck. The exact location of the wreck remains an official secret of the United States intelligence services.	
Kaga	Imperial Japanese Navy	4 June 1942	An aircraft carrier sunk by U.S. Nay dive bomber aircraft during the Battle of Midway.	30°23′N 179°17′W
Kaihei Maru	Japan	15 April 1943	A troopship that was torpedoed by the American submarine USS Seawolf.	21°15′N 152°00′E
Kasuga	Imperial Japanese Navy	18 July 1945	A barracks ship sunk at Yokosuka, Japan, during the attack on Yokosuka by U.S. Navy aircraft.	35.3°N 139.667°E
Katori	Imperial Japanese Navy	19 February 1944	A Katori-class cruiser that was sunk by the American battleship USS Iowa off Chuuk.	07°45′N 151°20′E
USS Kete	United States Navy	20 March 1945	A Balao-class submarine missing off the Ryukyu Islands.	
USS Kinkaid	United States Navy	14 July 2004	A Spruance-class destroyer sunk as a target north northwest of Kauai, Hawaii.	22°55′13.5″N 159°59′40.5″W
Kisaragi	Imperial Japanese Navy	11 December 1941	A Mutsuki-class destroyer sunk by depth charges 30 nautical miles (56 km; 35 mi) southwest of Wake Island.	18°55′N 166°17′E
Lahaina	United States	12 December 1941	A cargo ship that was sunk by the Japanese submarine I-9 800 miles (1,300 km) northeast of Honolulu, Hawaii.	
USS Lamson	United States Navy	2 July 1946	A Mahan-class destroyer that sank at Bikini Atoll after sustaining damage as a target in the Operation Crossroads atomic bomb tests.	
USS Leftwich	United States Navy	1 August 2003	A Spruance-class destroyer sunk as a target north northwest of Kauai, Hawaii.	22°48′47″N 160°34′00″W
USS Liscome Bay	United States Navy	24 November 1943	A Casablanca-class escort carrier that was torpedoed by the Japanese submarine I-175 off Makin.	2°34′N 172°30′E
USS LSM-60	United States Navy	25 July 1946	An LSM-1-class landing ship medium obliterated by an atomic bomb suspended beneath her at Bikini Atoll in the Operation Crossroads atomic bomb tests.	
USS LST-563	United States Navy	21 December 1944	An LST-542-class tank landing ship that ran aground on Clipperton Island.	10°18′26.69″N 109°14′5.66″W
Maikaze	Imperial Japanese Navy	17 February 1944	A Kagerō-class destroyer that was sunk by US ships 40 miles (64 km) northwest of Chuuk.	07°45′N 151°20′E
Manini	United States	17 December 1941	A cargo ship that was torpedoed by the Japanese submarine I-75.	
USS Mars	United States Navy	15 July 2006	A Mars-class combat stores ship that was sunk as a target 54 nautical miles (100 km; 62 mi) off Hawaii.	
USCGC Matagorda	United States Coast Guard	1969	A Casco-class United States Coast Guard cutter that was sunk as a target 72 nautical miles (133 km; 83 mi) off Hawaii.	20°08′N 158°30′W
Matsukaze	Imperial Japanese Navy	9 June 1944	A Kamikaze-class destroyer that was torpedoed by the American submarine USS Swordfish 70 miles (110 km) northeast of Chichi-jima, Japan.	26°59′N 143°13′E
USS McClusky	United States Navy	19 July 2018	A decommissioned Oliver Hazard Perry-class guided-missile frigate sunk as a target 55 nmi (102 km; 63 mi) north of Kauai, Hawaii.	
USS Merrill	United States Navy	1 August 2003	A decommissioned Spruance-class destroyer sunk as a target north-northwest of Kauai, Hawaii.	22°43′53″N 160°29′23″W
Michel	Kriegsmarine	17 October 1943	An auxiliary cruiser torpedoed by the American submarine USS Tarpon southeast of Tokyo.	33°42′0″N 140°08′0″E
Mikuma	Imperial Japanese Navy	6 June 1942	A Mogami-class cruiser sunk by U.S. aircraft during the Battle of Midway.	29°20′N 173°30′E
USS Milwaukee	United States Navy	13 January 1917	A St. Louis-class protected cruiser wrecked at Samoa Beach off Eureka, California.	40°48′44″N 124°11′54″W
Mizuho	Imperial Japanese Navy	2 May 1942	A seaplane carrier torpedoed by the U.S. Navy submarine USS Drum 40 nautical miles (74 km; 46 mi) off Omaezaki, Japan.	
USS Mobile Bay	United States Navy	12 July 2026	A decommissioned Ticonderoga-class guided-missile cruiser sunk as a target 50 nmi (93 km; 58 mi) north of Kauai, Hawaii, by gunfire from attack helicopters and a torpedo launched by the Royal Canadian Navy submarine HMCS Corner Brook.	
USS Moody	United States Navy	21 February 1933	A decommissioned Clemson-class destroyer sunk with demolition charges off San Pedro, California, for filming of the move Hell Below.	
Nagato	Imperial Japanese Navy	29 July 1946	A Nagato-class battleship which capsized and sank at Bikini Atoll during the night of 29–30 July 1946 due to damage sustained on 25 July 1946 as a target during the Operation Crossroads atomic bomb tests.	
Naka	Imperial Japanese Navy	18 February 1944	A Sendai-class cruiser that was sunk by US aircraft 35 nautical miles (65 km; 40 mi) west of Chuuk.	07°15′N 151°15′E
USS Neches	United States Navy	23 January 1942	A replenishment oiler that was torpedoed by the Japanese submarine I-72 about 120 nautical miles (220 km; 140 mi) west of Pearl Harbor.	21°01′N 160°06′W
USS Nicholas	United States Navy	8 September 1923	A Clemson-class destroyer wrecked on Honda Point on the coast of Santa Barbara County, California, in the Honda Point disaster.	
USS O'Brien	United States Navy	9 February 2006	A Spruance-class destroyer sunk as a target off the Pacific Missile Range Facility near Kauai, Hawaii.	
USS Oklahoma	United States Navy	7 December 1941	A Nevada-class battleship sunk at Pearl Harbor, Hawaii, by Imperial Japanese Navy aircraft during the attack on Pearl Harbor. (See also 17 May 1947.)	
USS Oklahoma	United States Navy	17 May 1947	The hulk of a Nevada-class battleship which sank while under tow 500 nautical miles (930 km; 580 mi) northeast of Hawaii. (See also 7 December 1941.)	24°58′N 150°06′W
USS Oldendorf	United States Navy	22 August 2005	A Spruance-class destroyer sunk as a target off Washington.	
Patrol Boat No. 32	Imperial Japanese Navy	23 December 1941	A patrol vessel, formerly the Momi-class destroyer Aoi, deliberately beached on Wake Island during the Battle of Wake Island to discharge Special Naval Landing Force personnel, then destroyed by United States Marine Corps coastal artillery.	19°17′N 166°37′E
Patrol Boat No. 33	Imperial Japanese Navy	23 December 1941	A patrol vessel, formerly the Momi-class destroyer Hagi, deliberately beached on Wake Island during the Battle of Wake Island to discharge Special Naval Landing Force personnel, then destroyed by United States Marine Corps coastal artillery.	19°17′N 166°37′E
USS Peleliu	United States Navy	17 July 2026	A decommissioned Tarawa-class amphibious assault ship sunk as a target north of Kauai, Hawaii, by a Harpoon missile fired by the Spanish Navy guided-missile frigate Álvaro de Bazán	
USS Pickerel	United States Navy	22 March 1943	A Porpoise-class submarine missing after departing Midway Atoll. Probably sunk by Japanese forces northeast of Honshu in early April 1943.	
USS Pilotfish	United States Navy	25 July 1946	A Balao-class submarine sunk as a target at Bikini Atoll during the Operation Crossroads atomic bomb tests.	30°26′N 140°53′E
USS Pompano	United States Navy	20 August 1943	A Porpoise-class submarine missing after departing Midway Atoll. Probably sunk off Hokkaido or northeast Honshu sometime after 25 September 1943, perhaps by a mine.	
Princess Sophia	Canada	25 October 1918	A passenger liner that sank in a gale after running aground on Vanderbilt Reef in Lynn Canal near Juneau, Territory of Alaska.	58.6022°N 135.0236°W
Prinz Eugen	Kriegsmarine	22 December 1946	An Admiral Hipper-class heavy cruiser which sank at Kwajalein Atoll due to damage sustained on 25 July 1946 at Bikini Atoll in the Operation Crossroads atomic bomb tests.	08°45′09.85″N 167°40′59.16″E
Prusa	United States	18 December 1941	A cargo ship that was torpedoed by the Japanese submarine I-72 south of Hawaii.	
USS Queenfish	United States Navy	14 August 1963	A Balao-class submarine sunk as a target by the U.S. Navy submarine USS Swordfish.	
USS R-6	United States Navy	21 September 1921	An R-class submarine that sank accidentally in the harbor at San Pedro, California.	
USS Racine	United States Navy	12 July 2018	A decommissioned Newport-class tank landing ship sunk as a target 55 nmi (102 km; 63 mi) north of Kauai, Hawaii, by a Harpoon missile fired from a Royal Australian Air Force P-8A Poseidon and a torpedo fired by the U.S. Navy submarine USS Olympia.	
Ro-36	Imperial Japanese Navy	13 June 1944	A Kaichu 7-type submarine sunk by the United States Navy destroyer USS Melvin 75 nautical miles (139 km; 86 mi) east of Saipan.	15°21′N 147°00′E
Ro-38	Imperial Japanese Navy	19 November 1943	A Kaichu 7-type submarine missing in the vicinity of Butaritari and Tarawa in the Gilbert Islands.	
Ro-39	Imperial Japanese Navy	1 February 1944	A Kaichu 7-type submarine sunk by the United States Navy destroyer USS Walker near the Marshall Islands.	09°24′N 170°32′E
Ro-40	Imperial Japanese Navy	16 February 1944	A Kaichu 7-type submarine sunk by the United States Navy destroyers USS MacDonough and USS Phelps and minesweeper USS Sage east of the Gilbert Islands.	09°50′N 166°35′E
Ro-42	Imperial Japanese Navy	10 June 1944	A Kaichu 7-type submarine sunk by the United States Navy destroyer escort USS Bangust 40 nautical miles (74 km; 46 mi) east of Roi-Namur.	10°05′N 168°22′E
Ro-43	Imperial Japanese Navy	26 February 1945	A Kaichu 7-type submarine sunk by a United States Navy aircraft east of the Volcano Islands.	24°07′N 140°19′E
Ro-44	Imperial Japanese Navy	16 June 1944	A Kaichu 7-type submarine sunk by the United States Navy destroyer escort USS Burden R. Hastings 120 nautical miles (220 km; 140 mi) east of Eniwetok.	11°13′N 164°15′E
Ro-45	Imperial Japanese Navy	30 April 1944	A Kaichu 7-type submarine sunk by the United States Navy destroyers USS MacDonough and USS Stephen Potter 40 nautical miles (74 km; 46 mi) south of Truk.	06°13′N 151°19′E
Ro-48	Imperial Japanese Navy	19 July 1944	A Kaichu 7-type submarine sunk by the United States Navy destroyer escort USS Wyman 300 nautical miles (560 km; 350 mi) east of Saipan.	13°01′N 151°58′E
Ro-60	Imperial Japanese Navy	29 December 1941	A Type L4 submarine wrecked on a reef north of Kwajalein Atoll.	09°00′N 167°30′E
Ro-65	Imperial Japanese Navy	3 November 1942	A Type L4 submarine that sank in a diving accident in the harbor at Kiska in the Aleutian Islands.	51°58′N 177°33′E
Ro-66	Imperial Japanese Navy	17 December 1941	A Type L4 submarine that sank in a collision with the Japanese submarine Ro-62 25 nautical miles (46 km; 29 mi) southwest of Wake Island.	19°10′N 166°28′E
Ro-104	Imperial Japanese Navy	23 May 1944	A Ro-100-class submarine sunk by the United States Navy destroyer escort USS England north of the Admiralty Islands.	01°26′N 149°20′E
Ro-105	Imperial Japanese Navy	31 May 1944	A Ro-100-class submarine sunk by the United States Navy destroyer escort USS England north of the Admiralty Islands.	00°47′N 149°56′E
Ro-106	Imperial Japanese Navy	22 May 1944	A Ro-100-class submarine sunk by the United States Navy destroyer escort USS England north of the Admiralty Islands.	01°40′N 150°31′E
Ro-107	Imperial Japanese Navy	6 July 1943	A Ro-100-class submarine missing east of Rendova in the Solomon Islands.	
Ro-111	Imperial Japanese Navy	10 June 1944	A Ro-100-class submarine sunk by the United States Navy destroyer USS Taylor north of the Admiralty Islands.	00°26′N 149°16′E
Ro-116	Imperial Japanese Navy	24 May 1944	A Ro-100-class submarine sunk by the United States Navy destroyer escort USS England north of the Admiralty Islands.	00°53′N 149°14′E
Ro-117	Imperial Japanese Navy	17 June 1944	A Ro-100-class submarine sunk by a United States Navy aircraft 350 nautical miles (650 km; 400 mi) southeast of Saipan.	11°05′N 150°31′E
USS Rodney M. Davis	United States Navy	12 July 2022	A decommissioned Oliver Hazard Perry-class guided-missile frigate sunk as a target northwest of Kauai, Hawaii.	
USS Runner	United States Navy	22 June 1943	A Gato-class submarine missing off Hokkaido.	
Ryunan Maru	Imperial Japanese Army	20 October 1942	A troopship for the Imperial Japanese Army that was torpedoed by the American submarine USS Drum.	34°08′N 136°46′E
USS S-4	United States Navy	15 May 1936	An S-class submarine scuttled off Pearl Harbor, Hawaii.	
USS S-19	United States Navy	18 December 1938	An S-class submarine scuttled off Pearl Harbor, Hawaii.	
USS S-26	United States Navy	24 January 1942	An S-class submarine that was accidentally rammed by USS Sturdy in the Gulf of Panama.	8°13′N 79°21′W
USS S-27	United States Navy	19 June 1942	An S-class submarine wrecked on rocks off St. Makarius Point on Amchitka in the Aleutian Islands.	51.3306°N 179.2034°E
USS S-28	United States Navy	4 July 1944	An S-class submarine that sank in a diving accident off Oahu, Hawaii.	21°20′N 158°23′W
USS S-37	United States Navy	20 February 1945	An S-class submarine that sank under tow off San Diego, California. Later refloated, but sank again off Imperial Beach, California.	32°36.2541′N 117°08.2334′W
USS S-44	United States Navy	7 October 1943	An S-class submarine sunk off the Kuril Islands by the Japanese escort ship Ishigaki.	
USS S. P. Lee	United States Navy	8 September 1923	A Clemson-class destroyer wrecked on Honda Point on the coast of Santa Barbara County, California, in the Honda Point disaster.	
Sado Maru	Japan	10 April 1942	A transport ship that was torpedoed by the American submarine USS Thresher.	34°59′N 139°29′E
Sakawa	Imperial Japanese Navy	2 July 1946	An Agano-class light cruiser that sank at Bikini Atoll after sustaining damage as a target in the Operation Crossroads atomic bomb tests.	11°37′N 165°29′E
San Clemente Maru	Imperial Japanese Navy	4 May 1943	A tanker that was torpedoed by the American submarine USS Seal.	06°50′N 134°28′E
USS Saratoga	United States Navy	25 July 1946	A Lexington-class aircraft carrier sunk as a target at Bikini Atoll during the Operation Crossroads atomic bomb tests.	11°34′53″N 165°29′55″E
Satsuma	Imperial Japanese Navy	7 September 1924	A Satsuma-class battleship sunk as a target in Tokyo Bay by the Japanese battleships Mutsu and Nagato off the southern tip of the Bōsō Peninsula near the mouth of Tokyo Bay.	
Sazanami Maru	Imperial Japanese Navy	29 August 1916	A decommissioned miscellaneous service vessel, formerly the Ikazuchi-class destroyer Sazanami, sunk as a target off Tateyama, Japan.	
USS Scamp	United States Navy	11 November 1944	A Gato-class submarine sunk south of Tokyo Bay by the Japanese Type D escort ship No. 4.	33°38′N 141°00′E
USS Sculpin	United States Navy	19 November 1943	A Sargo-class submarine scuttled off Truk while under attack by Japanese destroyers.	08°40′N 155°02′E
Shirakumo	Imperial Japanese Navy	16 March 1944	A Fubuki-class destroyer that was torpedoed by the American submarine USS Tautog 170 nautical miles (310 km; 200 mi) east of Muroran, Japan.	42°25′N 144°55′E
USS Skipjack	United States Navy	25 July 1946	A Salmon-class submarine sunk as a target at Bikini Atoll during the Operation Crossroads atomic bomb tests. Refloated 2 September 1946. (See also 11 March 1948.)	
USS Skipjack	United States Navy	11 August 1948	A Salmon-class submarine sunk as a target off California. (See also 25 July 1946.)	
Sōryū	Imperial Japanese Navy	4 June 1942	An aircraft carrier sunk by U.S. Navy aircraft in the Battle of Midway.	30°38′N 179°13′W
USS Sproston	United States Navy	20 July 1937	A Wickes-class destroyer sunk as a target off Hawaii.	
USS Stickleback	United States Navy	29 May 1958	A Balao-class submarine that sank off Hawaii after colliding with the destroyer escort USS Silverstein.	
Suzukaze	Imperial Japanese Navy	25 January 1944	A Shiratsuyu-class destroyer that was torpedoed by the American submarine USS Skipjack 127 nautical miles (235 km; 146 mi) northwest of Pohnpei.	08°51′N 157°10′E
USS Tarawa	United States Navy	19 July 2024	A decommissioned Tarawa-class amphibious assault ship sunk as a target north of Kauai, Hawaii, by a U.S. Navy F/A-18F Super Hornet aircraft.	
Tatsuta Maru	Japan	8 February 1943	An ocean liner converted into a troopship that was torpedoed by USS Tarpon 42 miles (68 km) east of Mikura-jima, Japan.	34°00′N 140°00′E
USS Thach	United States Navy	14 July 2016	A decommissioned Oliver Hazard Perry-class guided-missile frigate sunk as a target north of Kauai, Hawaii.	
Thor	Kriegsmarine	30 November 1942	A merchant raider destroyed by fire at Yokohama, Japan.	35°23′50″N 139°38′50″E
Tokiwa	Imperial Japanese Navy	9 August 1945	A minelayer beached in Mutsu Bay while under attack by United States Navy aircraft.	41.20°N 141.60°E
USS Towers	United States Navy	9 October 2002	A Charles F. Adams-class guided missile destroyer sunk as a target off California by the U.S. Navy guided-missile frigate USS Sides.	
Tsugaru	Imperial Japanese Navy	27 May 1924	A Pallada-class protected cruiser scuttled with explosive charges off Yokosuka, Japan.	
Two Brothers	United States	11 February 1823	A whaler that ran aground on a reef near the French Frigate Shoals.	
Uckermark	Kriegsmarine	30 November 1942	A tanker sunk by an accidental internal explosion at Yokohama, Japan.	35°23′50″N 139°38′50″E
USS Walker	United States Navy	28 December 1941	A Wickes-class destroyer that was scuttled northeast of Hawaii.	26°35′N 143°49′W
USS Woodbury	United States Navy	8 September 1923	A Clemson-class destroyer wrecked on Honda Point on the coast of Santa Barbara County, California, in the Honda Point disaster.	
Yamabiko Maru	Japan	13 January 1944	A repair ship that was torpedoed by the American submarine USS Steelhead about 200 nautical miles (370 km; 230 mi) south of Hamamatsu, Japan.	31°28′N 137°44′E
Yamakaze	Imperial Japanese Navy	25 June 1942	A Shiratsuyu-class destroyer that was torpedoed by the American submarine USS Nautilus 60 nautical miles (110 km; 69 mi) southeast of Yokosuka, Japan.	34°34′N 140°26′E
Yasukuni Maru	Japan	31 January 1944	A Terukuni Maru-class ocean liner that was torpedoed by the American submarine USS Trigger northwest of Chuuk.	09°15′N 147°13′E
YO-160	United States Navy	25 July 1946	A fuel oil barge sunk as a target at Bikini Atoll during the Operation Crossroads atomic bomb tests.	
USS Yorktown	United States Navy	7 June 1942	A Yorktown-class aircraft carrier that was sunk at the Battle of Midway. The wreck was discovered in 1998.	30°35′59″N 176°34′4″W
USS Young	United States Navy	8 September 1923	A Clemson-class destroyer wrecked on Honda Point on the coast of Santa Barbara County, California, in the Honda Point disaster.	
Yu 24	Imperial Japanese Army	1945	A Yu-1-class transport submarine which sank in an accident at Hitachi, Japan.	
Yu 1001	Imperial Japanese Army	12 August 1945	A Yu-1001-class transport submarine sunk by U.S. aircraft at Shimoda, Japan.	
Yu 3002	Imperial Japanese Army	1945	A Yu-3001-class transport submarine which sank in a storm in Japan.	

=== Bering Sea ===
Ship	Flag	Sunk date	Notes	Coordinates
USS Grunion	United States Navy	30 July 1942	A Gato-class submarine sunk on or after 30 July 1942 north of Kiska in the Aleutian Islands, probably by the circular run of one of her own torpedoes.	
I-9	Imperial Japanese Navy	13 June 1943	A Type A1 submarine sunk by the United States Navy destroyer USS Frazier northwest of Kiska in the Aleutian Islands.	52°08′N 177°03′E
I-24	Imperial Japanese Navy	11 June 1943	A Type C1 submarine that was sunk by the United States Navy patrol vessel USS Larchmont near Shemya in the Aleutian Islands.	53°16′N 174°24′E
I-31	Imperial Japanese Navy	13 May 1943	A Type B1 submarine sunk by the United States Navy destroyer USS Edwards five nautical miles (9.3 km; 5.8 mi) northeast of Chichagof Harbor on Attu in the Aleutian Islands.	
Ro-61	Imperial Japanese Navy	31 August 1942	A Type L4 submarine sunk north of Atka in the Aleutian Islands by the United States Navy destroyer USS Reid.	52°36′N 173°57′W

=== Bohol Sea ===
Ship	Flag	Sunk date	Notes	Coordinates
Mogami	Imperial Japanese Navy	25 October 1944	A Mogami-class heavy cruiser scuttled after sustaining damage in the Battle of Leyte Gulf.	09°40′N 124°50′E

=== Celebes Sea ===
Ship	Flag	Sunk date	Notes	Coordinates
USS Capelin	United States Navy	2 December 1943	A Balao-class submarine missing in the Celebes Sea-Molucca Sea area.	
Forafric	United Kingdom	24 December 1941	A cargo ship that was bombed by Japanese aircraft.	
Hayanami	Imperial Japanese Navy	7 June 1944	A Yūgumo-class destroyer that was torpedoed by the American submarine USS Harder.	04°43′N 120°03′E
HNLMS Prins van Oranje	Royal Netherlands Navy	12 January 1942	A Prins van Oranje-class minelayer sunk by the Japanese destroyer Yamakaze and patrol vessel Patrol Boat 38 off Tarakan.	
USS S-36	United States Navy	21 January 1942	An S-class submarine scuttled after running aground on Taka Bakang Reef at the southern end of Makassar Strait, approximately 60 nautical miles (110 km; 69 mi) west-northwest of Makassar, Celebae, Netherlands East Indies.	04°57′N 118°31′E
Sanae	Imperial Japanese Navy	18 November 1943	A Wakatake-class destroyer that sank after being torpedoed by the American submarine USS Bluefish.	04°52′N 122°07′E

=== East China Sea ===
Ship	Flag	Sunk date	Notes	Coordinates
Asashimo	Imperial Japanese Navy	7 April 1945	A Yūgumo-class destroyer that was sunk by US aircraft 150 nautical miles (280 km; 170 mi) southwest of Nagasaki, Japan.	31°N 128°E
USS Bates	United States Navy	25 May 1945	A Buckley-class destroyer escort that was sunk by kamikaze aircraft west of Okinawa, Japan.	26°41′N 127°47′E
HMS Bedford	Royal Navy	21 August 1910	A Monmouth-class armoured cruiser wrecked on Samarang Reef.	
USS Bush	United States Navy	6 April 1945	A Fletcher-class destroyer that was sunk by kamikaze aircraft off Okinawa, Japan.	27°16′N 127°48′E
USS Callaghan	United States Navy	28 July 1945	A Fletcher-class destroyer that was sunk by kamikaze aircraft off Okinawa, Japan.	25°43′N 126°55′E
Chanzy	French Navy	20 May 1907	An Amiral Charner-class armored cruiser wrecked on rocks off Ballard Island in the Chusan Islands off China.	
USS Colhoun	United States Navy	6 April 1945	A Fletcher-class destroyer that was sunk by kamikaze aircraft and the U.S. Navy destroyer USS Cassin Young off Okinawa, Japan.	27°16′N 127°48′E
USS Drexler	United States Navy	28 May 1945	An Allen M. Sumner-class destroyer that was sunk by kamikaze aircraft off Okinawa, Japan.	27°6′N 127°38′E
USS Emmons	United States Navy	6 April 1945	A Bristol-class destroyer that was scuttled off the north coast of Okinawa after being damaged beyond repair by kamikaze aircraft.	26°48′N 128°04′E
Gravina	Spanish Navy	10 July 1884	A Velasco-class cruiser that was wrecked on Fuga Island in the Babuyan Islands north of Luzon in the Spanish East Indies during a typhoon.	
Ha-103	Imperial Japanese Navy	1 April 1946	A Sen'yu-Shō-type submarine scuttled by United States Navy forces off the Gotō Islands in Operation Road's End.	32°30′N 128°40′E
Ha-105	Imperial Japanese Navy	1 April 1946	A Sen'yu-Shō-type submarine scuttled by United States Navy forces off the Gotō Islands in Operation Road's End.	32°37′N 129°17′E
Ha-106	Imperial Japanese Navy	1 April 1946	A Sen'yu-Shō-type submarine scuttled by United States Navy forces off the Gotō Islands in Operation Road's End.	32°37′N 129°17′E
Ha-107	Imperial Japanese Navy	1 April 1946	A Sen'yu-Shō-type submarine scuttled by United States Navy forces off the Gotō Islands in Operation Road's End.	32°37′N 129°17′E
Ha-108	Imperial Japanese Navy	1 April 1946	A Sen'yu-Shō-type submarine scuttled by United States Navy forces off the Gotō Islands in Operation Road's End.	32°37′N 129°17′E
Ha-109	Imperial Japanese Navy	1 April 1946	A Sen'yu-Shō-type submarine scuttled by United States Navy forces off the Gotō Islands in Operation Road's End.	32°37′N 129°17′E
Ha-111	Imperial Japanese Navy	1 April 1946	A Sen'yu-Shō-type submarine scuttled by United States Navy forces off the Gotō Islands in Operation Road's End.	32°37′N 129°17′E
Ha-207	Imperial Japanese Navy	5 April 1946	A Sentaka-Shō-type submarine scuttled by United States Navy forces off Sasebo Bay, Japan.	
Ha-210	Imperial Japanese Navy	5 April 1946	A Sentaka-Shō-type submarine scuttled by United States Navy forces off Sasebo Bay, Japan.	
Ha-216	Imperial Japanese Navy	5 April 1946	A Sentaka-Shō-type submarine scuttled by United States Navy forces off Sasebo Bay, Japan.	
Hamakaze	Imperial Japanese Navy	7 April 1945	A Kagerō-class destroyer that was sunk by US aircraft 150 nautical miles (280 km; 170 mi) southwest of Nagasaki, Japan.	30°47′N 128°08′E
Hanazuki	Imperial Japanese Navy	3 February 1948	An Akizuki-class destroyer that was sunk as a target off the Gotō Islands.	35°30′N 122°49′E
I-36	Imperial Japanese Navy	1 April 1946	A Type B1 submarine scuttled with demolition charges by United States Navy forces off the Gotō Islands in Operation Road's End.	32°37′N 129°17′E
I-47	Imperial Japanese Navy	1 April 1946	A Type C2 submarine scuttled with demolition charges by United States Navy forces off the Gotō Islands in Operation Road's End.	
I-53	Imperial Japanese Navy	1 April 1946	A Type C3 submarine scuttled by gunfire by the United States Navy submarine tender USS Nereus off the Gotō Islands in Operation Road's End.	32°37′N 129°17′E
I-61	Imperial Japanese Navy	2 October 1941	A Kaidai 4-type submarine sunk in a collision with the Japanese gunboat Kiso Maru in Koshiki Channel.	
I-156	Imperial Japanese Navy	1 April 1946	A Kaidai 3B-type submarine scuttled with demolition charges by United States Navy forces off the Gotō Islands in Operation Road's End.	32°37′N 129°17′E
I-157	Imperial Japanese Navy	1 April 1946	A Kaidai 3B-type submarine scuttled with demolition charges by United States Navy forces off the Gotō Islands in Operation Road's End.	32°37′N 129°17′E
I-158	Imperial Japanese Navy	1 April 1946	A Kaidai 3B-type submarine scuttled with demolition charges by United States Navy forces off the Gotō Islands in Operation Road's End.	32°37′N 129°17′E
I-159	Imperial Japanese Navy	1 April 1946	A Kaidai 3B-type submarine scuttled with demolition charges by United States Navy forces off the Gotō Islands in Operation Road's End.	
I-162	Imperial Japanese Navy	1 April 1946	A Kaidai 3B-type submarine scuttled by gunfire by the United States Navy submarine tender USS Nereus off the Gotō Islands in Operation Road's End.	32°37′N 129°17′E
I-202	Imperial Japanese Navy	5 April 1946	A Sentaka-type submarine scuttled by gunfire by United States Navy forces off the Gotō Islands.	
I-366	Imperial Japanese Navy	1 April 1946	A Type D1 submarine scuttled by United States Navy forces off the Gotō Islands in Operation Road's End.	
I-367	Imperial Japanese Navy	1 April 1946	A Type D1 submarine scuttled by United States Navy forces off the Gotō Islands in Operation Road's End.	
I-373	Imperial Japanese Navy	14 August 1945	A Type D2 submarine sunk by the United States Navy submarine USS Spikefish southeast of Shanghai, China.	29°02′N 123°53′E
I-402	Imperial Japanese Navy	1 April 1946	A Sentoku-type submarine scuttled by gunfire by the United States Navy destroyers USS Everett F. Larson and USS Goodrich off the Gotō Islands in Operation Road's End.	32°37′N 129°17′E
Isokaze	Imperial Japanese Navy	7 April 1945	A Kagerō-class destroyer that was sunk by US aircraft 150 miles (240 km) southwest of Nagasaki, Japan.	30.46°N 128.92°E
Kashino	Imperial Japanese Navy	4 September 1942	A munition ship that was torpedoed by the U.S. Navy submarine USS Growler northeast of Taipei, Formosa.	25°45′N 122°42′E
Kasumi	Imperial Japanese Navy	7 April 1945	An Asashio-class destroyer that was attacked by US aircraft and scuttled 150 nautical miles (280 km; 170 mi) southwest of Nagasaki, Japan.	
Kongō	Imperial Japanese Navy	21 November 1944	A Kongō-class battleship which sank in the Formosa Strait 55 nautical miles (102 km; 63 mi) northwest of Keelung, Formosa, after she was torpedoed by the United States Navy submarine USS Sealion.	
USS Little	United States Navy	3 May 1945	A Fletcher-class destroyer sunk by kamikaze aircraft off Okinawa, Japan.	26.4°N 126.25°E
USS Mannert L. Abele	United States Navy	12 April 1945	An Allen M. Sumner-class destroyer that was sunk by kamikaze aircraft off Okinawa, Japan.	27°15′0″N 126°30′0″E
Miyuki	Imperial Japanese Navy	29 June 1934	A Fubuki-class destroyer that collided with Inazuma in the Korea Strait.	33°00′N 125°30′E
USS Morrison	United States Navy	4 May 1945	A Fletcher-class destroyer that was sunk by kamikaze aircraft off Okinawa, Japan.	27°10′N 127°58′E
Nagara	Imperial Japanese Navy	7 August 1944	A Nagara-class light cruiser torpedoed by the United States Navy submarine USS Croaker off the Amakusa Islands.	32°09′N 129°53′E
HMS Providence	Royal Navy	16 May 1797	A sloop-of-war wrecked on a coral reef at the northwestern tip of the reef group Yabiji in the Miyako Islands.	
Ro-31	Imperial Japanese Navy	5 April 1946	A Kaichu 5-type submarine scuttled by United States Navy forces off Sasebo Bay, Japan.	
Ro-50	Imperial Japanese Navy	1 April 1946	A Kaichu 7-type submarine scuttled by United States Navy forces 16 nautical miles (30 km; 18 mi) off Kinai Island in the Gotō Islands in Operation Road's End.	
Ro-56	Imperial Japanese Navy	9 April 1945	A Kaichu 7-type submarine sunk by the United States Navy destroyers USS Mertz and USS Monssen 45 nautical miles (83 km; 52 mi) west of Okinawa.	26°09′N 130°21′E
Seisho Maru	Japan	18 November 1944	A cargo ship that was sunk by the U.S. Navy submarine USS Sunfish.	33°36′N 124°18′E
HMS Sparrowhawk	Royal Navy	17 June 1904	A Quail-class destroyer which sank after striking an uncharted rock off the mouth of the Yangtze.	
Tone	Imperial Japanese Navy	30 April 1933	A protected cruiser sunk as a target off Amami Ōshima.	
Unryū	Imperial Japanese Navy	19 December 1944	A Unryū-class aircraft carrier that was torpedoed by the U.S. Navy submarine USS Redfish.	29°59′N 124°03′E
Urakaze	Imperial Japanese Navy	21 November 1944	A Kagerō-class destroyer torpedoed by the United States Navy submarine USS Sealion in the Formosa Strait 65 nautical miles (120 km; 75 mi) northwest of Keelung, Formosa.	26°09′N 121°23′E
Yahagi	Imperial Japanese Navy	7 April 1945	An Agano-class cruiser that was sunk by US aircraft south of Kyushu, Japan.	30°47′N 128°08′E
Yamato	Imperial Japanese Navy	7 April 1945	A Yamato-class battleship that was sunk by US aircraft north of Okinawa, Japan.	30°22′N 128°04′E
Yu 10	Imperial Japanese Navy	1945	A Yu-1-class transport submarine which sank in a storm at Kuchinotsu, Japan.	
Yu 12	Imperial Japanese Navy	1945	A Yu-1-class transport submarine which sank in a storm at Kuchinotsu, Japan.	

=== Gulf of Alaska ===
Ship	Flag	Sunk date	Notes	Coordinates
I-180	Imperial Japanese Navy	26 April 1944	A Kaidai 7-type submarine sunk by the United States Navy destroyer escort USS Gilmore southwest of Chirikof Island.	55°9′57″N 155°40′0″W
Prinsendam	Netherlands	11 October 1980	A cruise ship that sank off Southeast Alaska.	55.883°N 136.450°W
Ryou-Un Maru	Japan	5 April 2012	A fishing boat that was swept out to sea by the March 2011 tsunami, and drifted across the Pacific. She was discovered a year later in Canadian waters, and scuttled by the United States Coast Guard cutter USCGC Anacapa 180 nautical miles (330 km; 210 mi) off Southeast Alaska.	

=== Philippine Sea ===
Ship	Flag	Sunk date	Notes	Coordinates
Akashi	Imperial Japanese Navy	3 August 1930	A Suma-class protected cruiser sunk as a target by Imperial Japanese Navy dive bomber aircraft south of Izu Ōshima.	
Akizuki	Imperial Japanese Navy	25 October 1944	An Akizuki-class destroyer that was sunk by US forces northeast of Cape Engaño.	20°29′N 126°30′E
Asanagi	Imperial Japanese Navy	22 May 1944	A Kamikaze-class destroyer that was torpedoed by USS Pollack 200 miles (320 km) northwest of Chichijima, Japan.	28°20′N 138°57′E
USS Bismarck Sea	United States Navy	21 February 1945	A Casablanca-class escort carrier that was sunk by kamikaze aircraft.	24°2′21″N 141°18′49″E
Chikuma	Imperial Japanese Navy	25 October 1944	A Tone-class cruiser that was sunk in the Battle off Samar.	11°25′N 126°36′E
Chitose	Imperial Japanese Navy	19 July 1931	A Kasagi-class protected cruiser sunk as a target by Japanese dive bomber aircraft off Kōchi, Japan.	
Chitose	Imperial Japanese Navy	25 October 1944	A Chitose-class aircraft carrier that was sunk by US aircraft in the Battle of Leyte Gulf.	19°20′N 126°20′E
Chiyoda	Imperial Japanese Navy	5 August 1927	A protected cruiser sunk as a target in the Bungo Channel by the Japanese heavy cruiser Furutaka.	
Chiyoda	Imperial Japanese Navy	25 October 1944	A Chitose-class aircraft carrier sunk in the Battle of Leyte Gulf.	18°37′0″N 126°45′0″E
Chōkai	Imperial Japanese Navy	25 October 1944	A Takao-class cruiser that was scuttled during the Battle off Samar.	11°22′N 126°22′E
Derbyshire	United Kingdom	10 September 1980	A 169,000-gross ton bulk carrier, the largest British ship ever to have been lost at sea. She sank 230 nautical miles (430 km; 260 mi) off Okinawa, Japan, claiming the lives of all 44 on board. Kowloon Bridge was a sister ship.	25°30′N 130°30′E
USS Eversole	United States Navy	28 October 1944	A John C. Butler-class destroyer escort torpedoed and sunk during the Battle of Leyte Gulf by the Japanese submarine I-45.	10°18′N 127°37′E
USS Extractor	United States Navy	24 January 1945	An Anchor-class rescue and salvage ship that was torpedoed mistakenly by the United States Navy submarine USS Guardfish in the Philippine Sea.	15°44′N 135°29′E
Fusō	Imperial Japanese Navy	25 October 1944	A Fusō-class battleship torpedoed by the United States Navy destroyer USS Melvin in Surigao Strait during the Battle of Surigao Strait.	
USS Grayback	United States Navy	27 February 1944	A Tambor-class submarine that was sunk by Japanese aircraft south of Okinawa, Japan.	25°47′N 128°45′E
Hatsuzuki	Imperial Japanese Navy	25 October 1944	An Akizuki-class destroyer that was sunk by US ships northeast of Cape Engaño, Philippines.	20°24′N 126°20′E
Hizen	Imperial Japanese Navy	25 July 1924	A coastal defence ship sunk as a target in the Bungo Channel.	
Hiyō	Imperial Japanese Navy	20 June 1944	A Hiyō-class aircraft carrier that was sunk in the Battle of the Philippine Sea.	16°20′N 132°32′E
USS Hoel	United States Navy	25 October 1944	A Fletcher-class destroyer that was sunk in the Battle off Samar.	11°46′N 126°33′E
I-8	Imperial Japanese Navy	31 March 1945	A Type J3 submarine sunk by the United States Navy destroyer USS Stockton (DD-646) off the Kerama Islands.	25°29′N 128°35′E
I-26	Imperial Japanese Navy	26 October 1944	A Type B1 submarine probably sunk off Leyte in the Philippine Islands by the United States Navy destroyer escorts USS Coolbaugh and USS Richard M. Rowell.	09°45′N 126°45′E
I-37	Imperial Japanese Navy	19 November 1944	A Type B1 submarine sunk off Kossol Roads in the Palau Islands by the United States Navy destroyer escort USS McCoy Reynolds.	08°07′N 134°16′E
I-38	Imperial Japanese Navy	13 November 1944	A Type B1 submarine sunk east of the Palau Islands by the United States Navy destroyer USS Nicholas.	08°04′N 138°03′E
I-41	Imperial Japanese Navy	18 November 1944	A Type B2 submarine sunk east of Samar in the Philippine Islands by United States Navy aircraft and the destroyer escorts USS Lawrence C. Taylor and USS Melvin R. Nawman.	12°44′N 130°42′E
I-42	Imperial Japanese Navy	23 March 1944	A Type B2 submarine sunk 6 nautical miles (11 km; 6.9 mi) southwest of Angaur in the Palau Islands by the United States Navy submarine USS Tunny.	06°40′N 134°03′E
I-44	Imperial Japanese Navy	29 April 1945	A Type B2 submarine missing after 4 April 1945. Probably sunk by a United States Navy aircraft 6 nautical miles (11 km; 6.9 mi) southeast of Okinawa on 29 April.	24°15′N 131°16′E
I-45	Imperial Japanese Navy	29 October 1944	A Type B2 submarine sunk about 85 nautical miles (157 km; 98 mi) northeast of Siargao in the Philippine Islands by the United States Navy destroyer escort USS Whitehurst.	10°10′N 127°28′E
I-46	Imperial Japanese Navy	26 October 1944	A Type C2 submarine that went missing east of Leyte, Philippines.	
I-48	Imperial Japanese Navy	23 January 1945	A Type C2 submarine sunk 15 nautical miles (28 km; 17 mi) northeast of Yap in the Palau Islands by the United States Navy destroyer escort USS Conklin.	09°55′00″N 138°17′30″E or 09°45′N 138°20′E
I-54	Imperial Japanese Navy	23 October 1944	A Type B3 submarine that went missing east of the Philippine Islands.	
I-55	Imperial Japanese Navy	13 July 1944	A Type C3 submarine that went missing near Tinian in the Mariana Islands.	
I-56	Imperial Japanese Navy	31 March 1945	A Type B3 submarine that went missing after departing Otsujima, Japan.	
I-64	Imperial Japanese Navy	20 May 1942	A Kaidai 4-type submarine torpedoed by the United States Navy submarine USS Triton 250 nautical miles (460 km; 290 mi) south-southeast of Cape Ashizuri, Shikoku, Japan.	29°25′N 134°09′E
I-177	Imperial Japanese Navy	3 October 1944	A Kaidai 7-type submarine sunk by the United States Navy destroyer escort USS Samuel S. Miles.	07°48′N 133°28′E
I-183	Imperial Japanese Navy	29 April 1944	A Kaidai 7-type submarine sunk 30 nautical miles (56 km; 35 mi) south of Cape Ashizuri, Japan, by the United States Navy submarine USS Pogy.	32°07′N 133°03′E
I-184	Imperial Japanese Navy	19 June 1944	A Kaidai 7-type submarine sunk 20 nautical miles (37 km; 23 mi) southeast of Saipan by a United States Navy aircraft.	13°01′N 149°53′E
I-185	Imperial Japanese Navy	22 June 1944	A Kaidai 7-type submarine sunk near Saipan by the United States Navy fast minesweeper USS Chandler.	15°50′N 145°08′E
I-361	Imperial Japanese Navy	31 May 1945	A Type D1 submarine sunk by United States Navy aircraft 400 nautical miles (740 km; 460 mi) southeast of Okinawa.	20°22′N 134°09′E
I-363	Imperial Japanese Navy	29 October 1945	A Type D1 submarine sunk by a mine off Miyazaki Prefecture, Japan.	
I-368	Imperial Japanese Navy	26 February 1945	A Type D1 submarine sunk by United States Navy aircraft 35 nautical miles (65 km; 40 mi) west of Iwo Jima.	24°43′N 140°37′E
I-370	Imperial Japanese Navy	26 February 1945	A Type D1 submarine sunk by the United States Navy destroyer escort USS Finnegan near Iwo Jima.	22°44′N 141°26′E
Ioshima	Imperial Japanese Navy	19 September 1944	A kaibōkan sunk by the United States Navy submarine USS Shad south of Cape Omaezaki, Japan, about 85 nautical miles (157 km; 98 mi) from Hachijojima.	33°40′N 138°20′E
USS Johnston	United States Navy	25 October 1944	A Fletcher-class destroyer that was sunk in the Battle off Samar.	11°46′N 126°9′E
Mishima	Imperial Japanese Navy	5 May 1936	A submarine tender, formerly an Admiral Ushakov-class coastal defense ship, sunk as a target by Imperial Japanese Navy aircraft off Cape Toi, Japan.	31.364556°N 131.347389°E
USS Mississinewa	United States Navy	20 November 1944	A Cimarron-class replenishment oiler that was sunk by a Kaiten, a type of Japanese suicide craft.	9°58′44.22″N 139°39′45.43″E
Murakumo	Imperial Japanese Navy	4 June 1925	A Murakumo-class destroyer sunk as a target off the Sunosaki Lighthouse in Chiba Prefecture, Japan.	
Natori	Imperial Japanese Navy	18 August 1944	A Nagara-class cruiser that was torpedoed by the American submarine USS Hardhead east of the San Bernardino Strait.	12°29′N 128°49′E
No. 2525	Imperial Japanese Navy	29 April 1925	A retired cargo ship, formerly the Murakumo-class destroyer Usugumo, sunk as a target off Izu Ōshima in the Izu Islands.	
Nowaki	Imperial Japanese Navy	26 October 1944	A Kagero-class destroyer that was sunk by the American destroyer USS Owen southeast of Legazpi in the Philippines.	13°0′N 124°54′E
Otowa	Imperial Japanese Navy	10 August 1917	A protected cruiser that sank after running aground off Daiozaki, Japan.	34°14′N 136°53′E
Patrol Boat No. 31	Imperial Japanese Navy	31 March 1944	A patrol vessel, formerly the Momi-class destroyer Kiku, sunk by United States Navy aircraft near Palau in the Caroline Islands.	07°30′N 134°30′E
Patrol Boat No. 39	Imperial Japanese Navy	23 April 1943	A patrol vessel, formerly the Momi-class destroyer Tade, sunk by the United States Navy submarine USS Seawolf south of Yonaguni.	23.45°N 122.45°E
USS Princeton	United States Navy	24 October 1944	An Independence-class aircraft carrier that was sunk in the Battle of Leyte Gulf.	15°21′N 123°31′E
Ravnaas	Norway	8 December 1941	A cargo ship that was sunk by Japanese aircraft 250 nautical miles (460 km; 290 mi) east of Samar Island.	
Ro-41	Imperial Japanese Navy	23 March 1945	A Kaichū 7-type submarine sunk by the United States Navy destroyer USS Haggard 320 nautical miles (590 km; 370 mi) east of Okinawa.	22°57′N 132°19′E
Ro-46	Imperial Japanese Navy	17 April 1945	A Kaichu 7-type submarine missing northeast of Kitadaitōjima in the Ryukyu Islands.	
Ro-47	Imperial Japanese Navy	26 September 1944	A Kaichu 7-type submarine sunk by the United States Navy destroyer escort USS McCoy Reynolds northeast of the Palau Islands.	09°19′N 136°44′E
Ro-49	Imperial Japanese Navy	25 March 1945	A Kaichu 7-type submarine that went missing southeast of the Ryukyu Islands.	
Ro-109	Imperial Japanese Navy	25 April 1945	A Ro-100-class submarine sunk by the United States Navy fast transport USS Horace A. Bass 165 nautical miles (306 km; 190 mi) south-southwest of Okidaitōjima.	21°58′N 129°38′E
Ro-112	Imperial Japanese Navy	11 February 1945	A Ro-100-class submarine sunk by the United States Navy submarine USS Batfish in the Luzon Strait north of Luzon.	18°53′N 121°47′E
Ro-113	Imperial Japanese Navy	13 February 1945	A Ro-100-class submarine sunk by the United States Navy submarine USS Batfish in the Luzon Strait north of Luzon.	19°10′N 121°23′E
Ro-114	Imperial Japanese Navy	17 June 1944	A Ro-100-class submarine sunk by the United States Navy destroyers USS Melvin and USS Wadleigh 80 nautical miles (150 km; 92 mi) west of Tinian.	15°02′N 144°10′E
Sakito Maru	Japan	1 March 1944	A troopship that sank after the United States Navy submarine USS Trout torpedoed her on 29 February 1944.	
USS Samuel B. Roberts	United States Navy	25 October 1944	A John C. Butler-class destroyer escort that was sunk by the Japanese battleship Kongō in the Battle off Samar.	11°40′N 126°20′E
Sazanami	Imperial Japanese Navy	14 January 1944	A Fubuki-class destroyer that was torpedoed by the United States Navy submarine USS Albacore 300 nautical miles (560 km; 350 mi) southeast of Yap.	05°15′N 141°15′E
USS Seawolf	United States Navy	3 October 1944	A Sargo-class submarine sunk in error off Morotai by the U.S. Navy destroyer escort USS Richard M. Rowell.	02°32′N 129°18′E
Shinano	Imperial Japanese Navy	29 November 1944	A Yamato-class battleship, later converted into an aircraft carrier, that was torpedoed by the United States Navy submarine USS Archer-Fish 200 kilometres (120 mi) southeast of Shingū, Japan.	32°0′N 137°0′E
Shirakumo	Imperial Japanese Navy	21 July 1925	A Shirakumo-class destroyer sunk as a target in the Bungo Channel off Himeshima, Japan.	
Shiratsuyu	Imperial Japanese Navy	15 June 1944	A Shiratsuyu-class destroyer that collided with Seiyo Maru 90 nautical miles (170 km; 100 mi) southeast of Surigao Strait.	09°09′N 126°51′E
Shōkaku	Imperial Japanese Navy	19 June 1944	A Shōkaku-class aircraft carrier that was torpedoed by the American submarine USS Cavalla in the Battle of the Philippine Sea.	11°40′N 137°40′E
Suzuya	Imperial Japanese Navy	25 October 1944	A Mogami-class cruiser that was sunk by US aircraft in the Battle off Samar.	11°45.2′N 126°11.2′E
USS Swordfish	United States Navy	3 January 1945	A Sargo-class submarine that went missing east of the Ryukyu Islands.	
Taihō	Imperial Japanese Navy	19 June 1944	A Taihō-class aircraft carrier that was sunk by the American submarine USS Albacore in the Battle of the Philippine Sea.	12°05′N 138°12′E
Tama	Imperial Japanese Navy	25 October 1944	A Kuma-class cruiser that was torpedoed northeast of Luzon by the United States Navy submarine USS Jallao while retreating from the Battle of Leyte Gulf.	21°23′N 127°19′E
Tatsuta	Imperial Japanese Navy	13 March 1944	A Tenryū-class cruiser that was torpedoed by the American submarine USS Sand Lance 40 miles (64 km) northeast of Hachijō-jima, Japan.	32°52′N 139°12′E
Tokitsukaze	Imperial Japanese Navy	25 March 1918	An Isokaze-class destroyer that ran aground and broke in half near Aoshima Island in Miyazaki Prefecture, Kyūshū, Japan. Her equipment and weapons were salvaged and installed in a new hull, and she later reentered service.	
Tosa	Imperial Japanese Navy	9 February 1925	An incomplete Tosa-class battleship scuttled in the Bungo Channel south of the Mizunokojima Lighthouse and 16.1 kilometres (10.0 mi) west of Okinoshima Island.	
USS Trigger	United States Navy	28 March 1945	A Gato-class submarine sunk by Japanese warships off the east coast of Kyushu.	32°16′N 132°05′E
USS Trout	United States Navy	29 February 1944	A Tambor-class submarine sunk by the Japanese destroyer Asashimo.	22°40′N 131°45′E
USS Tullibee	United States Navy	26 March 1944	A Gato-class submarine that was sunk by her own torpedo off Palau.	9°30′N 134°45′E
USS Underhill	United States Navy	24 July 1945	A Buckley-class destroyer escort that was sunk by two Kaiten, a type of Japanese suicide craft.	19°20′0″N 126°42′0″E
Yamashiro	Imperial Japanese Navy	25 October 1944	A Fusō-class battleship sunk by U.S. Navy battleships and cruisers in Surigao Strait during the Battle of Surigao Strait.	
Yūbari	Imperial Japanese Navy	28 April 1944	A light cruiser that was sunk by the American submarine USS Bluegill southwest of Palau.	5.63333°N 131.75°E
Zuihō	Imperial Japanese Navy	25 October 1944	A Zuihō-class aircraft carrier that was sunk by US aircraft in the Battle off Cape Engaño.	19°20′N 125°15′E
Zuikaku	Imperial Japanese Navy	25 October 1944	A Shōkaku-class aircraft carrier that was sunk in the Battle of Leyte Gulf.	19°20′N 125°51′E

=== Sea of Japan ===
Ship	Flag	Sunk date	Notes	Coordinates
Admiral Nakhimov	Imperial Russian Navy	28 May 1905	An armored cruiser sunk by Imperial Japanese Navy warships in the Tsushima Strait during the Battle of Tsushima.	34°34′N 129°32′E
Admiral Ushakov	Imperial Russian Navy	28 May 1905	An Admiral Ushakov-class coastal defense ship scuttled after sustaining damage in combat with Imperial Japanese Navy warships in the Tsushima Strait during the Battle of Tsushima.	
Asatsuyu	Imperial Japanese Navy	9 November 1913	A Kamikaze-class destroyer that ran aground on a reef in Nanao Bay off Honshu, Japan. Her wreck broke up on 30 November 1913.	
USS Bonefish	United States Navy	18 June 1945	A Gato-class submarine sunk by Japanese warships in Toyama Bay off Honshu, Japan.	37°18′N 137°55′E
Borodino	Imperial Russian Navy	27 May 1905	A Borodino-class battleship sunk by Imperial Japanese Navy warships in the Tsushima Strait during the Battle of Tsushima.	
Buinyi	Imperial Russian Navy	28 May 1905	A Buinyi-class destroyer scuttled in the Tsushima Strait during the Battle of Tsushima.	
Dmitrii Donskoi	Imperial Russian Navy	29 May 1905	An armored cruiser scuttled 1.5 nautical miles (2.8 km; 1.7 mi) off Ulleungdo after sustaining damage in combat with Imperial Japanese Navy warships during the Battle of Tsushima.	37°30′N 130°57′E
I-121	Imperial Japanese Navy	30 April 1946	A Kiraisen-type submarine scuttled by United States Navy forces in Wakasa Bay off Kanmurijima, Japan.	
I-122	Imperial Japanese Navy	10 June 1945	A Kiraisen-type submarine torpedoed by the United States Navy submarine USS Skate in Nanao Bay 6 nautical miles (11 km; 6.9 mi) southeast of Rokugo Misaki lighthouse.	37°29′N 137°25′E
Imperator Aleksandr III	Imperial Russian Navy	27 May 1905	A Borodino-class battleship sunk by Imperial Japanese Navy warships in the Tsushima Strait during the Battle of Tsushima.	
Izumrud	Imperial Russian Navy	29 May 1905	A Izumrud-class protected cruiser wrecked in Vladimir Bay on the coast of Primorsky Krai, Russia.	43°54′N 135°30′E
Kasagi	Imperial Japanese Navy	10 August 1916	A Kasagi-class protected cruiser that sank after running aground in Tsugaru Strait.	
Knyaz Suvorov	Imperial Russian Navy	27 May 1905	A Borodino-class battleship sunk by Imperial Japanese Navy warships in the Tsushima Strait during the Battle of Tsushima.	
Kuri	Imperial Japanese Navy	8 October 1945	A Momi-class destroyer sunk by a mine off Pusan, Korea.	
Navarin	Imperial Russian Navy	28 May 1905	A battleship sunk by Imperial Japanese Navy warships in the Tsushima Strait during the Battle of Tsushima.	
Oslyabya	Imperial Russian Navy	27 May 1905	A battleship sunk by Imperial Japanese Navy warships in the Tsushima Strait during the Battle of Tsushima.	
Ro-68	Imperial Japanese Navy	30 April 1946	A Type L4 submarine scuttled by United States Navy forces in Wakasa Bay off Kanmurijima, Japan.	
Ro-500	Imperial Japanese Navy	30 April 1946	A Type IXC submarine scuttled by United States Navy forces in Wakasa Bay off Kanmurijima, Japan.	
Rurik	Imperial Russian Navy	14 August 1904	An armored cruiser scuttled in the Tsushima Strait off Ulsan, Korea, during the Battle off Ulsan after sustaining damage in combat with Imperial Japanese Navy warships.	
Sissoi Veliky	Imperial Russian Navy	28 May 1905	A battleship sunk by Imperial Japanese Navy warships in the Tsushima Strait during the Battle of Tsushima.	
Svetlana	Imperial Russian Navy	28 May 1905	A protected cruiser sunk by Imperial Japanese Navy warships southwest of Ulleungdo during the Battle of Tsushima.	37°06′N 129°50′E
Ural	Imperial Russian Navy	27 May 1905	An auxiliary cruiser sunk in combat with Imperial Japanese Navy warships in the Tsushima Strait during the Battle of Tsushima.	
Vladimir Monomakh	Imperial Russian Navy	28 May 1905	An armored cruiser scuttled near Tsushima Island after sustaining damage in combat with Imperial Japanese Navy warships during the Battle of Tsushima.	
Warabi	Imperial Japanese Navy	24 August 1927	A Momi-class destroyer sunk in a collision with the Japanese light cruiser Jintsū off Miho Bay, Honshu.	
Yayoi	Imperial Japanese Navy	10 August 1926	A Kamikaze-class destroyer sunk as a target by Japanese aircraft off the Oki Islands.	
Yu 11	Imperial Japanese Navy	1945	A Yu-1-class transport submarine which sank in a storm at Mikuriya, Japan, in 1945, sometime after mid-August.	
Yu 13	Imperial Japanese Navy	1945	A Yu-1-class transport submarine which sank in a storm at Mikuriya, Japan, in 1945, sometime after mid-August.	
Yu 14	Imperial Japanese Navy	1945	A Yu-1-class transport submarine which sank in a storm at Mikuriya, Japan, in 1945, sometime after mid-August.	
Yu 1007	Imperial Japanese Navy	1945 or 1946	A Yu-1001-class transport submarine which sank in a storm at Mikuriya, Japan, sometime between mid-August 1945 and the end of 1946.	

=== Sea of Okhotsk ===
Ship	Flag	Sunk date	Notes	Coordinates
Belorussiya	Soviet Union	3 March 1944	A cargo ship that was torpedoed by accident by U.S. Navy submarine USS Dace which mistook the vessel for a Japanese vessel.	
Dalniy Vostok	Russia	1 April 2015	A fishing trawler that foundered and sank south of Zavyalov Island, with at least 57 dead.	56.4833°N 150.4167°E
USS Herring	United States Navy	1 June 1944	A Gato-class submarine sunk by Japanese shore batteries off Matsuwa Island in the Kuril Islands.	48°0′N 153°0′E
Hakuyo Maru	Japan	10 June 1945	A cargo ship sunk by the U.S. Navy submarine USS Dace about 120 nautical miles (220 km; 140 mi) west of Shimushu Island.	47°21′N 149°07′E
Hokusei Maru	Japan	21 September 1943	A commercial fishing vessel sunk by the U.S. Navy submarine USS Wahoo west of the Kuril Islands.	45°34′N 145°46′E
Kasado Maru	Japan	10 August 1945	A cargo ship bombed by a Soviet aircraft off the mouth of the Kikhchik River on the Kamchatka Peninsula. Later caught fire.	
Naniwa	Imperial Japanese Navy	26 June 1912	A Naniwa-class protected cruiser that ran aground off Urup.	46°30′N 150°10′E
Niitaka	Imperial Japanese Navy	26 August 1922	A Niitaka-class protected cruiser wrecked on the southwestern coast of the Kamchatka Peninsula.	51°30′N 156°29′E
Novik	Imperial Russian Navy	20 August 1904	A protected cruiser scuttled at Korsakov on Sakhalin Island after suffering damage in combat with the Japanese protected cruiser Tsushima in the Battle of Korsakov.	
Usugumo	Imperial Japanese Navy	5 July 1944	A Fubuki-class destroyer that was torpedoed by USS Skate 330 nautical miles (610 km; 380 mi) southwest of Paramushiro in the Kuril islands.	47°43′N 147°55′E
USS Wahoo	United States Navy	11 October 1943	A Gato-class submarine that was sunk by Japanese aircraft in La Pérouse Strait.	
Zaosan Maru	Japan	19 June 1945	A merchant fishing vessel sank by the American submarine USS Cabezon near Paramushir Island.	50°39′N 154°38′E

=== Seto Inland Sea ===
Ship	Flag	Sunk date	Notes	Coordinates
I-33	Imperial Japanese Navy	13 June 1944	A Type B1 submarine that sank in a diving accident in the Iyo Nada.	
I-153	Imperial Japanese Navy	8 May 1946	A Kaidai 3A-type submarine scuttled by gunfire by the Royal Australian Navy destroyer HMAS Quiberon and the Royal Indian Navy sloop HMIS Sutlej.	
I-154	Imperial Japanese Navy	8 May 1946	A Kaidai 3A-type submarine scuttled by gunfire by the Royal Australian Navy destroyer HMAS Quiberon and the Royal Indian Navy sloop HMIS Sutlej.	
I-155	Imperial Japanese Navy	8 May 1946	A Kaidai 3A-type submarine scuttled by gunfire by the Royal Australian Navy destroyer HMAS Quiberon and the Royal Indian Navy sloop HMIS Sutlej.	
I-179	Imperial Japanese Navy	14 July 1943	A Kaidai 7-type submarine that sank in a diving accident.	32°29′N 131°54′W
Iwate	Imperial Japanese Navy	25 July 1945	A training ship that sank at Kure, Japan, due to damage inflicted by United States Navy aircraft the previous day during the July 1945 bombing of Kure.	34°14′N 132°30′E
Izumo	Imperial Japanese Navy	28 July 1945	A training ship sunk by United States Navy aircraft at Kure, Japan, during the July 1945 bombing of Kure.	34°14′N 132°30′E
Kawachi	Imperial Japanese Navy	12 July 1918	A Kawachi-class battleship sunk by an accidental magazine explosion in Tokuyama Bay.	34.00°N 131.60°E
Mutsu	Imperial Japanese Navy	8 June 1943	A Nagato-class battleship sunk by an accidental internal explosion at Hashirajima anchorage.	33°58′N 132°24′E
Nisshin	Imperial Japanese Navy	1936	A Giuseppe Garibaldi-class armored cruiser sunk as a target at the Kamegakubi Naval Proving Ground off Kure, Japan. Later refloated for re-use as a target ship.	
Nisshin	Imperial Japanese Navy	18 January 1942	A Giuseppe Garibaldi-class armored cruiser sunk as a target by the battleship Yamato off Kurahashi, Japan.	
Ōyodo	Imperial Japanese Navy	28 July 1945	A light cruiser sunk by United States Navy aircraft at Kure, Japan, during the July 1945 bombing of Kure.	34.232°N 132.554°E
Ro-62	Imperial Japanese Navy	May 1946	A Type L4 submarine scuttled by Allied forces in the Iyo Nada.	
Ro-63	Imperial Japanese Navy	May 1946	A Type L4 submarine scuttled by Allied forces in the Iyo Nada.	
Ro-64	Imperial Japanese Navy	12 April 1945	A Type L4 submarine sunk by a mine in Hiroshima Bay.	34°14′N 132°16′E

=== Sibuyan Sea ===
Ship	Flag	Sunk date	Notes	Coordinates
Musashi	Imperial Japanese Navy	24 October 1944	A Yamato-class battleship that was sunk by United States Navy aircraft in the Sibuyan Sea.	13°07′N 122°32′E

=== South China Sea ===
Ship	Flag	Sunk date	Notes	Coordinates
Akikaze	Imperial Japanese Navy	3 November 1944	A Minekaze-class destroyer that was sunk by USS Pintado 257 kilometres (160 mi) west of Bolinao, Philippines.	16°48′N 117°17′E
Antelope of Boston	United States	6 August 1858	A medium clipper that ran aground on a reef in the Paracel Islands.	17°N 112°E
Aotaka	Imperial Japanese Navy	26 September 1944	A Hatsutaka-class minelayer that was sunk by USS Pargo 90 kilometres (56 mi) west of Sabah, Borneo.	07°00′N 116°00′E
Asahi	Imperial Japanese Navy	25 May 1942	A repair ship torpedoed by the U.S. Navy submarine USS Salmon.	10°00′N 110°00′E
Asama Maru	Japan	1 November 1944	An ocean liner that was torpedoed by the American submarine USS Atule 100 miles (160 km) south of Pratas.	20.2833°N 117.633°E
Atago	Imperial Japanese Navy	23 October 1944	A Takao-class cruiser that was torpedoed by the United States Navy submarine USS Darter in the Palawan Passage during the Battle of Leyte Gulf.	09°28′N 117°17′E
USS Barbel	United States Navy	4 February 1945	A Balao-class submarine sunk by Japanese aircraft southwest of Palawan.	07°49′N 116°47′E
Castilla	Spanish Navy	1 May 1898	A Aragon-class unprotected cruiser sunk by United States Navy warships in Manila Bay during the Battle of Manila Bay.	
USS Darter	United States Navy	24 October 1944	A Gato-class submarine wrecked on a reef in the Palawan Passage during the Battle of Leyte Gulf.	09.456°N 116.933°E
Don Antonio de Ulloa	Spanish Navy	1 May 1898	A Velasco-class unprotected cruiser sunk by United States Navy warships in Manila Bay during the Battle of Manila Bay.	
Don Juan de Austria	Spanish Navy	1 May 1898	A Velasco-class unprotected cruiser sunk by United States Navy warships in Manila Bay during the Battle of Manila Bay.	
USS Grayling	United States Navy	9 September 1943	A Tambor-class submarine that went missing off Luzon in the Philippine Islands.	
USS Growler	United States Navy	8 November 1944	A Gato-class submarine sunk west of the Philippine Islands, probably by Japanese warships.	
USS Harder	United States Navy	24 August 1944	A Gato-class submarine sunk off Dasol Bay, Luzon, by Japanese warships.	15°50′N 119°43′E
Hashidate	Imperial Japanese Navy	22 May 1944	A Hashidate-class gunboat that was torpedoed by USS Picuda off Pratas Island.	21°08′N 117°20′E
Hội An wreck		1400s	A wreck that was discovered 22 nautical miles (41 km; 25 mi) off the coast of Vietnam, with a cargo of 15th-century Vietnamese ceramics.	
Hong Moh	(United Kingdom) Straits Settlement	3 March 1921	A passenger ship wrecked on the White Rocks, Lamock Island, Swatow, China.	23°14′N 117°17′E
Huaguangjiao One	Song dynasty		A ship that was built during the Southern Song dynasty, and sank near the Paracel Islands.	16°16′16″N 111°34′03″E
I-29	Imperial Japanese Navy	26 July 1944	A Type B1 submarine that was sunk by the United States Navy submarine USS Sawfish in the Luzon Strait.	20.10°N 121.55°E
I-30	Imperial Japanese Navy	13 October 1942	A Type B1 submarine sunk by a British mine 3 nautical miles (5.6 km; 3.5 mi) east of Keppel Harbour, Singapore.	
I-351	Imperial Japanese Navy	15 July 1945	A Senho-type submarine torpedoed by the United States Navy submarine USS Bluefish east-northeast of Natuna Besar.	04°30′N 110°00′E
Isla de Cuba	Spanish Navy	1 May 1898	A Isla de Luzón-class protected cruiser scuttled in Manila Bay after sustaining damage in combat with United States Navy warships during the Battle of Manila Bay.	
Isla de Luzón	Spanish Navy	1 May 1898	A Isla de Luzón-class protected cruiser scuttled in Manila Bay after sustaining damage in combat with United States Navy warships during the Battle of Manila Bay.	
HNLMS K XVI	Royal Netherlands Navy	25 December 1941	A K XIV-class submarine torpedoed by the Japanese submarine I-66.	02°30′N 109°50′E
HNLMS K XVII	Royal Netherlands Navy	21 December 1941	A K XIV-class submarine that struck a mine north of Tioman Island.	3°10′N 104°12′E
Kashii	Imperial Japanese Navy	12 January 1945	A Katori-class light cruiser sunk by U.S. Navy aircraft off French Indochina.	13°50′N 109°20′E
Kishinami	Imperial Japanese Navy	4 December 1944	A Yūgumo-class destroyer that was torpedoed by the U.S. Navy submarine USS Flasher west of Palawan Island in the Philippine Islands.	13°12′N 116°37′E
Kiso	Imperial Japanese Navy	13 November 1944	A Kuma-class light cruiser sunk by U.S. Navy aircraft in Manila Bay 13 kilometres (8.1 mi) west of Cavite, Luzon, in the Philippine Islands.	14°35′N 120°50′E
USS Lagarto	United States Navy	4 May 1945	A Balao-class submarine that was sunk by the Japanese minelayer Hatsutaka in the Gulf of Thailand.	7°55′N 102°00′E
Marques del Duero	Spanish Navy	1 May 1898	A Fernando el Catolico-class gunboat scuttled in Manila Bay after sustaining damage in combat with United States Navy warships during the Battle of Manila Bay.	
Matsushima	Imperial Japanese Navy	30 April 1908	A Matsushima-class protected cruiser sunk by the accidental explosion of her ammunition magazine at Mako in the Pescadores Islands.	23°32′N 119°34′E
Maya	Imperial Japanese Navy	23 October 1944	A Takao-class cruiser that was torpedoed by the American submarine USS Dace in the Battle of Leyte Gulf.	09°27′N 117°23′E
Montevideo Maru	Japan	1 July 1942	A prisoner-of-war transport ship that was torpedoed by the American submarine USS Sturgeon, killing over 800 Allied prisoners of war and 200 civilians.	18°37′N 119°29′E
Muggia	Regia Marina	25 March 1929	A Tátra-class destroyer that ran aground on the Finger Rocks near Hea Chu Island near Amoy, China, either in darkness and dense fog or during a typhoon.	
Nankai Maru	Imperial Japanese Navy	12 September 1944	A transport sunk by the United States Navy submarine USS Sealion east of Hainan Island.	18°42′N 114°30′E
Nokaze	Imperial Japanese Navy	26 September 1944	A Nokaze-class destroyer that was torpedoed by the American submarine USS Pargo.	12°27′N 109°40′E
HNLMS O 16	Royal Netherlands Navy	15 December 1941	A submarine that struck a mine near Tioman Island.	
HNLMS O 19	Royal Netherlands Navy	10 July 1945	An O 19-class submarine that ran aground on a reef and was scuttled.	8°40′N 111°40′E
HNLMS O 20	Royal Netherlands Navy	19 December 1941	An O 19-class submarine scuttled 35 nautical miles (65 km; 40 mi) northeast of Kota Baru, British Malaya, after sustaining damage in combat with Japanese warships.	
Ōi	Imperial Japanese Navy	19 July 1944	A Kuma-class light cruiser torpedoed by the United States Navy submarine USS Flasher 570 nautical miles (1,056 km; 656 mi) south of Hong Kong.	13°12′N 114°52′E
HMS Pelorus	Royal Navy	25 December 1844	A Cruizer-class brig-sloop that struck a shoal off the coast of Borneo.	8°8′30″N 115°30′00″E
Phénix	French Navy	15 June 1939	A Redoutable-class submarine that sank in a diving accident off French Indochina.	
HMS Prince of Wales	Royal Navy	10 December 1941	A King George V-class battleship that was sunk by Japanese bomber aircraft, along with HMS Repulse.	3°34′N 104°26′E
Reina Cristina	Spanish Navy	1 May 1898	An Alfonso XII-class unprotected cruiser sunk by United States Navy warships in Manila Bay during the Battle of Manila Bay.	
HMS Repulse	Royal Navy	10 December 1941	A Renown-class battlecruiser that was sunk by Japanese bomber aircraft, along with HMS Prince of Wales.	3°34′N 104°26′E
Ro-55	Imperial Japanese Navy	7 February 1945	A Kaichu 7-type submarine sunk by the United States Navy destroyer escort USS Thomason off Iba, Luzon.	15°27′N 119°25′E
Ro-115	Imperial Japanese Navy	1 February 1945	A Ro-100-class submarine sunk by the United States Navy destroyer escort USS Ulvert M. Moore 125 nautical miles (232 km; 144 mi) southwest of Manila.	13°20′N 119°20′E or 15°03′N 119°07′E
Sagiri	Imperial Japanese Navy	24 December 1941	A Fubuki-class destroyer that was torpedoed by the Dutch submarine HNLMS K XVI 35 nautical miles (65 km; 40 mi) off Kuching.	02°30′N 109°50′E
USNS Sgt. Jack J. Pendleton	United States Navy	23 September 1973	A cargo ship that ran aground at Triton Island.	
USS Sealion	United States Navy	25 December 1941	A Sargo-class submarine scuttled at Cavite, Luzon, Philippines.	14°29′24″N 120°54′46″E
USS Shark	United States Navy	24 October 1944	A Balao-class submarine sunk in Luzon Strait by the Japanese destroyer Harukaze.	20°41′N 119°27′E
Shigure	Imperial Japanese Navy	24 January 1945	A Shiratsuyu-class destroyer that was torpedoed by USS Blackfin 160 nautical miles (300 km; 180 mi) east of Kota Baru, British Malaya.	06°00′N 103°48′E
Shikinami	Imperial Japanese Navy	12 September 1944	A Fubuki-class destroyer that was torpedoed by USS Growler 240 nautical miles (440 km; 280 mi) south of Hong Kong.	18°16′N 114°40′E
Shimotsuki	Imperial Japanese Navy	25 November 1944	An Akizuki-class destroyer that was torpedoed by USS Cavalla 220 miles (350 km) northeast of Singapore.	2°21′N 107°20′E
Shinonome	Imperial Japanese Navy	20 July 1913	A Murakumo-class destroyer that was wrecked off the coast of Formosa northwest of Anping. The wreck broke up and sank on 23 July 1913.	
Shinonome	Imperial Japanese Navy	17 December 1941	A Fubuki-class destroyer bombed and sunk off Miri, Sarawak, by a Netherlands Naval Aviation Service Dornier Do 24 flying boat.	
Shirataka	Imperial Japanese Navy	31 August 1944	A minelayer that was torpedoed by USS Sealion in the Bashi Channel.	21°05′N 121°26′E
USS Snook	United States Navy	8 April 1945	A Gato-class submarine that went missing east of Formosa.	
Sully	French Navy	7 February 1905	A Gloire-class armored cruiser wrecked in Ha Long Bay on the coast of French Indochina.	
Tamanami	Imperial Japanese Navy	7 July 1944	A Yūgumo-class destroyer that was torpedoed by USS Mingo 280 kilometres (170 mi) southwest of Manila, Philippines.	13°55′N 118°30′E
USS Tang	United States Navy	25 October 1945	A Balao-class submarine sunk by the circular run of her own torpedo in the Formosa Strait off the coast of China.	25°06′N 119°31′E
Tek Sing	Qing dynasty	6 February 1822	A junk that ran aground on a reef in the Gaspar Strait with nearly 2,000 people on board.	2°24′54.27″S 107°04′10.17″E
Tsuga	Imperial Japanese Navy	15 January 1945	A Momi-class destroyer sunk off Mako in the Pescarores Islands by United States Navy aircraft during the South China Sea raid.	23°33′N 119°33′E
Unebi	Imperial Japanese Navy	3 December 1886	A protected cruiser missing in the South China Sea after departing Singapore on 3 December 1886 bound for Tokyo Bay.	
Ural Maru	Imperial Japanese Navy	27 September 1944	A hospital ship that was torpedoed by USS Flasher 240 kilometres (150 mi) west of Luzon, Philippines.	15°40′N 117°18′E
HNLMS Van Ghent	Royal Netherlands Navy	15 February 1942	An Admiralen-class destroyer wrecked on a rock and subsequently scuttled in Gaspar Strait.	
Velasco	Spanish Navy	1 May 1898	A Velasco-class unprotected cruiser sunk by United States Navy warships in Manila Bay during the Battle of Manila Bay.	
Vũng Tàu shipwreck			The wreck of a lorcha that was discovered 100 miles (160 km) from Vũng Tàu, Vietnam. It dates from around 1690 and was carrying millions of dollars' worth of porcelain when it sank.	
Yaku	Imperial Japanese Navy	23 February 1945	A kaibōkan that was torpedoed by USS Hammerhead.	12°44′N 109°29′E
Yasoshima	Imperial Japanese Navy	25 November 1944	A kaibōkan sunk by the United States Navy aircraft west of Luzon.	
Yu 1	Imperial Japanese Navy	2 January 1945	A Yu-1-class transport submarine sunk by U.S. aircraft in Lingayen Gulf just off Port Poro on the coast of Luzon, Philippines.	
Yu 2	Imperial Japanese Navy	28 November 1944	A Yu-1-class transport submarine sunk by the United States Navy destroyers USS Saufley, USS Waller, USS Pringle, and USS Renshaw in the Camotes Sea near Pacijan Island, Philippines.	
Yu 3	Imperial Japanese Navy	5 January 1945	A Yu-1-class transport submarine which ran aground and was scuttled while under attack by U.S. aircraft in Lingayen Gulf just off Damortis on the coast of Luzon, Philippines.	

=== Sulu Sea ===
Ship	Flag	Sunk date	Notes	Coordinates
Abukuma	Imperial Japanese Navy	26 October 1944	A Nagara-class light cruiser sunk by United States Army Air Forces aircraft off Negros Island during the Battle of Leyte Gulf.	09°20′N 122°32′E
USS Cisco	United States Navy	28 September 1943	A Balao-class submarine sunk by Imperial Japanese Navy forces west of Mindanao.	09°47′N 121°44′E
USS Flier	United States Navy	13 August 1944	A Gato-class submarine sunk by a mine in the Balabac Strait.	07°58′43.21″N 117°15′23.79″E
Noshiro	Imperial Japanese Navy	26 October 1944	An Agano-class light cruiser sunk by United States Navy aircraft south of Mindoro during the Battle of Leyte Gulf.	11°42′N 121°41′E
USS Ommaney Bay	United States Navy	4 January 1945	A Casablanca-class escort carrier scuttled after sustaining damage in an attack by Japanese kamikaze aircraft.	11°25′N 121°19′E
PT-32	United States Navy	13 March 1942	An Elco 77'-class torpedo boat that was scuttled by gunfire from USS Permit one mile (1.6 km) southwest of Taguayan Island after being disabled.	10°58′N 121°12′E
USS Robalo	United States Navy	26 July 1944	A Gato-class submarine sunk by a mine in the Balabac Strait off the east coast of Balabac Island.	07°56.45′N 117°15.85′E

=== Visayan Sea ===
Ship	Flag	Sunk date	Notes	Coordinates
Kinu	Imperial Japanese Navy	26 October 1944	A Nagara-class light cruiser sunk by United States Navy aircraft southwest of Masbate during the Battle of Leyte Gulf.	11°45′N 123°11′E
Uzuki	Imperial Japanese Navy	12 December 1944	A Mutsuki-class destroyer sunk by the United States Navy PT boats PT-490 and PT-492 50 nautical miles (93 km; 58 mi) northeast of Cebu.	11°03′N 124°23′E

=== Yellow Sea ===
Ship	Flag	Sunk date	Notes	Coordinates
Akatsuki	Imperial Japanese Navy	17 May 1904	An Akatsuki-class destroyer that sank after striking a mine off Dalniy southeast of Tieshan, China.	38°38′N 121°05′E
Atago	Imperial Japanese Navy	6 November 1904	A gunboat that ran aground in Korea Bay off Port Arthur, China.	38°24′N 120°55′E
Bayan	Imperial Russian Navy	9 December 1904	A Bayan-class armored cruiser sunk by Imperial Japanese Army howitzers at Port Arthur, China, during the Siege of Port Arthur.	
Boyarin	Imperial Russian Navy	12 February 1904	A protected cruiser sunk by a mine near the entrance to Port Arthur, China.	
USS Escolar	United States Navy	17 October 1944	A Balao-class submarine that went missing in the Yellow Sea.	
Gyōkū Maru	Japan	18 September 1944	A cargo ship that was sunk by the American submarine USS Thresher.	35°02′N 124°24′E
Hatsuse	Imperial Japanese Navy	15 May 1904	A Shikishima-class battleship that struck a mine in Korea Bay off Port Arthur, China.	38°37′N 121°20′E
Heien	Imperial Japanese Navy	18 September 1904	A gunboat that sank in heavy weather after striking a mine in Korea Bay off Pigeon Bay, west of Port Arthur, China.	38.9500°N 120.9333°E
Jingyuan	Imperial Chinese Navy	17 September 1894	An armored cruiser that was sunk in the Battle of Yalu River.	39°12′50″N 123°07′35″E
Kaimon	Imperial Japanese Navy	5 July 1904	A steam corvette that struck a mine and sank in Korea Bay off Port Arthur, China.	38°50′N 121°50′E
Kenkon Maru No. 12	Japan	30 May 1928	A steamship that sank in a collision 140 nautical miles (260 km; 160 mi) southeast of Qingdao, China.	
Korietz	Imperial Russian Navy	9 February 1904	A gunboat scuttled off Chemulpo, Korea, after the Battle of Chemulpo Bay.	
Miyako	Imperial Japanese Navy	14 May 1904	An unprotected cruiser that struck a mine and sank in Korea Bay off Dairen, China.	
Ōshima	Imperial Japanese Navy	18 May 1904	A gunboat that sank in a collision with the Japanese gunboat Akagi in Korea Bay off Port Arthur, China.	39°01′N 121°08′E
Pallada	Imperial Russian Navy	8 December 1904	A Pallada-class protected cruiser sunk in the harbor at Port Arthur, China, by Imperial Japanese Army howitzers during the Siege of Port Arthur.	
Peresvet	Imperial Russian Navy	7 December 1904	A Peresvet-class battleship scuttled at Port Arthur, China, during the Siege of Port Arthur.	
Petropavlovsk	Imperial Russian Navy	13 April 1904	A Petropavlovsk-class battleship that struck a mine in Korea Bay off Port Arthur, China.	
Pobeda	Imperial Russian Navy	7 December 1904	A Peresvet-class battleship sunk by Imperial Japanese Army artillery at Port Arthur, China, during the Siege of Port Arthur.	
Poltava	Imperial Russian Navy	5 December 1904	A Petropavlovsk-class battleship sunk in the harbor at Port Arthur, China, by Imperial Japanese Army artillery during the Siege of Port Arthur.	
HMS Poseidon	Royal Navy	9 June 1931	A Parthian-class submarine that collided with the Chinese merchant steamer Yuta 20 nautical miles (37 km; 23 mi) north of Weihai, China.	37°50′N 122°14′E
Retvizan	Imperial Russian Navy	6 December 1904	A battleship sunk in the harbor at Port Arthur, China, by Imperial Japanese Army howitzers during the Siege of Port Arthur.	
SMS S90	Imperial German Navy	17 October 1914	An S90-class torpedo boat beached and scuttled off Qingdao, China during the Siege of Tsingtao.	
Saien	Imperial Japanese Navy	30 November 1904	A protected cruiser sunk by a mine in the Bohai Sea one nautical mile (1.9 km; 1.2 mi) off the coast of the Liaodong Peninsula between Pigeon Bay and Louisa Bay.	38°51′N 121°05′E
USS Scorpion	United States Navy	5 January 1944	A Gato-class submarine that went missing in the Yellow Sea.	
Sevastopol	Imperial Russian Navy	2 January 1905	A Petropavlovsk-class battleship scuttled in Korea Bay off the entrance to Port Arthur, China, at the end of the Siege of Port Arthur.	38.8125°N 121.241667°E
Shirotae	Imperial Japanese Navy	31 August 1914	A Kamikaze-class destroyer wrecked in Kiaochow Bay off Tsingtao, China, during the Siege of Tsingtao.	
Steregushchiy	Imperial Russian Navy	10 March 1904	A Sokol-class destroyer sunk by Imperial Japanese Navy warships off the Shandong Peninsula 7 nautical miles (13 km; 8.1 mi) southeast of Mount Laoteshan and 6 nautical miles (11 km; 6.9 mi) from the Lushun Lighthouse.	
Takachiho	Imperial Japanese Navy	17 October 1914	A former Naniwa-class protected cruiser converted into a minelayer torpedoed off Tsingtao, China, by the Imperial German Navy torpedo boat SMS S90 during the Siege of Tsingtao.	
Takasago	Imperial Japanese Navy	13 December 1904	A protected cruiser that struck a mine in Korea Bay 37 nautical miles (69 km; 43 mi) south of Port Arthur, China.	38°10′N 121°15′E
Tchoung King	People's Liberation Army Navy	March 1949	An Arethusa-class light cruiser sunk by Republic of China Air Force aircraft at Huludao, China.	
Varyag	Imperial Russian Navy	9 February 1904	A protected cruiser scuttled off Chemulpo, Korea, after the Battle of Chemulpo Bay.	
Yashima	Imperial Japanese Navy	15 May 1904	A Fuji-class battleship that struck mines and sank in Korea Bay.	38°34′N 121°40′E
Yoshino	Imperial Japanese Navy	15 May 1904	A protected cruiser that collided with the Japanese armored cruiser Kasuga off Weihai, China.	38°07′N 122°33′E
Zhiyuan	Imperial Chinese Navy	17 September 1894	An armored cruiser that was sunk in the Battle of Yalu River.	39°12′50″N 123°07′35″E

== South Pacific ==
Ship	Flag	Sunk date	Notes	Coordinates
USS Aaron Ward	United States Navy	7 April 1943	A Gleaves-class destroyer sunk by Imperial Japanese Navy aircraft in Ironbottom Sound off the south coast of Florida Island in the Solomon Islands.	09°10′30″S 160°12′00″E
HMAS AE1	Royal Australian Navy	14 September 1914	An E-class submarine that sank off the Duke of York Islands in St George's Channel between New Britain and New Ireland in the Bismarck Archipelago	
Akatsuki	Imperial Japanese Navy	13 November 1942	An Akatsuki-class destroyer sunk by United States Navy warships in Ironbottom Sound near Savo Island during the First Naval Battle of Guadalcanal.	09°17′S 159°56′E
Amaranth	United States	30 August 1913	A barquentine that was wrecked on the southeast shore of Jarvis Island.	0°22′S 160°01′W
Arashi	Imperial Japanese Navy	7 August 1943	A Kagerō-class destroyer torpedoed in Vella Gulf by United States Navy destroyers during the Battle of Vella Gulf.	07°50′S 156°55′E
Arashio	Imperial Japanese Navy	4 March 1943	An Asashio-class destroyer that was sunk in the Battle of the Bismarck Sea.	07°15′S 148°30′E
Asagiri	Imperial Japanese Navy	28 August 1942	A Fubuki-class destroyer that was sunk by US aircraft 60 nautical miles (110 km; 69 mi) northeast of Savo Island.	08°0′S 160°10′E
USS Astoria	United States Navy	9 August 1942	A New Orleans-class heavy cruiser sunk by Japanese warships in Ironbottom Sound during the Battle of Savo Island.	09°12′33″S 159°52′03″E
USS Atlanta	United States Navy	13 November 1942	An Atlanta-class light cruiser scuttled in Ironbottom Sound 3 nautical miles (5.6 km; 3.5 mi) west of Lunga Point, Guadalcanal, after sustaining damage in combat with Japanese warships in the First Naval Battle of Guadalcanal.	
Ayanami	Imperial Japanese Navy	15 November 1942	A Fubuki-class destroyer scuttled in Ironbottom Sound off Guadalcanal after sustaining damage in combat with the United States Navy battleship USS Washington during the Second Naval Battle of Guadalcanal.	09°10′S 159°52′E
USS Barton	United States Navy	13 November 1942	A Benson-class destroyer sunk by the Japanese destroyer Amatsukaze in Ironbottom Sound off Guadalcanal during the First Naval Battle of Guadalcanal.	
USS Benham	United States Navy	15 November 1942	A Benham-class destroyer scuttled in Ironbottom Sound off Guadalcanal after sustaining damage in combat with Japanese warships during the Second Naval Battle of Guadalcanal.	
HMAS Canberra	Royal Australian Navy	9 August 1942	A County-class heavy cruiser scuttled in Ironbottom Sound off Guadalcanal after sustaining damage in combat with Japanese warships during the Battle of Savo Island.	09°12′29″S 159°54′46″E
Cha-5	Imperial Japanese Navy	18 August 1943	A No.1-class auxiliary submarine chaser sunk by United States Navy destroyers near Vella Lavella during the Battle off Horaniu.	
Cha-12	Imperial Japanese Navy	18 August 1943	A No.1-class auxiliary submarine chaser sunk by United States Navy destroyers near Vella Lavella during the Battle off Horaniu.	
USS Chevalier	United States Navy	7 October 1943	A Fletcher-class destroyer scuttled near Vella Lavella after suffering damage in combat with Japanese warships during the Naval Battle of Vella Lavella.	07°30′S 156°14′E
USS Chicago	United States Navy	30 January 1943	A Northampton-class heavy cruiser sunk by Japanese aircraft northeast of Rennell Island during the Battle of Rennell Island.	11°25′S 160°56′E
USS Cushing	United States Navy	13 November 1942	A Mahan-class destroyer that sank in Ironbottom Sound 3,500 yards (3,200 m) southeast of Savo Island after sustaining damage in combat with Japanese warships during the First Naval Battle of Guadalcanal.	
USS De Haven	United States Navy	1 February 1943	A Fletcher-class destroyer sunk by Imperial Japanese Navy dive bomber aircraft in Ironbottom Sound 2 nautical miles (3.7 km; 2.3 mi) east of Savo Island in the Solomon Islands.	09°09′S 159°52′E
USS Duncan	United States Navy	12 October 1942	A Gleaves-class destroyer that sank 6 nautical miles (11 km; 6.9 mi) north of Savo Island in the Solomon Islands after sustaining damage in combat with Japanese warships in the Battle of Cape Esperance.	
Essex	United States	20 November 1820	A whaler that a sperm whale attacked and sank, inspiring the novel Moby Dick.	0°41′S 118°00′W
Fubuki	Imperial Japanese Navy	11 October 1942	A Fubuki-class destroyer sunk by the United States Navy heavy cruiser USS San Francisco and light cruiser USS Boise off Guadalcanal in the Battle of Cape Esperance.	09°06′S 159°39′E
Furutaka	Imperial Japanese Navy	12 October 1942	A Furutaka-class heavy cruiser sunk by the United States Navy heavy cruiser USS Salt Lake City and destroyer USS Duncan off Guadalcanal in the Battle of Cape Esperance.	09°02′S 159°33′E
USS Grampus	United States Navy	5 March 1943	A Tambor-class submarine probably sunk by the Japanese destroyers Minegumo and Murasame in Blackett Strait in the Solomon Islands.	
USS Gregory	United States Navy	5 September 1942	A Wickes-class fast transport sunk by Japanese destroyers in Ironbottom Sound off Guadalcanal.	
USS Gwin	United States Navy	13 July 1943	A Gleaves-class destroyer scuttled off Kolombangara in the Solomon Islands after suffering damage in combat with Japanese warships during the Battle of Kolombangara.	07°41′S 157°27′E
Hagikaze	Imperial Japanese Navy	7 August 1943	A Kagerō-class destroyer torpedoed in Vella Gulf by United States Navy destroyers during the Battle of Vella Gulf.	07°50′S 156°55′E
Harriet	United Kingdom	16 July 1837	A whaler wrecked on Providence Reef in the Fiji Islands.	
Hatsukaze	Imperial Japanese Navy	2 November 1943	A Kagerō-class destroyer sunk in Empress Augusta Bay off Bougainville Island by United States Navy warships during the Battle of Empress Augusta Bay.	06°01′S 153°58′E
USS Helena	United States Navy	6 July 1943	A Brooklyn-class light cruiser torpedoed by Japanese destroyers in the Kula Gulf during the Battle of Kula Gulf.	
Hiei	Imperial Japanese Navy	13 November 1942	A Kongō-class battleship scuttled northwest of Savo Island in the Solomon Islands after suffering damage in combat with U.S. forces during the First Naval Battle of Guadalcanal.	
USS Hornet	United States Navy	27 October 1942	A Yorktown-class aircraft carrier that was sunk at the Battle of the Santa Cruz Islands.	8°38′23″S 166°42′34″E
I-1	Imperial Japanese Navy	29 January 1943	A J1-type submarine which was wrecked on the coast of Guadalcanal in the Solomon Islands after suffering heavy damage in combat with the Royal New Zealand Navy minesweepers HMNZS Kiwi and HMNZS Moa.	09°13′S 159°40′E
I-3	Imperial Japanese Navy	9 December 1942	A J1-type submarine torpedoed in Kamimbo Bay on the coast of Guadalcanal in the Solomon Islands by the United States Navy motor torpedo boat PT-59.	09°12′S 159°42′E
I-11	Imperial Japanese Navy	11 January 1944	A Type A1 submarine missing in the vicinity of Funafuti in the Ellice Islands.	
I-15	Imperial Japanese Navy	10 November 1942	A Type B1 submarine sunk off San Cristobal in the Solomon Islands by the United States Navy destroyer minesweeper USS Southard.	10°13′S 161°09′E
I-25	Imperial Japanese Navy	10 November 1942	A Type B1 submarine sunk between the New Hebrides Islands and the southeastern Solomon Islands by the United States Navy destroyer USS Patterson.	13°10′S 165°27′E
I-123	Imperial Japanese Navy	29 August 1942	A Kiraisen-type submarine sunk by the United States Navy destroyer minelayer USS Gamble 60 nautical miles (110 km; 69 mi) east of Savo Island in the Solomon Islands.	09°21′S 160°43′E
I-172	Imperial Japanese Navy	28 October 1942	A Kaidai 6-type submarine missing southwest of San Cristobal in the Solomon Islands after either 28 October or 3 November 1942. Possibly sunk by a United States Navy aircraft on 28 October at 13°15′S 162°45′E; by the destroyer USS McCalla on 3 November 1942 southwest of San Cristobal at 10°53′S 161°50′E; or by the United States Navy destroyer minesweeper USS Southard at the southern end of Indispensable Strait at 10°13′S 161°09′E on 10 November 1942.	
I-176	Imperial Japanese Navy	28 October 1942	A Kaidai 7-type submarine sunk by the United States Navy destroyers USS Franks, USS Haggard and USS Johnston off Buka Island in the Solomon Islands.	4°1′S 156°29′E
I-181	Imperial Japanese Navy	13 February 1943	A Kaidai 7-type submarine missing after departing Rabaul bound for New Guinea.	
Jintsū	Imperial Japanese Navy	13 July 1943	A Sendai-class light cruiser sunk off Kolombangara in the Solomon Islands by United States Navy warships during the Battle of Kolombangara.	07°38′S 157°06′E
USS Juneau	United States Navy	13 November 1942	An Atlanta-class light cruiser torpedoed by the Japanese submarine I-26 southeast of Guadalcanal in the aftermath of the First Naval Battle of Guadalcanal.	10°34′S 161°04′E
Kako	Imperial Japanese Navy	10 August 1942	A Furutaka-class cruiser torpedoed by the United States Navy submarine USS S-44 off Simbari Island.	02°28′S 152°11′E
Kawakaze	Imperial Japanese Navy	7 August 1943	A Kagerō-class destroyer torpedoed in Vella Gulf by United States Navy destroyers during the Battle of Vella Gulf.	07°50′S 156°54′E
Kirishima	Imperial Japanese Navy	15 November 1942	A Kongō-class battleship sunk in Ironbottom Sound in the Solomon Islands by the United States Navy battleship USS Washington in the Second Naval Battle of Guadalcanal.	
USS Kanawha	United States Navy	8 April 1943	A Kanawha-class fleet replenishment oiler that sank off the west coast of Tulagi in the Solomon Islands after suffering damage in an attack by Imperial Japanese Navy aircraft.	
USS Laffey	United States Navy	13 November 1942	A Benson-class destroyer sunk by Japanese warships in Ironbottom Sound off Guadalcanal during the First Naval Battle of Guadalcanal.	
USS Little	United States Navy	5 September 1942	A Wickes-class fast transport sunk by Japanese destroyers in Ironbottom Sound off Guadalcanal.	
Makigumo	Imperial Japanese Navy	1 February 1943	A Yūgumo-class destroyer scuttled in Ironbottom Sound 3 nautical miles (5.6 km; 3.5 mi) south-southwest of Savo Island after striking a mine.	09°15′S 159°47′E
Makinami	Imperial Japanese Navy	25 November 1943	A Yūgumo-class destroyer sunk by United States Navy destroyers 55 nautical miles (102 km; 63 mi) east southeast of Cape St. George on New Ireland in the Battle of Cape St. George.	05°14′S 153°50′E
Minegumo	Imperial Japanese Navy	5 March 1943	An Asashio-class destroyer sunk in Blackett Strait in the Solomon Islands by U.S. light cruisers and destroyers in the Battle of Blackett Strait.	08°01′S 157°14′E
HMNZS Moa	Royal New Zealand Navy	7 April 1943	A Bird-class minesweeper sunk by Japanese aircraft in the harbour at Tulagi in the Solomon Islands.	09°05′42.1″S 160°08′57.20″E
USS Monssen	United States Navy	13 November 1942	A Gleaves-class destroyer sunk by Japanese warships in Ironbottom Sound off Guadalcanal during the First Naval Battle of Guadalcanal.	
Murasame	Imperial Japanese Navy	5 March 1943	A Shiratsuyu-class destroyer sunk in Blackett Strait in the Solomon Islands by U.S. light cruisers and destroyers in the Battle of Blackett Strait.	08°03′S 157°13′E
Mutsuki	Imperial Japanese Navy	25 August 1942	A Mutsuki-class destroyer that was sunk by U.S. aircraft 40 nautical miles (74 km; 46 mi) northeast of Santa Isabel Island during the Battle of the Eastern Solomons.	7°47′S 160°13′E
Nagatsuki	Imperial Japanese Navy	6 July 1943	A Mutsuki-class destroyer beached near Bambari Harbor on the coast of Kolombangara, 5 miles (8.0 km) north of Vila during the Battle of Kula Gulf and destroyed by Allied aircraft later in the day.	08°02′S 157°12′E
USS Navajo	United States Navy	12 September 1943	A Navajo-class fleet tug that was torpedoed by I-39 near Vanuatu.	14°58′35″S 169°17′57″E
Niizuki	Imperial Japanese Navy	6 July 1943	An Akatsuki-class destroyer sunk in the Kula Gulf 5 nautical miles (9.3 km; 5.8 mi) east of Kolombangara during the Battle of Kula Gulf.	07°57′S 157°12′E
USS Northampton	United States Navy	1 December 1942	A Northampton-class heavy cruiser sunk by Japanese warships in Ironbottom Sound south southeast of Savo Island in the Battle of Tassafaronga.	09°12′S 159°50′E
Norwich City	United Kingdom	29 November 1929	An oil-fired steam freighter that sank on northwest Nikumaroro.	4°39′39″S 174°32′40″W
Nuestra Señora del Triunfo	Spanish Navy	25 November 1864	A Lealtad-class screw frigate destroyed by fire off Pisco, Peru.	
USS O'Brien	United States Navy	19 October 1942	A Sims-class destroyer that was torpedoed by I-19 and sank over a month later northeast of Samoa.	13°30′S 171°18′W
Ōnami	Imperial Japanese Navy	25 November 1943	A Yūgumo-class destroyer torpedoed by United States Navy destroyers between Buka Island and Cape St. George on New Ireland in the Battle of Cape St. George.	05°15′S 153°49′E
Ōshio	Imperial Japanese Navy	20 February 1943	An Asashio-class destroyer that was torpedoed by USS Albacore 70 nautical miles (130 km; 81 mi) northeast of Manus Island.	00°50′S 146°06′E
HMNZS Philomel	Royal New Zealand Navy	6 August 1949	A decommissioned Pearl-class protected cruiser scuttled near Cuvier Island off the northeast coast of North Island, New Zealand.	
USS Preston	United States Navy	14 November 1942	A Mahan-class destroyer sunk in Ironbottom Sound off Guadalcanal by the Japanese light cruiser Nagara during the Second Naval Battle of Guadalcanal.	
USS Porter	United States Navy	26 October 1942	A Porter-class destroyer scuttled north of the Solomon Islands after sustaining damage in the Battle of the Santa Cruz Islands.	08°32′S 167°17′E
Princess Ashika	Tonga	5 August 2009	An inter-island ferry that sank northeast of Nukuʻalofa, Tonga.	
PT-109	United States Navy	2 August 1943	A patrol torpedo boat sunk in a collision with the Japanese destroyer Amagiri between Kolombangara and Ghizo Island in the Solomon Islands.	08°03′S 156°56′E
USS Quincy	United States Navy	9 August 1942	A New Orleans-class heavy cruiser sunk by Japanese warships in Ironbottom Sound during the Battle of Savo Island.	09°04′32″S 159°58′30″E
Ro-34	Imperial Japanese Navy	7 April 1943	A Kaichu 6-type submarine sunk by the United States Navy destroyer USS Strong off San Cristobal in the Solomon Islands.	10°05′S 162°08′E
Ro-35	Imperial Japanese Navy	25 August 1943	A Kaichu 7-type submarine missing after 25 August 1943. Probably sunk that evening by the United States Navy destroyer USS Patterson 170 nautical miles (310 km; 200 mi) from Ndeni in the Santa Cruz Islands.	12°57′S 164°23′E
Ro-37	Imperial Japanese Navy	22 January 1944	A Kaichu 7-type submarine sunk by the United States Navy destroyer USS Buchanan 130 nautical miles (240 km; 150 mi) east southeast of San Cristobal in the Solomon Islands.	11°47′S 164°17′E
Ro-100	Imperial Japanese Navy	25 November 1943	A Ro-100-class submarine sunk by a mine in the Bougainville Strait 2 nautical miles (3.7 km; 2.3 mi) west of Oema Island in the Solomon Islands.	06°50′S 155°58′E
Ro-101	Imperial Japanese Navy	15 September 1943	A Ro-100-class submarine sunk by the United States Navy destroyer USS Saufley and a United States Navy aircraft in the southeastern Solomon Islands southeast of San Cristobal.	10°57′S 163°56′E
Ro-103	Imperial Japanese Navy	28 July 1943	A Ro-100-class submarine missing north of New Georgia in the Solomon Islands.	
Ro-108	Imperial Japanese Navy	26 May 1944	A Ro-100-class submarine sunk by the United States Navy destroyer escort USS England north of the Admiralty Islands.	00°32′S 148°35′E
Ryūjō	Imperial Japanese Navy	24 August 1942	An aircraft carrier sunk by United States Navy aircraft north of the Solomon Islands during the Battle of the Eastern Solomons.	06°10′S 160°50′E
USS Sculpin	United States Navy	19 November 1943	A Sargo-class submarine that was scuttled off Truk while under attack from Japanese destroyers.	0°0′N 152°50′E
USS Strong	United States Navy	5 July 1943	A Fletcher-class destroyer torpedoed in Bairoko Harbor on the coast of New Georgia by the Japanese destroyer Niizuki.	08°05′S 157°15′E
Tahiti	United Kingdom	17 August 1930	An ocean liner that sank 400 nautical miles (740 km; 460 mi) off Raratonga.	
Takanami	Imperial Japanese Navy	30 November 1942	A Yūgumo-class destroyer sunk by United States Navy warships south-southwest of Savo Island in the Battle of Tassafaronga.	09°14′S 159°49′E
Tuaikaepau	New Zealand	6 July 1962	A cutter that ran aground on the South Minerva Reef.	23°55′19″S 179°05′34″W
USS Vincennes	United States Navy	9 August 1942	A New Orleans-class heavy cruiser sunk by Japanese warships in Ironbottom Sound during the Battle of Savo Island.	09°07′17″S 159°52′48″E
USS Walke	United States Navy	15 November 1942	A Sims-class destroyer sunk in Ironbottom Sound off Guadalcanal by Japanese warships during the Second Naval Battle of Guadalcanal.	
Yūdachi	Imperial Japanese Navy	13 November 1942	A Shiratsuyu-class destroyer sunk by the United States Navy heavy cruiser USS Portland in Ironbottom Sound southeast of Savo Island during the First Naval Battle of Guadalcanal.	09°14′S 159°52′E
Yūgiri	Imperial Japanese Navy	25 November 1943	A Fubuki-class destroyer sunk by United States Navy destroyers between Buka Island and Cape St. George on New Ireland in the Battle of Cape St. George.	04°44′S 154°00′E
Yūgumo	Imperial Japanese Navy	6 October 1943	A Yūgumo-class destroyer sunk by United States Navy warships 15 nautical miles (28 km; 17 mi) northwest of Vella Lavella during the Naval Battle of Vella Lavella.	07°33′S 156°14′E
Yura	Imperial Japanese Navy	25 October 1942	A Nagara-class light cruiser scuttled east of Malaita in the Solomon Islands after sustaining damage in attacks by U.S. aircraft.	08°15′S 159°57′E

=== Bismarck Sea ===
Ship	Flag	Sunk date	Notes	Coordinates
USS Amberjack	United States Navy	16 February 1943	A Gato-class submarine sunk by Japanese warships off Rabaul.	05°05′S 152°37′E
USS Argonaut	United States Navy	10 January 1943	A V type submarine sunk by Japanese destroyers off Rabaul.	05°40′14″S 153°54′56″E
I-2	Imperial Japanese Navy	7 April 1944	A J1 type submarine sunk by the United States Navy destroyer USS Saufley 50 nautical miles (93 km; 58 mi) west northwest of New Hanover Island.	02°17′S 149°14′E
I-168	Imperial Japanese Navy	27 July 1943	A Kaidai 6-type submarine sunk by the United States Navy submarine USS Scamp 60 nautical miles (110 km; 69 mi) off New Hanover Island.	02°50′S 149°01′E
Shimakaze	Imperial Japanese Navy	12 January 1943	A Minekaze-class destroyer that was torpedoed by the United States Navy submarine USS Guardfish near Kavieng, New Ireland.	02°51′S 149°43′E
Tenryū	Imperial Japanese Navy	19 December 1942	A Tenryū-class light cruiser that was torpedoed by the United States Navy submarine USS Albacore off Madang, New Guinea.	05°12′S 145°56′E

=== Chilean Sea ===
Ship	Flag	Sunk date	Notes	Coordinates
Almirante Latorre	Chilean Navy	11 April 2005	A decommissioned County-class destroyer that sank in the southeastern Pacific Ocean off the coast of Chile while under tow to the shipbreakers.	35°58′0″S 77°22′0″W
HMS Good Hope	Royal Navy	1 November 1914	A Drake-class armoured cruiser sunk by the Imperial German Navy armoured cruiser SMS Scharnhorst near Coronel, Chile, in the Battle of Coronel.	36°59′01″S 073°48′49″W
USS La Moure County	United States Navy	10 July 2001	A Newport-class tank landing ship that was sunk as a target in the southeastern Pacific Ocean about 150 nautical miles (280 km; 170 mi) west of Valparaíso, Chile.	32°49′08″S 74°17′09″W
HMS Monmouth	Royal Navy	1 November 1914	A Monmouth-class armoured cruiser sunk by the Imperial German Navy armoured cruiser SMS Gneisenau and light cruiser SMS Nürnberg near Coronel, Chile, in the Battle of Coronel.	36°53′53″S 073°50′45″W

=== Coral Sea ===
Ship	Flag	Sunk date	Notes	Coordinates
USS Aludra	United States Navy	23 June 1943	A Crater-class cargo ship that was torpedoed by the Japanese submarine Ro-103 southeast of the Solomon Islands.	11°35′S 162°8′E
USS Deimos	United States Navy	23 June 1943	A Crater-class cargo ship that was scuttled off the Solomon Islands.	11°26′S 162°01′E
USS Elliot	United States Navy	22 June 2005	A Spruance-class destroyer that was sunk as a target 100 nautical miles (190 km; 120 mi) east of Fraser Island, Australia.	24°43′S 155°50′E
I-17	Imperial Japanese Navy	19 August 1943	A Type B1 submarine that was sunk by US aircraft and the Royal New Zealand Navy minesweeper HMNZS Tui south of New Caledonia.	23°26′S 166°50′E
I-18	Imperial Japanese Navy	11 February 1943	A Type C1 submarine sunk 200 nautical miles (370 km; 230 mi) south of San Cristobal in the Solomon Islands by the United States Navy destroyer USS Fletcher.	14°15′S 161°53′E
I-20	Imperial Japanese Navy	1 or 3 September 1943	A Type C1 submarine sunk off Espiritu Santo either by the United States Navy destroyers USS Wadsworth on 1 September or USS Ellet on 3 September.	14°15′S 161°53′E or 13°10′S 165°28′E
I-22	Imperial Japanese Navy	6 October 1942	A Type C1 submarine sunk southwest of Guadalcanal in the Solomon Islands by a United States Navy aircraft.	11°22′S 162°20′E
I-182	Imperial Japanese Navy	1 or 3 September 1943	A Kaidai 7-type submarine sunk off Espiritu Santo either by the United States Navy destroyers USS Wadsworth on 1 September or USS Ellet on 3 September.	14°15′S 161°53′E or 13°10′S 165°28′E
USS Lexington	United States Navy	8 May 1942	A Lexington-class aircraft carrier that was sunk at the Battle of the Coral Sea.	15°11′57″S 155°27′23″E
Mamutu	Australia	7 August 1942	A motor vessel sunk by the Imperial Japanese Navy submarine Ro-33 in the Gulf of Papua.	09°11′S 144°12′E
USS Neosho	United States Navy	11 May 1942	A Cimarron-class oiler scuttled after sustaining damage in an attack by Imperial Japanese Navy aircraft in the Battle of the Coral Sea.	
Ro-33	Imperial Japanese Navy	29 August 1942	A Kaichu 6-type submarine sunk by the Royal Australian Navy destroyer HMAS Arunta in the Gulf of Papua.	09°36′S 147°06′E
Ro-102	Imperial Japanese Navy	9 May 1943	A Ro-100-class submarine missing south of New Guinea.	
Royal Charlotte	United Kingdom	11 June 1825	A merchant ship that ran aground on Frederick Reefs.	
Shōhō	Imperial Japanese Navy	6 May 1942	A Zuihō-class aircraft carrier that was sunk in the Battle of the Coral Sea.	16°07′14.17″S 151°54′47.02″E
USS Sims	United States Navy	7 May 1942	A Sims-class destroyer sunk by Imperial Japanese Navy aircraft in the Battle of the Coral Sea.	15.166°S 158.0833°E
USS Wasp	United States Navy	15 September 1942	A Wasp-class aircraft carrier that was torpedoed by I-19 en route to Guadalcanal.	12°24′58″S 164°8′0″E
USS William H. Standley	United States Navy	23 June 2005	A Belknap-class cruiser that was sunk as a target 100 nautical miles (185 km; 115 mi) east of Fraser Island, Australia.	24°47′S 155°48′E

=== Java Sea ===
Ship	Flag	Sunk date	Notes	Coordinates
USS Bullhead	United States Navy	6 August 1945	A Balao-class submarine sunk off Bali by Japanese aircraft.	
HNLMS De Ruyter	Royal Netherlands Navy	28 February 1942	A light cruiser sunk off the north coast of Java by the Japanese heavy cruiser Haguro during the Battle of the Java Sea.	05°58′55″S 112°03′57″E
HMS Encounter	Royal Navy	1 March 1942	An E-class destroyer scuttled after sustaining damage in combat with Imperial Japanese Navy warships during the Second Battle of the Java Sea.	05°S 111°E
HNLMS Evertsen	Royal Netherlands Navy	1 March 1942	An Admiralen-class destroyer wrecked on a reef near Sebuku Island off the coast of Sumatra after sustaining damage in combat with Imperial Japanese Navy destroyers during the Battle of Sunda Strait.	
HMS Exeter	Royal Navy	1 March 1942	An York-class heavy cruiser sunk by Imperial Japanese Navy warships during the Second Battle of the Java Sea.	05°S 111°E
HNLMS Gouden Leeuw	Royal Netherlands Navy	7 March 1942	A Prins van Oranje-class minelayer scuttled off the coast of Java near Surabaya.	
USS Houston	United States Navy	1 March 1942	A Northampton-class cruiser sunk by Japanese warships off Bantam Bay, Java, in the Battle of Sunda Strait.	05°48′45″S 106°07′55″E
Isuzu	Imperial Japanese Navy	7 April 1945	A Nagara-class light cruiser torpedoed by the United States Navy submarines USS Gabilan and USS Charr 60 nautical miles (110 km; 69 mi) northwest of Bima on Sumbawa .	07°38′S 118°09′E
HNLMS Java	Royal Netherlands Navy	27 February 1942	A Java-class light cruiser sunk off the north coast of Java by the Japanese heavy cruiser Nachi during the Battle of the Java Sea.	06°00′01″S 112°05′00″E
HMS Jupiter	Royal Navy	27 February 1942	A J-class destroyer sunk by a mine off the north coast of Java during the Battle of the Java Sea.	06°45′S 112°06′E
HNLMS K VII	Royal Netherlands Navy	18 February 1942	A K V-class submarine sunk by Japanese bomber aircraft in the harbor at Surabaya, Java.	
HNLMS K X	Royal Netherlands Navy	18 February 1942	A K VIII-class submarine scuttled at Surabaya, Java.	
HNLMS K XIII	Royal Netherlands Navy	18 February 1942	A K XI-class submarine scuttled at Surabaya, Java.	
HNLMS Kortenaer	Royal Netherlands Navy	27 February 1942	An Admiralen-class destroyer sunk off the north coast of Java by the Japanese heavy cruiser Haguro during the Battle of the Java Sea.	06°29′S 112°05′E
HMAS Perth	Royal Australian Navy	1 March 1942	A Leander-class light cruiser sunk by Japanese warships off Bantam Bay, Java, in the Battle of Sunda Strait.	05°51′42″S 106°07′52″E
HNLMS Piet Hein	Royal Netherlands Navy	19 February 1942	An Admiralen-class destroyer sunk in the Badung Strait off the southeast coast of Bali by the Japanese destroyer Asashio during the Battle of Badung Strait.	08°40′S 115°20′E
USS Perch	United States Navy	3 March 1942	A Porpoise-class submarine scuttled northwest of Surabaya, Java, after Japanese warships damaged the vessel.	06°30′S 113°50′E
USS Pope	United States Navy	1 March 1942	A Clemson-class destroyer that was sunk by Japanese aircraft and warships during the Second Battle of the Java Sea.	4°00′S 111°30′E
USS Shark	United States Navy	7 February 1942	A Porpoise-class submarine missing in the Java Sea.	
Tencho Maru	Imperial Japanese Army	3 August 1945	A cargo ship that was torpedoed by the submarine HMS Tiptoe.	05°07′S 106°05′E
HNLMS Van Nes	Royal Netherlands Navy	17 February 1942	An Admiralen-class destroyer sunk by aircraft from the Japanese aircraft carrier Ryūjō.	03°27′S 106°38′E
Yosei Maru	Imperial Japanese Navy	13 May 1945	A tanker that was torpedoed by the submarine USS Baya.	06°31′S 111°19′E

=== Solomon Sea ===
Ship	Flag	Sunk date	Notes	Coordinates
Aiyo Maru	Japan	3 March 1943	A cargo ship that was sunk by Allied aircraft in the Battle of the Bismarck Sea.	07°15′S 148°30′E
Asashio	Imperial Japanese Navy	3 March 1943	An Asashio-class destroyer that was sunk by Allied aircraft in the Battle of the Bismarck Sea.	07°15′S 148°15′E
USS Henley	United States Navy	3 October 1943	A Bagley-class destroyer that was torpedoed by Japanese submarine Ro-108.	07°40′S 148°06′E
I-4	Imperial Japanese Navy	21 December 1942	A J1-type submarine torpedoed by the United States Navy submarine USS Seadragon at the southern entrance to St. George's Channel off New Ireland about 20 nautical miles (37 km; 23 mi) from Rabaul.	05°02′S 152°33′E
I-171	Imperial Japanese Navy	1 February 1944	A Kaidai 6-type submarine sunk by the United States Navy destroyers USS Guest and USS Hudson 15 nautical miles (28 km; 17 mi) west of Buka Island in the Solomon Islands.	05°37′S 154°14′E
Kembu Maru	Japan	3 March 1943	A cargo ship that was sunk by Allied aircraft in the Battle of the Bismarck Sea.	07°15′S 148°30′E
Kinugasa	Imperial Japanese Navy	13 November 1942	An Aoba-class cruiser sunk by U.S. aircraft southwest of Rendova Island.	08°45′S 157°00′E
USS McKean	United States Navy	17 November 1943	A Wickes-class destroyer sunk by Japanese aircraft off Bougainville.	06°31′S 154°52′E
Okinoshima	Imperial Japanese Navy	12 May 1942	A minelayer that was torpedoed by USS S-42 and sank under tow in Saint George's Channel.	05°06′S 153°48′E
Oigawa Maru	Japan	3 March 1943	A troopship that was sunk by the motor torpedo boats PT-143 and PT-150 in the Battle of the Bismarck Sea.	06°58′S 148°16′E
USS S-39	United States Navy	13 August 1942	A S-class submarine wrecked off Rossel Island in the Louisiade Archipelago.	11°28′S 154°21′E
Sendai	Imperial Japanese Navy	3 November 1943	A Sendai-class cruiser that was sunk in the Battle of Empress Augusta Bay.	06°10′S 154°20′E
Shirayuki	Imperial Japanese Navy	3 March 1943	A Fubuki-class destroyer that was sunk by Allied aircraft 55 nautical miles (102 km; 63 mi) southeast of Finschhafen, Papua New Guinea.	07°15′S 148°30′E
Sin-ai Maru	Japan	3 March 1943	A troopship that was sunk by Allied aircraft in the Battle of the Bismarck Sea.	07°15′S 148°30′E
Taimei Maru	Japan	3 March 1943	A troopship that was sunk by Allied aircraft in the Battle of the Bismarck Sea.	07°15′S 148°30′E
USS Triton	United States Navy	15 March 1943	A Tambor-class submarine sunk by Japanese destroyers.	
Yayoi	Imperial Japanese Navy	11 September 1942	A Mutsuki-class destroyer sunk by Allied aircraft 8 nautical miles (15 km; 9.2 mi) northwest of Vakuta in the Trobriand Islands.	08°45′S 151°25′E

=== Tasman Sea ===
Ship	Flag	Sunk date	Notes	Coordinates
HMAS Australia	Royal Australian Navy	12 April 1924	A decommissioned Indefatigable-class battlecruiser scuttled 25 nautical miles (46 km; 29 mi) off Sydney Heads, Australia.	33°51′54.21″S 151°44′25.11″E
Elingamite	Australia	9 November 1902	A passenger steamer that ran aground on West Island, one of the Three Kings Islands off New Zealand.	34.186047°S 172.031590°E
Iron Chieftain	Australia	3 June 1942	A bulk carrier that was torpedoed by the Imperial Japanese Navy submarine I-24 about 27 nautical miles (50 km; 31 mi) east of Sydney, Australia.	33°55.892′S 151°45.976′E
I-178	Imperial Japanese Navy	17 June 1943	A Kaidai 7-type submarine sunk by a Royal Australian Air Force aircraft 65 nautical miles (120 km; 75 mi) southeast of Coffs Harbour, Australia.	
HMAS Penguin	Royal Australian Navy	14 September 1932	A decommissioned depot ship, formerly the Challenger-class protected cruiser HMAS Encounter, scuttled off Bondi Beach, Sydney, Australia.	
HMAS Pioneer	Royal Australian Navy	18 February 1931	A decommissioned Pelorus-class protected cruiser scuttled off Sydney Heads, Australia, 4 kilometres (2.2 nmi; 2.5 mi) east of Vaucluse, New South Wales.	33°51.850′S 151°19.844′E
Portmar	United States	16 June 1943	A merchant ship that was torpedoed by the Imperial Japanese Navy submarine I-174 about 35 nautical miles (65 km; 40 mi) east of Smoky Cape, Australia.	
Psyche	Australia	1940	A timber lighter, formerly a Royal Australian Navy Pelorus-class protected cruiser, which sank during a storm at Salamander Bay, New South Wales, Australia.	
