= Matagorda =

Matagorda may refer to:

Geography

- Matagorda, Texas, an unincorporated community in Texas
- Matagorda Bay, on the coast of Texas
- Matagorda County, Texas
- Matagorda Independent School District in Matagorda County, Texas
- Matagorda Island, a barrier island on the coast of Texas
- Matagorda Island State Park, on Matagorda Island in Texas
- The Matagorda Peninsula in Texas

Military and Naval

- United States Air Force
  - Matagorda Island Air Force Base, a base in Texas active during World War II and from 1949 to 1975
- United States Coast Guard
  - USCGC Matagorda, the name of more than one United States Coast Guard ship
- United States Navy
  - USS Matagorda (AVP-22), a seaplane tender in commission from 1941 to 1946
