= Japanese submarine I-63 =

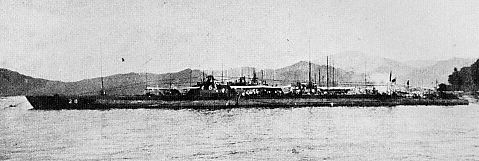
- I-63 and the rest of submarine division 24

History

Empire of Japan
- Name: I-63
- Builder: Sasebo Naval Arsenal, Sasebo, Japan
- Laid down: 12 August 1926
- Launched: 28 September 1927
- Completed: 20 December 1928
- Commissioned: 20 December 1928
- Decommissioned: 20 March 1934
- Recommissioned: 15 November 1934
- Fate: Sunk in collision 2 February 1939; Refloated January 1940; Scrapped
- Stricken: 1 June 1940

General characteristics
- Class & type: Kaidai-class submarine (KD3B Type)
- Displacement: 1,829 t (1,800 long tons) surfaced; 2,337 t (2,300 long tons) submerged
- Length: 101 m (331 ft 4 in)
- Beam: 8 m (26 ft 3 in)
- Draft: 4.9 m (16 ft 1 in)
- Installed power: 6,800 bhp (5,071 kW) (diesels); 1,800 hp (1,342 kW) (electric motors)
- Propulsion: Diesel-electric; 2 × diesel engines; 2 × electric motors
- Speed: 20 knots (37 km/h; 23 mph) surfaced; 8 knots (15 km/h; 9.2 mph) submerged
- Range: 10,000 nmi (19,000 km; 12,000 mi) at 10 knots (19 km/h; 12 mph) surfaced; 90 nmi (170 km; 100 mi) at 3 knots (5.6 km/h; 3.5 mph) submerged
- Test depth: 60 m (200 ft)
- Complement: 60
- Armament: 8 × 533 mm (21 in) torpedo tubes (6 bow, 2 stern); 1 × 120 mm (4.7 in) deck gun

I-63 was an Imperial Japanese Navy Kaidai-class cruiser submarine of the KD3B sub-class commissioned in 1928. She was sunk in an accidental collision with her sister ship I-60 with the loss of most of her crew in early 1939. The wreck was salvaged in 1940 and scrapped.

== Design and description ==
The submarines of the KD3B sub-class were essentially repeats of the preceding KD3A sub-class with minor modifications to improve seakeeping. They displaced 1,829 metric tons (1,800 long tons) surfaced and 2,337 metric tons (2,300 long tons) submerged. The submarines were 101 meters (331 ft 4 in) long, had a beam of 8 meters (26 ft 3 in) and a draft of 4.9 meters (16 ft 1 in). The boats had a diving depth of 60 m (200 ft) and a complement of 60 officers and crewmen.

For surface running, the boats were powered by two 3,400-brake-horsepower (2,535 kW) diesel engines, each driving one propeller shaft. When submerged each propeller was driven by a 900-horsepower (671 kW) electric motor. They could reach 20 knots (37 km/h; 23 mph) on the surface and 8 knots (15 km/h; 9.2 mph) underwater. On the surface, the KD3Bs had a range of 10,000 nautical miles (19,000 km; 12,000 mi) at 10 knots (19 km/h; 12 mph); submerged, they had a range of 90 nmi (170 km; 100 mi) at 3 knots (5.6 km/h; 3.5 mph).

The boats were armed with eight internal 53.3 cm (21.0 in) torpedo tubes, six in the bow and two in the stern. They carried one reload for each tube; a total of 16 torpedoes. They were also armed with one 120 mm (4.7 in) deck gun.

== Construction and commissioning ==
I-63 was built by the Sasebo Naval Arsenal at Sasebo, Japan. Her keel was laid on 12 August 1926 and she was launched on 28 September 1927. She was completed and commissioned on 20 December 1928.

== Service history ==
=== 1928–1938 ===
Upon commissioning, I-63 was assigned to Submarine Division 28, in which she spent her entire career. The division was assigned to the Sasebo Naval District on 24 December 1929, then was reassigned to Submarine Squadron 2 in the 2nd Fleet in the Combined Fleet on 1 December 1930, to Submarine Squadron 1 in the 1st Fleet in the Combined Fleet on 1 December 1932, and to the Sasebo Defense Division in the Sasebo Naval District on 15 November 1933. On 20 March 1934, I-63 was decommissioned and placed in reserve, and while she was in reserve Submarine Division 28 was reassigned to the Sasebo Guard Squadron on 11 December 1933.

Submarine Division 28 again was assigned to Submarine Squadron 2 in the 2nd Fleet on 15 November 1934, and I-63 was recommissioned that day. On 7 February 1935 I-63 got underway from Sasebo along with the other five submarines of Submarine Squadron 2 — I-53, I-54 and I-55 of Submarine Division 18 and Submarine Division 28′s I-59 and I-60 — for a training cruise in the Kuril Islands. The cruise concluded with their arrival at Sukumo Bay on 25 February 1935. The six submarines got back underway from Sasebo on 29 March 1935 for a training cruise in Chinese waters and returned to Sasebo on 4 April 1935. On 15 November 1935, Submarine Division 28 again was assigned to Submarine Squadron 1 in the 1st Fleet.

On 27 March 1937, I-63 put to sea from Sasebo with I-59 and I-60 for a training cruise in the vicinity of Qingdao, China. The three submarines concluded it with their arrival at Ariake Bay on 6 April 1937. Submarine Division 28 was reassigned to the Sasebo Defense Squadron in the Sasebo Naval District on 1 December 1937 and then to Submarine Squadron 1 in the 1st Fleet on 15 December 1938.

=== Loss ===
In January 1939, I-63 and the other submarines of Submarine Squadron 1 got underway for fleet exercises. Early on the morning of 2 February 1939, the submarines were on their way to their assigned stations for a simulated attack against Japanese surface ships also taking part in the exercises. I-63 arrived at her station in the Bungo Strait off Kyushu about 60 nautical miles (110 km; 69 mi) northwest of Mizunokojima Lighthouse and at 04:30 shut down her diesel engines and hove-to to await sunrise on the surface with all of her running lights on.

I-60, proceeding on the surface at 12 knots (22 km/h; 14 mph) toward her own assigned station, mistakenly entered I-63′s assigned area due to a navigation error. At around 05:00 I-60′s watch officer sighted two white lights belonging to I-63. I-60′s lookouts misidentified I-63′s lights as those of two fishing boats in close proximity to one another. I-60′s watch officer decided to pass between the supposed fishing boats, unwittingly putting I-60 on a collision course with I-63. By the time I-60′s watch officer realized the lights belonged to I-63, the two submarines were only 220 yards (200 m) apart. He ordered I-60 to turn in the hope of avoiding a collision. Meanwhile, I-63′s crew called her commanding officer to her bridge, which he reached in time to see that I-60 was about to ram his submarine. He issued a command for I-63 to go to all ahead full and ordered her crew to close all watertight doors.

By the time the two submarines sighted each other, it was too late to avoid a collision, and I-60 rammed I-63. The impact tore open I-63′s starboard ballast tank and auxiliary machinery compartment. I-63 sank in a few minutes in 320 feet (98 m) of water with the loss of 81 members of her crew. I-60, which had suffered a crushed bow buoyancy tank, rescued I-63′s commanding officer and six other crewmen. They were I-63′s only survivors.

As the result of the post-accident investigation, a court of inquiry found that I-60′s navigation error had contributed to the accident and that I-60 had unsatisfactory lookout procedures and inadequate management of her watch officers. Although off the bridge and below at the time of the collision, I-60′s commanding officer took full responsibility for the accident. After a trial by court-martial, he was suspended from duty, and his later promotion from lieutenant commander to commander was delayed.

== Disposal ==
Pending salvage, I-63 was reassigned for administrative purposes to the Fourth Reserve in the Sasebo Naval District, effective on the date she sank. Her wreck was salvaged in January 1940 and scrapped in Kure. She was stricken from the Navy list on 1 June 1940.
