= Mizunokojima Lighthouse =

Mizunokojima Lighthouse Mizunoko Sima 水ノ子島灯台
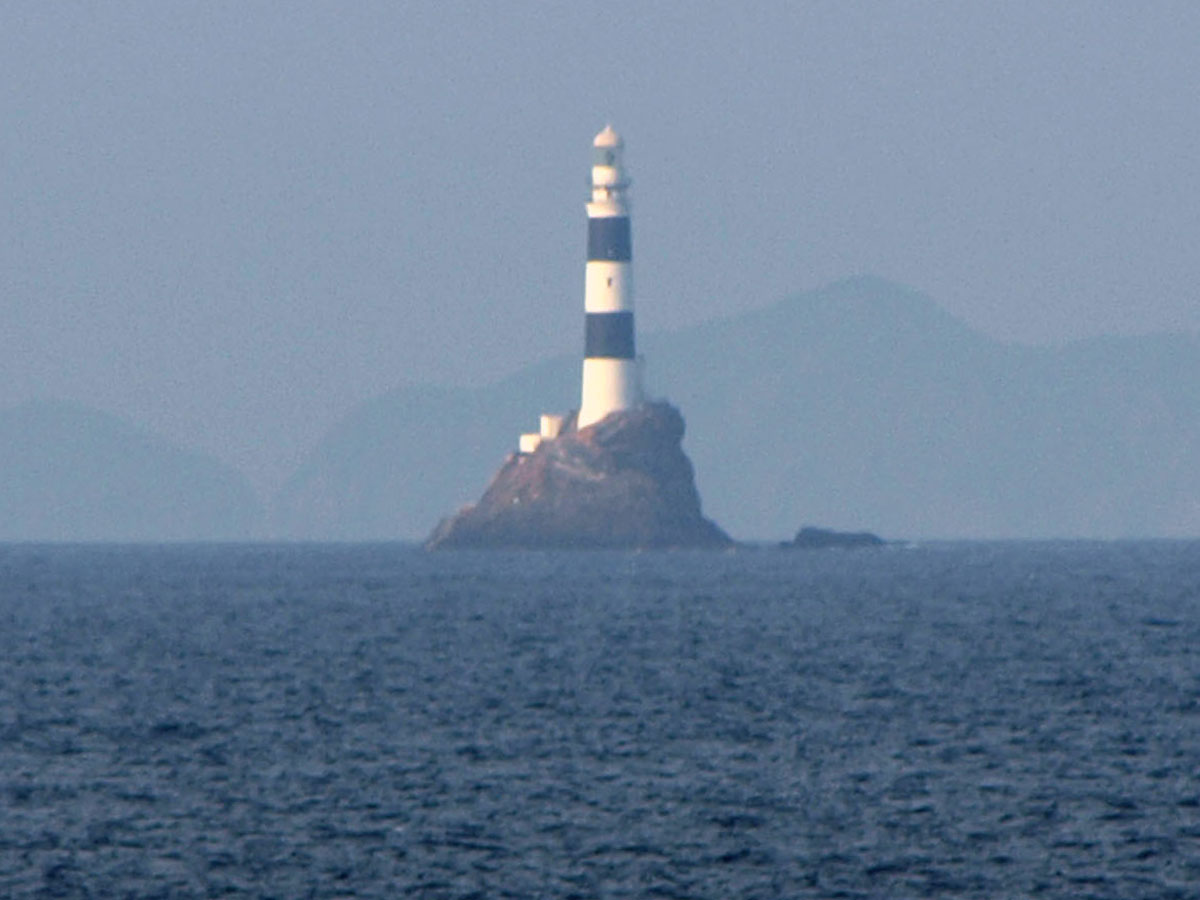
- Mizunokojima Lighthouse seen in May 2009
- Location: Bungo Channel; Japan
- Coordinates: 33°02′37.8″N 132°10′36.3″E

Tower
- Constructed: 1904
- Construction: stone tower
- Automated: 1986
- Height: 39.25 metres (128.8 ft)
- Shape: cylindrical tower with balcony and lantern
- Markings: white and black bands tower, white lantern
- Power source: solar power
- Operator: Japan Coast Guard

Light
- First lit: 20 March 1904
- Focal height: 56.3 metres (185 ft)
- Intensity: 1,200,000 cd
- Range: 20 nautical miles (37 km; 23 mi)
- Characteristic: Fl W 10s.
- Japan no.: JCG-5701

Mizunokojima Lighthouse (水ノ子島灯台, Mizunokojima Tōdai) is an active lighthouse located in Japan's Bungo Channel.

== Specifications ==
The structure is located on Mizunokojima, a small rocky island roughly 25 kilometres (16 mi) east-northeast of the city of Saiki, in the middle of the Bungo Channel. The light itself is 56 metres (184 ft) above sea level, while the building is 36 metres (118 ft) off the ground; the height of the island makes up the difference. It is one of Japan's tallest lighthouses. The tower is painted in alternating black and white horizontal stripes. The light flashes once every ten seconds and emits 1,200,000 candela. The white two-story keeper's house is located directly next to the light.

== History ==
The Mizunokojima Lighthouse began operating on 20 March 1904, after a torturous four-year construction marked by difficulties brought on by the remoteness of the location. The location had to be abandoned on 4 May 1945 during World War II due to Allied strafing and bombs, but service was restored with acetylene gas lamps by 17 May 1946. On 15 November 1950, the normal light was finally repaired. The lighthouse was staffed until 1986, when it transitioned to automatic control. Solar and wave power generators were installed in 2002.

Several typhoons have hit the lighthouse in its years of operation, and the resulting high waves have caused damage. Keepers' records show that waves taller than the roof of the lighthouse hit on 22 September 1922. Another typhoon on 1 October 1941 created waves that reached up to the seventh floor of the lighthouse, rendering equipment like meteorological instruments, radio equipment, generators, and batteries unusable, and the storm destroyed the adjoining pier.

== See also ==
- List of lighthouses in Japan
