= USCGC Matagorda =

USCGC Matagorda has been the name of more than one United States Coast Guard ship, and may refer to:

- USCGC Matagorda (WAVP-373), later WHEC-373, a cutter in commission from 1949 to 1967
- USCGC Matagorda (WPB-1303), a patrol boat decommissioned after a failed Deepwater re-fit
