= YO-160 =

American marine vessel

The YO-160 was built in 1943 by the Concrete Ship Constructors of National City, California for the Maritime Commission. It was in active service as a fuel oil barge in the Pacific before being used as a part of the nuclear weapon testing of Operation Crossroads at Bikini Atoll. It was 375 feet long with a displacement of 10,960 tons.

== Test Able ==
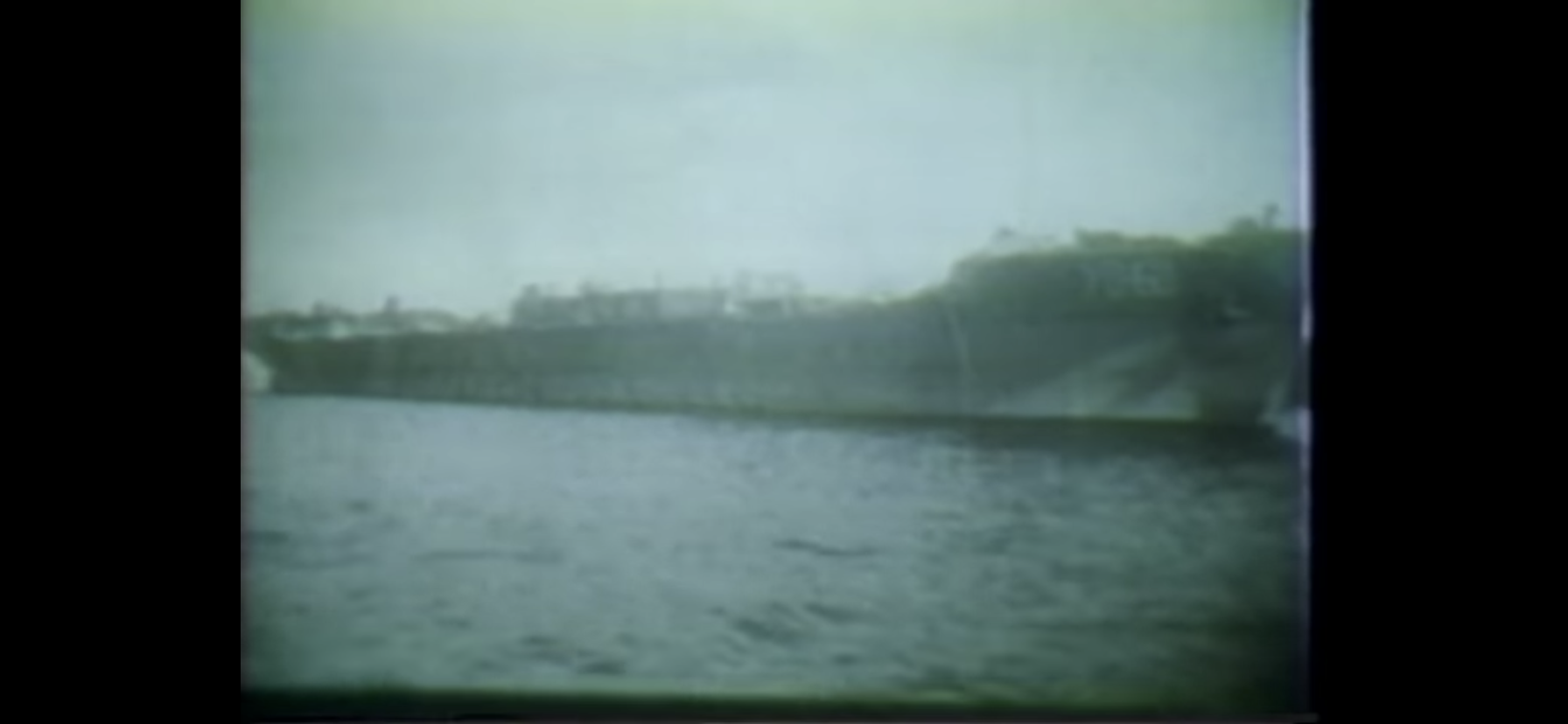
Y0-160, with superstructure collapsed, after atomic test Able, 1946.

Test A (Test Able) was performed on July 1, 1946. The barge endured an overpressure of 40 PSI at 540 yards from the blast. Inspection revealed the barge sustained only superficial damage with scaling on the main deck due to an intense fire that burned after the initial blast. On July 2 it was towed out of the target array and secured to a spare mooring buoy in the lagoon between Enyo and Bikini Islands. July 4th inspection indicated the barge was radioactive but at levels that allowed for on-board exposure of up to five hours at a time. A day later, the exposure limit increased to 12 hours. Structures above the main deck were completely demolished by the blast. During the move to the test Baker area, a camel between USS Arkansas (BB-33) and the barge punched a hole in the barge just below the waterline and the barge suffered flooding. It was placed and readied for test Baker on July 20, 1946.

== Test Baker ==
Test B (Test Baker) was performed on July 25, 1946. The YO-160 sank immediately after the blast primarily due to the hole punched into it before the test. The sinking was documented by tower camera pictures. The only significant damage recorded based on the pictures was fracturing near the previous damage which caused the barge to sink.
