= USS Crittenden =

United States naval vessel (1945–1948)

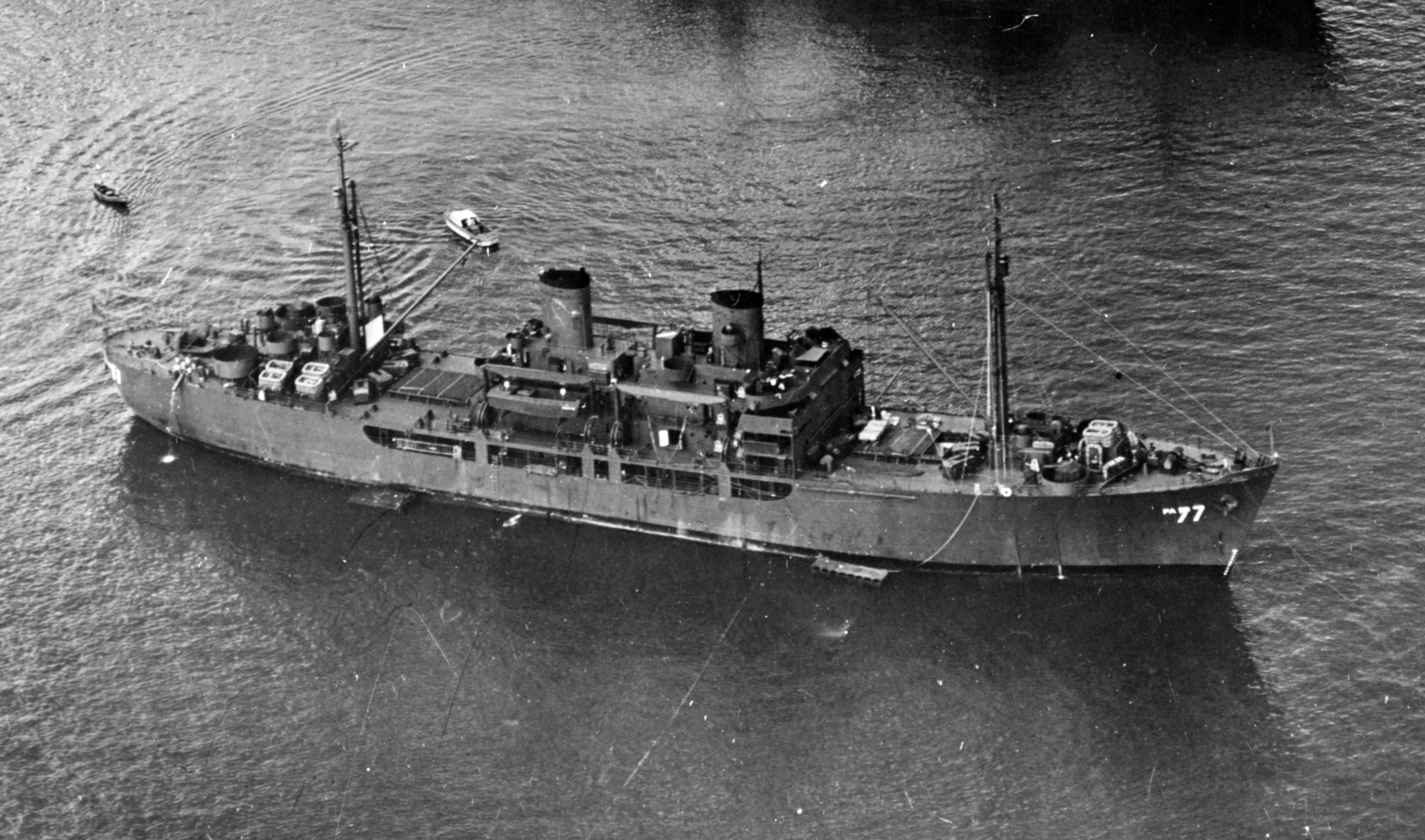
- Crittenden in February 1946

History

United States
- Name: USS Crittenden (APA-77)
- Namesake: Crittenden County, Arkansas; Crittenden County, Kentucky
- Builder: Consolidated Steel
- Launched: 6 November 1944
- Sponsored by: Mrs. W.R. Boyd
- Acquired: 16 January 1944
- Commissioned: 17 January 1945
- Decommissioned: 28 August 1946
- Fate: Scuttled after an explosives test, 5 October 1948

General characteristics
- Class & type: Gilliam-class attack transport
- Displacement: 4,247 tons (lt), 7,080 t.(fl)
- Length: 426 ft (130 m)
- Beam: 58 ft (18 m)
- Draft: 16 ft (4.9 m)
- Propulsion: Westinghouse turboelectric drive, 2 boilers, 2 propellers, Design shaft horsepower 6,000
- Speed: 17 knots
- Capacity: 47 Officers, 802 Enlisted
- Crew: 27 Officers, 295 Enlisted
- Armament: 1 x 5"/38 caliber dual-purpose gun mount, 4 x twin 40mm gun mounts, 10 x single 20mm gun mounts
- Notes: MCV Hull No. ?, hull type S4-SE2-BD1

USS Crittenden (APA-77) was a Gilliam-class attack transport that served with the United States Navy from 1945 to 1946. She was sunk as a target in 1948.

== History ==
Crittenden was named after counties in Arkansas and Kentucky. Crittenden (APA-77) was launched 6 November 1944 by Consolidated Steel at Wilmington, California, under a Maritime Commission contract; transferred to the Navy 16 January 1945; and commissioned the next day.

Sailing from San Diego 14 March 1945, Crittenden conducted training at Pearl Harbor until 24 May, then loaded troops and cargo at San Francisco for Okinawa, arriving 5 August. She survived a typhoon which struck the island.

=== After hostilities ===
She sailed 23 August for Manila, arriving 27 August, and from 15 September to 21 October carried occupation troops from Leyte to Wakayama and Mitsuyama, Japan, then returned to Okinawa 27 October. Assigned to Operation Magic Carpet, she made two voyages from Okinawa and Samar to San Francisco between 10 November 1945 and 24 January 1946.

=== Operation Crossroads ===
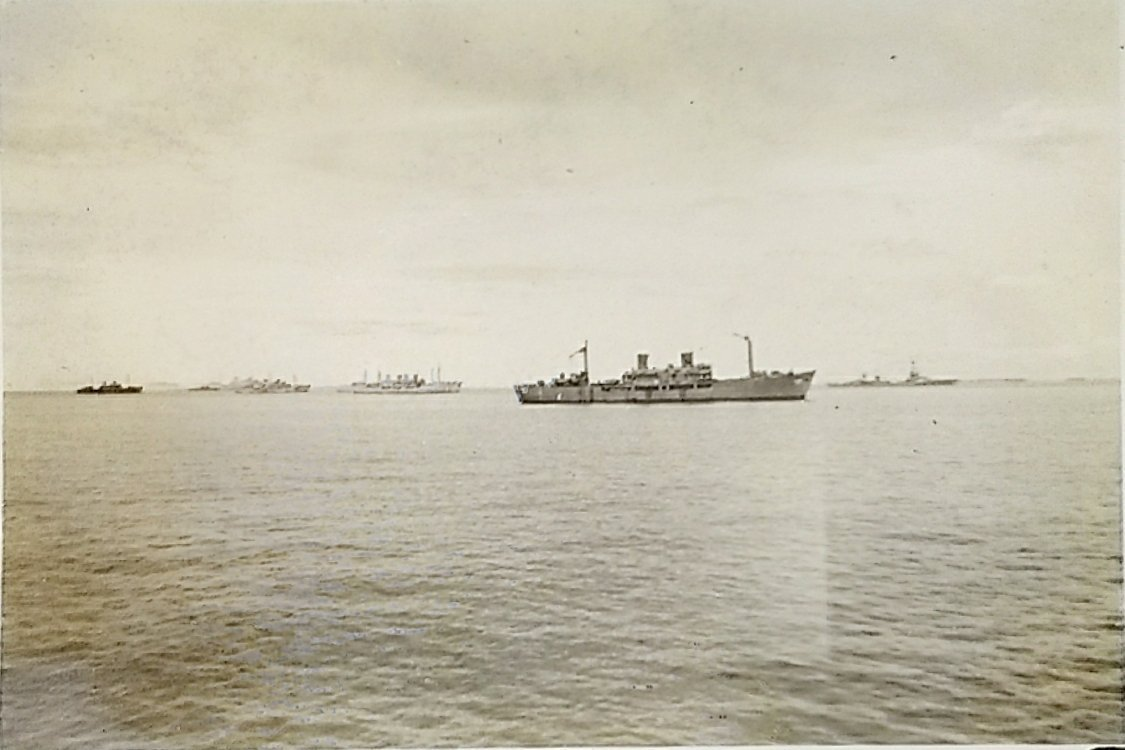
During Operation Crossroads

Crittenden put out from San Pedro 16 February 1946 to join JTF-1 for Operation Crossroads, the atomic bomb tests at Bikini Atoll. She was taken to Kwajalein 27 August 1946 and decommissioned the next day. She suffered radiation and shock wave damage from the test.

After study, she was towed back to San Francisco on 1 January 1947 and sunk in an explosives test off the Farallone Islands on 5 October 1948. Her wreck became a fisheries habitat.
