= USS LSM-60 =

LSM-1-class landing ship medium

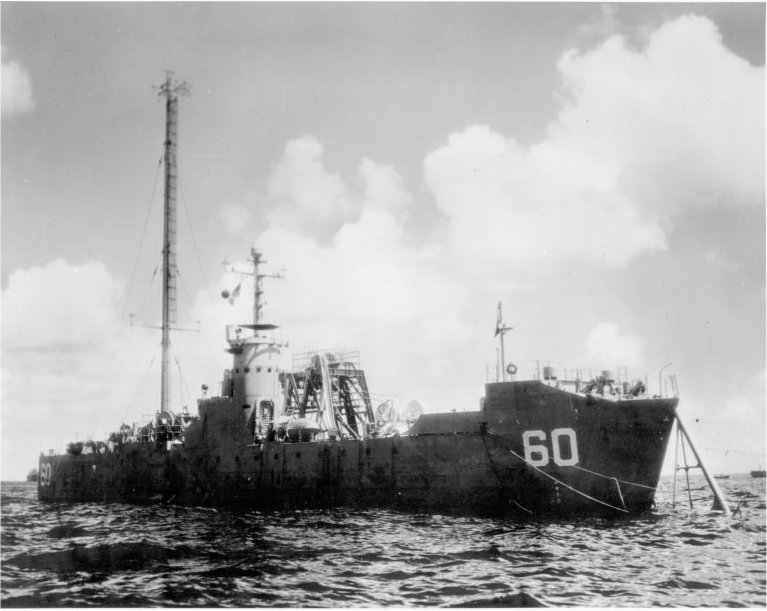
- LSM-60 with modifications for the Baker Test, Bikini Atoll

History

United States
- Name: USS LSM-60
- Builder: Brown Shipbuilding, Houston, Texas
- Laid down: 7 July 1944
- Launched: 29 July 1944
- Commissioned: 25 August 1944
- Honors and awards: 1 battle star (World War II)
- Fate: Destroyed during "Operation Crossroads" Test Baker, 25 July 1946

General characteristics
- Class & type: LSM-1 class Landing Ship Medium
- Displacement: 520 long tons (528 t) light; 743 long tons (755 t) landing; 1,095 long tons (1,113 t) full load
- Length: 203 ft 6 in (62.03 m) o/a
- Beam: 34 ft 6 in (10.52 m)
- Draft: 3 ft 6 in (1.07 m) forward; 7 ft 8 in (2.34 m) aft; Fully loaded : 6 ft 4 in (1.93 m) forward; 8 ft 3 in (2.51 m) aft
- Propulsion: 2 × Fairbanks-Morse (model 38D81/8X10, reversible with hydraulic clutch) diesels. Direct drive with 1,440 bhp (1,074 kW) each @ 720 rpm, twin screws
- Speed: 13.2 knots (15.2 mph; 24.4 km/h)
- Range: 4,900 nmi (9,100 km) at 12 kn (22 km/h)
- Capacity: 5 medium or 3 heavy tanks, or 6 LVT's, or 9 DUKW's
- Troops: 2 officers, 46 enlisted
- Complement: 5 officers, 54 enlisted
- Armament: 6 × 20 mm AA gun mounts
- Armour: 10-lb. STS splinter shield to gun mounts, pilot house and conning station

USS LSM-60 was a World War II era landing ship, medium (LSM) amphibious assault ship of the United States Navy. It was notable for being used as the float to suspend a fission bomb underwater during the Operation Crossroads BAKER test, becoming the first naval vessel to deploy a nuclear weapon.

== World War II Service ==
LSM-60's keel was laid on 7 July 1944 and it was launched on 29 July. It was commissioned on 25 August.

LSM-60 participated in the assault landings at Iwo Jima, where it earned one battle star.

== Operation Crossroads "ground" zero ==
LSM-60 is destroyed as part of the Operation Crossroads BAKER test

In 1946, the United States conducted the first nuclear weapon tests designed to measure nuclear explosion effects on ships, Operation Crossroads. The second shot of this test, BAKER, was designed to test the effects of an underwater nuclear blast on surface ships and submarines.

LSM-60 was modified with a well through the cargo deck and hull, a derrick to lower the bomb through the well, and a large antenna to receive the detonation signal. On 25 July, a standard Mk. 3A "Fat Man" type atomic bomb, nicknamed Helen of Bikini, placed in a watertight casing, was suspended 90 feet below LSM-60 in the lagoon of Bikini Atoll in the Marshall Islands. At 0835 local time the bomb was detonated, destroying LSM-60 and sinking eight target ships, including USS Saratoga (CV-3). A seaman present claimed that "there was not one identifiable piece of the LSM-60 ever located", however a British naval constructor present reports he saw a 3-inch (7.6 cm) square piece of LSM-60 on the deck of a target ship afterward.
