= Japanese submarine I-369 =

History

Japan
- Name: Submarine No. 5469
- Builder: Yokosuka Navy Yard, Yokosuka, Japan
- Laid down: 1 September 1943
- Renamed: I-369 on 25 January 1944
- Launched: 9 March 1944
- Completed: 9 October 1944
- Commissioned: 9 October 1944
- Fate: Surrendered 30 August 1945; Stricken 15 September 1945; Scrapped 1946

General characteristics
- Class & type: Type D1 submarine
- Displacement: 1,440 long tons (1,463 t) surfaced; 2,215 long tons (2,251 t) submerged
- Length: 73.50 m (241 ft 2 in) overall
- Beam: 8.90 m (29 ft 2 in)
- Draft: 4.76 m (15 ft 7 in)
- Propulsion: 2 × Kampon Mk.23B Model 8 diesels; 1,850 bhp surfaced; 1,200 shp submerged; 2 shafts
- Speed: 13.0 knots (24.1 km/h) surfaced; 6.5 knots (12.0 km/h) submerged
- Range: 15,000 nmi (28,000 km) at 10 knots (19 km/h) surfaced; 120 nmi (220 km) at 3 knots (5.6 km/h) submerged
- Test depth: 75 m (246 ft)
- Boats & landing craft carried: 2 x Daihatsu-class landing craft
- Capacity: 85 tons freight (until May 1945); 100 tons aviation gasoline (planned; conversion not completed as of August 1945)
- Complement: 55
- Sensors & processing systems: 1 × Type 22 surface search radar; 1 × Type 13 early warning radar
- Armament: 1 × 14 cm/40 11th Year Type naval gun; 2 × Type 96 25mm AA guns

I-369 was an Imperial Japanese Navy Type D1 transport submarine. Completed and commissioned in October 1944, she served in World War II and conducted transport missions between Japan and outlying islands. The last Japanese transport submarine to visit the Japanese base at Truk, she surrendered at the end of the war and was scrapped in 1946.

== Construction and commissioning ==
I-369 was laid down on 1 September 1943 by the Yokosuka Navy Yard at Yokosuka, Japan, with the name Submarine No. 5469. She was renamed I-369 on 25 January 1944 and provisionally attached to the Sasebo Naval District that day. She was launched on 9 March 1944 and completed and commissioned on 9 October 1944.

== Service history ==
Upon commissioning, I-369 was attached formally to the Yokosuka Naval District and was assigned to Submarine Squadron 11 for workups. With her workups complete, she was reassigned to Submarine Squadron 7 on 15 December 1944.

On 21 January 1945, I-369 departed Yokosuka bound for Marcus Island on her first transport mission. She arrived at Marcus on 28 January 1945, unloaded her cargo, and got back underway to return to Yokosuka, which she reached on 5 February 1945. She again left Yokosuka on 12 February for her second supply voyage. After delivering her cargo at Chichijima in the Bonin Islands, she returned to Yokosuka on 21 February 1945. On 20 March 1945, Submarine Squadron 7 was deactivated, and I-369 was reassigned to Submarine Division 16 along with the submarines I-372, Ha-101, Ha-102, and Ha-104.

I-369 got underway from Yokosuka on 16 April for her third and final transport voyage, this time setting course for Truk and Mereyon Island at Woleai in the Caroline Islands. The last Japanese transport submarine to visit Truk, she arrived there on 1 May 1945 and unloaded 0.312 metric tons of food, 6.303 metric tons of weapons and ammunition, 25 metric tons of fuel, and 4.4 metric tons of other cargo. Departing Truk on 3 May 1945, she proceeded to Mereyon, where she arrived after dark on 7 May 1945 and unloaded 38.9 metric tons of food and 2.6 metric tons of other cargo. She also embarked two boxes of the cremated remains of deceased Japanese military personnel and 60 passengers, including the surviving crew members of an 801st Naval Air Group Kawanishi H8K (Allied reporting name "Emily") flying boat which had landed there after serving as a pathfinder aircraft for Operation Tan No. 2, an 11 March 1945 Japanese kamikaze attack against the American fleet anchorage at Ulithi Atoll. She departed Mereyon on 11 May 1945 and completed her voyage with her arrival at Yokosuka on 24 May 1945.

On 25 May 1945, I-369 began conversion at Yokosuka into a tanker submarine capable of carrying 100 metric ton of aviation gasoline. She was still under conversion and in a partially dismantled state when hostilities between Japan and the Allies ended on 15 August 1945. She surrendered to the Allies on 30 August 1945.

== Disposal ==
The Japanese struck I-369 from the Navy list on 15 September 1945. She was scrapped at Yokosuka in 1946.

== Sources ==
- Hackett, Bob & Kingsepp, Sander. IJN Submarine I-369: Tabular Record of Movement. Retrieved on September 19, 2020.
