= Japanese submarine I-372 =

1944 Type D2 submarine

History

Japan
- Name: Submarine No. 2961
- Builder: Yokosuka Naval Arsenal, Yokosuka, Japan
- Laid down: 10 February 1944
- Launched: 26 June 1944
- Renamed: I-372 on 26 June 1944
- Completed: 8 November 1944
- Commissioned: 8 November 1944
- Fate: Sunk 18 July 1945; Stricken 15 September 1945; Refloated August 1946; Scuttled August 1946

General characteristics
- Class & type: Type D1 submarine
- Displacement: 1,440 long tons (1,463 t) surfaced; 2,215 long tons (2,251 t) submerged
- Length: 73.50 m (241 ft 2 in) overall
- Beam: 8.90 m (29 ft 2 in)
- Draft: 4.76 m (15 ft 7 in)
- Propulsion: 2 × Kampon Mk.23B Model 8 diesels; 1,850 bhp surfaced; 1,200 shp submerged; 2 shafts
- Speed: 13.0 knots (24.1 km/h) surfaced; 6.5 knots (12.0 km/h) submerged
- Range: 15,000 nmi (28,000 km) at 10 knots (19 km/h) surfaced; 120 nmi (220 km) at 3 knots (5.6 km/h) submerged
- Test depth: 75 m (246 ft)
- Boats & landing craft carried: 2 x Daihatsu-class landing craft
- Capacity: 85 tons freight (until February 1945); 90 tons aviation gasoline (from March 1945)
- Complement: 55
- Sensors & processing systems: 1 × Type 22 surface search radar; 1 × Type 13 early warning radar
- Armament: 1 × 14 cm L/40 naval gun; 2 × Type 96 25mm AA guns

I-372 was an Imperial Japanese Navy Type D1 transport submarine. Completed and commissioned in November 1944, she served in World War II and was sunk in July 1945.

== Construction and commissioning ==
I-372 was laid down on 10 February 1944 by the Yokosuka Naval Arsenal at Yokosuka, Japan, with the name Submarine No. 2961. She was launched on 26 June 1944 and renamed I-372 that day. She was completed and commissioned on 8 November 1944.

== Service history ==
Upon commissioning, I-372 was attached to the Sasebo Naval District and was assigned to Submarine Squadron 11 for workups. She was reassigned to Submarine Squadron 7 on 8 January 1945.

=== Transport operations ===
On 8 February 1945, I-372 departed Yokosuka bound for Takao on Formosa. She was then to rescue Imperial Japanese Army Air Force pilots stranded at Batulinao in the Aparri area of northern Luzon in the Philippine Islands as a result of Japanese setbacks in the Philippines campaign, but after the submarines Ro-112 and Ro-113 were lost attempting to pick up the pilots, she received orders to abort the mission and return to Japan. She arrived at Kure on 14 February 1945.

The Japanese next considered sending I-372 to Iwo Jima with a cargo of artillery shells, but abandoned the idea. Instead, on 16 February 1945 I-372 began conversion at the Kure Naval Arsenal into a tanker submarine capable of carrying 90 metric tons of aviation gasoline. During her conversion, she probably also had a submarine snorkel installed. In mid-March 1945 she moved to Yokosuka, and on 20 March 1945 Submarine Squadron 7 was deactivated and she was reassigned to Submarine Division 16 along with the submarines I-369, Ha-101, Ha-102, and Ha-104.

On 1 April 1945, I-372 departed Yokosuka on a supply voyage to Wake Island. On 4 April 1945, Fleet Radio Unit, Melbourne (FRUMEL), an Allied signals intelligence unit headquartered at Melbourne, Australia, reported that it had intercepted and decrypted Japanese signal traffic indicating that a Japanese submarine would arrive at Wake Island on 17 April 1945 and begin several nights of unloading and loading operations there. The United States Navy submarine USS Sea Owl (SS-405) was alerted to this at 04:00 on 16 April 1945 via an Ultra intelligence signal from Guam and moved to intercept the Japanese submarine.

On 18 April 1945, Sea Owl detected I-372 on radar 7 nautical miles (13 km; 8.1 mi) northwest of Wake. I-372′s radar detector failed to detect Sea Owl′s radar signal, and I-372 anchored at Wake without her crew realizing that any Allied forces were in the area. Sea Owl approached the anchorage and fired three torpedoes at I-372 at a range of 1,600 yards (1,500 m). Two of them failed to detonate, and the third missed I-372 but destroyed Wake Island's pier. I-372 crash-dived, and after World War II the U.S. Joint Army-Navy Assessment Committee erroneously credited Sea Owl with sinking the submarine Ro-56 that day.

I-372 did not surface again until 19 April 1945, when she finished unloading her cargo — which included enough rice to feed Wake Island's garrison for ten days — and embarked 29 passengers. She then got underway for Yokosuka, which she reached on 29 April 1945.

I-372′s next supply run also was to Wake Island. She departed Yokosuka on 15 June 1945, and FRUMEL again detected her movements, reporting that day that "A Japanese submarine left Tokyo Bay at 09:00 on 15th [June 1944] to pass 5 nautical miles (9.3 km; 5.8 mi) south of Nojima Saki at 20:00 on passage to Wake Island." She avoided interception by Allied forces, however, and arrived at Wake on 28 June 1945, unloaded her cargo, and headed back to Yokosuka, where she arrived on 10 July 1945.

=== Loss ===
During an air raid on Yokosuka by U.S. Navy Task Force 38 aircraft on 18 July 1945, I-372 came under attack by TBM Avenger torpedo bombers and F6F Hellcat fighters from the aircraft carriers USS Essex (CV-9), USS Randolph (CV-15), USS Shangri-La (CV-38), and USS Belleau Wood (CVL-24). The attack killed one member of her crew, and a bomb that landed close aboard ruptured her starboard cargo hold. She slowly sank. Deemed beyond salvage, she was abandoned.

== Final disposition ==
Hostilities between Japan and the Allies came to an end on 15 August 1945, and in September 1945 U.S. Navy divers from the submarine tender USS Proteus (AS-19) inspected I-372′s wreck. The Japanese struck her from the Navy list on 15 September 1945. In August 1946 the wreck was refloated, towed into deep water, and scuttled.

== Sources ==
- Hackett, Bob & Kingsepp, Sander. IJN Submarine I-372: Tabular Record of Movement. Retrieved on September 19, 2020.
