= Ha-102 =

Ha-102 may refer to:

- Japanese submarine Ha-102, an Imperial Japanese Navy submarine in commission from 1944 to 1945
- Mitsubishi Ha102, an alternative name for the Mitsubishi Zuisei aircraft engine
