= Ha-101 =

Ha-101 may refer to:

- Ha-101-class submarine, a class of Imperial Japanese Navy transport submarines constructed during World War II
- Japanese submarine Ha-101, an Imperial Japanese Navy submarine in commission from 1944 to 1945
