= USS Horace A. Bass =

1944 Crosley-class high speed transport

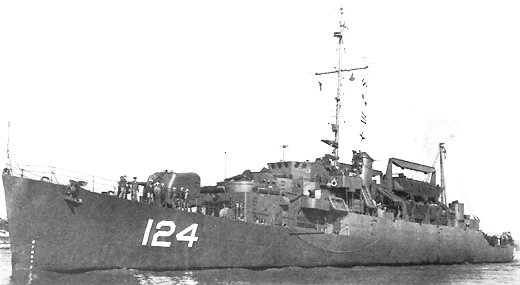
- USS Horace A. Bass (APD-124)

History

United States
- Name: USS Horace A. Bass
- Namesake: Ensign Horace A. Bass Jr. (1915–1942), United States Navy aviator and recipient of the Navy Cross
- Builder: Bethlehem Steel Company, Fore River, Quincy, Massachusetts
- Laid down: 3 August 1944
- Launched: 12 September 1944
- Sponsored by: Mrs. Horace A. Bass, Jr.
- Commissioned: 21 December 1944
- Decommissioned: 9 February 1959
- Recommissioned: Unrecorded date
- Decommissioned: 30 July 1969
- Reclassified: From destroyer escort DE-691 to high-speed transport APD-124 prior to construction; From APD-124 to amphibious transport, small, LPR-124 1 January 1969
- Stricken: 15 September 1974
- Honors and awards: Two battle stars for World War II service; A Navy Unit Commendation and five battle stars for Korean War service
- Fate: Sold for scrapping 11 August 1975

General characteristics
- Class & type: Crosley-class high-speed transport
- Displacement: 1,650 tons
- Length: 306 ft 0 in (93.27 m)
- Beam: 37 ft 0 in (11.28 m)
- Draft: 12 ft 7 in (3.84 m)
- Installed power: 12,000 shaft horsepower (8.96 MW)
- Propulsion: 2 Combustion Engineering DR boilers, 2 General Electric turbines, turbo-electric drive, 2 shafts
- Speed: 23.6 knots maximum; 12 knots economical cruising
- Range: 6,000 nautical miles (11,112 kilometers) at 12 knots
- Boats & landing craft carried: 4 x landing craft vehicle and personnel (LCVP)s
- Capacity: 6 × quarter-ton trucks; 2 × 1-ton trucks; 4 × ammunition carts; 4 × pack howitzers<Ammunition 6,000 cubic feet; General cargo 3,500 cubic feet; Gasoline 1,000 cubic feet
- Troops: 162
- Complement: 204
- Armament: 1 × 5 in (130 mm) gun; 3 × twin 40 mm antiaircraft guns; 6 × single 20 mm antiaircraft guns; 2 × depth charge racks

USS Horace A. Bass (DE-691/APD-124/LPR-124) was a United States Navy high-speed transport in commission from 1944 to 1969.

== Namesake ==
Horace Ancel Bass Jr. was born on 22 September 1915 in Roanoke, Virginia. He enlisted in the U.S. Navy on 24 February 1941. In May 1941 he was designated an "aviation cadet" and after aviation training was appointed ensign on 5 December 1941. He underwent further flight training and reported to the aircraft carrier USS Saratoga in early 1942. Bass was assigned to the aircraft carrier USS Yorktown during the pivotal Battle of Midway. He flew as part of the combat air patrol on 4 June 1942. During the battle, he shot down an attacking Japanese dive bomber and a fighter. For his part in the battle Bass was awarded the Navy Cross. Assigned to Fighter Squadron 5 on the USS Saratoga, Bass flew combat air patrol during the Battle of the Eastern Solomons during which he was shot down and reported missing in action on 24 August 1942.

== Construction and commissioning ==
Originally projected as a Rudderow-class destroyer escort (DE-691), Horace A. Bass (APD-124) was selected for completion to a modified design as a Crosley Class High-speed Transport (APD), designed for landing and supporting raiding parties while retaining a secondary, destroyer escort-like role of convoy escort. Laid down on 3 August 1944 at Quincy, Massachusetts, by the Bethlehem Steel Company, Fore River, she was launched on 12 September 1944, sponsored by Mrs. Horace A. Bass Jr., widow of Ensign Horace A. Bass Jr., and commissioned on 21 December 1944.

== World War II service 1944-1945 ==
Horace A. Bass fitted out at the Boston Navy Yard, Boston, Massachusetts, and conducted shakedown training off Bermuda, after which she sailed to New York City, where she arrived 15 February 1945. Departing on 16 February 1945, Horace A. Bass escorted ammunition ship USS Firedrake (AE-14) to Panama, from where she proceeded to San Diego, California, arriving on 3 March 1945. After gunnery exercises in the area she sailed westward to join in the climactic phase of World War II.

Horace A. Bass stopped at Pearl Harbor, Hawaii; Eniwetok; and Ulithi Atoll, en route Okinawa, where the largest fleet assembled in the Pacific was supporting United States Army and United States Marine Corps forces in what was to be the final major land battle of the war against Japan. She arrived off Okinawa on 6 April 1945, just in time to take part in repelling one of the fiercest Japanese air assaults of the campaign. As the desperate attack was driven off, Horace A. Bass was credited with at least one plane shot down. As the battle raged ashore, she served on the vital picket line to warn of incoming Japanese air raids until 10 April 1945, when she sailed with a convoy to Guam. On the return passage she sank the Japanese submarine Ro-109 with a single accurate depth charge attack south of Okinawa on 25 April 1945.

Arriving at Okinawa on 26 April 1945, Horace A. Bass resumed the hectic picket duty interspersed with convoy voyages to Saipan and Guam. Though Okinawa was secured in mid-June 1945, Japanese air attacks continued, and Horace A. Bass continued to provide antiaircraft and antisubmarine protection to the many ships off Okinawa. Early on 30 July 1945, she was on picket duty in the area when a low-flying kamikaze suicide aircraft crashed through her superstructure and fell alongside, its bomb exploding close aboard. Horace A. Bass suffered hull damage and 14 casualties, but was quickly repaired. She remained off Okinawa until sailing north toward Japan on 14 August 1945.

Horace A. Bass received two battle stars for World War II service, for:

- Okinawa Gunto Operation: Assault and Occupation of Okinawa Gunto 6 April 1945 to 10 April 1945 and 25 April 1945 to 30 June 1945
- Third Fleet Operations Against Japan 10 July 1945 to 15 August 1945

== Peacetime service, 1945-1950 ==
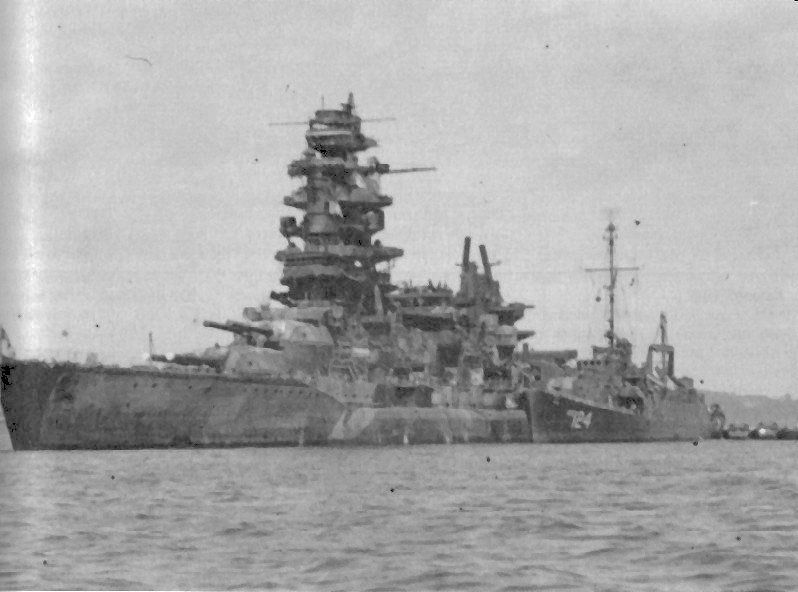
Horace A. Bass alongside Japanese battleship Nagato immediately after World War II.

After the end of hostilities with Japan on 15 August 1945, Horace A. Bass remained off Japan with United States Third Fleet units until the ships triumphantly entered Tokyo Bay on 27 August 1945. Horace A. Bass took part in 'the occupation of the giant Yokosuka Naval Base, furnishing the prize crew which took possession of battleship Nagato, one of the very few major ships left to the Imperial Japanese Navy. Horace A. Bass remained at Yokosuka assisting in the occupation until sailing for the United States on 14 January 1946.

Horace A. Bass arrived at San Francisco, California, on 7 February 1946. She was in overhaul at the Mare Island Navy Yard, Vallejo, California, from 11 February 1946 to 10 April 1946, then spent the remainder of 1946 in the San Diego area on training operations. She sailed again for the Far East on 27 January 1947, this time to support American efforts to stabilize the volatile situation in China due to the civil war there. Arriving at Qingdao, China, on 5 March 1947, Horace A. Bass acted as a station ship until sailing again for San Diego on 30 July 1947. She spent the second half of 1947 on training exercises in California waters, and in early 1948 she operated off the coast of Mexico. She proceeded to China again on 16 June 1948, and again served as station ship at Hong Kong and Qingdao, occasionally sailing to the Marshall Islands and Guam. As communist troops began to gain the upper hand in the Chinese Civil War, Horace A. Bass evacuated civilians of several nations from Nanking in November 1948. She departed China on 1 December 1948, arriving at San Diego on 21 December 1948 for repairs and training.

After exercises off San Diego and a large amphibious warfare training assault in Hawaii, Horace A. Bass' sailed from Hawaii on 14 November 1949 for another tour of duty in China. Arriving at Hong Kong on 30 November 1949, she remained in waters off China and Southeast Asian countries to protect American interests in the area, arriving at San Diego on 12 June 1950.

== Korean War service 1950-1953 ==
With the outbreak of the Korean War on 25 June 1950, American naval power moved swiftly into the Far East to support land operations. Horace A. Bass sailed on 14 July 1950 to join the fleet units already deployed off Korea, arriving 2 August 1950 with troops of the 2nd Marine Division. Underwater Demolition Teams and Marine Reconnaissance units were assigned to her, and she moved to the eastern coast of North Korea to carry out raids on Communist supply lines. Between 11 August 1950 and 17 August 1950 she made three successful raids, destroying three tunnels and two bridges. Horace A. Bass also conducted shore bombardments during daylight hours.

As United Nations forces prepared to go on the offensive, Horace A. Bass played an important part in the planning for the upcoming Inchon operation. Her raiding parties reconnoitered possible landing beaches between 20 August 1950 and 25 August 1950, and departed Pusan on 12 September 1950 for the main Inchon assault. Horace A. Bass put her troops ashore in the first wave on 15 September 1950, as the extremely successful amphibious operation suddenly reversed the course of the war.

As United Nations troops pushed northward, Howard A. Bass resumed her raiding duties, making two attacks on tunnels and bridges near Songjin between 6 October 1950 and 8 October 1950. For this operation Horace A. Bass carried Royal Marine Commandos. Late in October 1950 she took part in operations to clear the port of Wonsan for another landing, assisting minesweeping groups. She then spent three months on beach survey duty before sailing for the United States on 28 January 1951. For this highly successful tour of duty, Horace A. Bass and her special operations group received the Navy Unit Commendation.

Horace A. Bass steamed toward Korea again on 24 September 1951, and after stopping at Yokosuka resumed bombardment and raiding duties along the coast of North Korea. In 14 separate raids with American, British, and Republic of Korea landing parties, Horace A. Bass did much to interrupt the all-important supply lines from the north, which proved vulnerable to mobile forces afloat. She completed her second tour of duty in Korea on 3 July 1952, when she sailed from Yokosuka. She arrived at San Diego on 20 July 1952.

Horace A. Bass spent the next year in operations off the California coast, but sailed on 15 July 1953 for her third tour of Korean duty. The Korean War ended later that month while she was en route.

Horace A. Bass received six battle stars in addition to her Navy Unit Commendation for Korean War service. The battle stars were for:

- North Korean Aggression 8 September 1950 to 2 November 1950
- Communist China Aggression 4 November 1950 to 23 January 1951
- Inchon Landing 13 September 1950 to 16 September 1950
- United Nations Summer-Fall Offensive 27 November 1951
- Second Korean Winter 28 November 1951 to 5 December 1951, 7 December 1951 to 22 December 1951, 9 January 1952 to 13 January 1952, 20 January 1952 to 25 January 1952, 1 February 1952 to 4 February 1952, 29 February 1952 to 30 March 1952, and 19 April 1952 to 30 April 1952
- Korean Defense Summer-Fall 1952 1 May 1952 to 5 May 1952, 30 May 1952 to 13 June 1952, and 10 June 1952 to 25 June 1952

== Peacetime service 1953-1969 ==
Upon her arrival at Yokosuka on 3 August 1950, Horace A. Bass became flagship of an amphibious control squadron, and took part in various training landings in Japan. She also conducted three survey operations and two demolition assignments on the Korean coast, where the armistice was now in effect. She visited other Pacific ports during this period before departing Yokosuka on 5 April 1954.

She operated off the United States West Coast on training cruises and antisubmarine exercises until getting underway for the Far East again on 23 October 1954. She carried on practice landings in South Korea and took part in fleet exercises until February 1955, when she moved to the Taiwan Strait to evacuate Nationalist Chinese troops from the Tachen Islands. With this important Cold War operation over, Horace A. Bass steamed to Haiphong, French Indochina, on 26 February 1955 to take part in Operation Passage to Freedom, as thousands of Vietnamese from the north fled the advance of Communist forces. The transporting of these civilians to the south was completed on 20 March 1955, and Horace A. Bass was underway from Sasebo, Japan, on 4 April 1955, bound for San Diego.

After her arrival Horace A. Bass was transferred to the United States Atlantic Fleet, transiting the Panama Canal between 2 June 1955 and 4 June 1955 and arriving at Philadelphia, Pennsylvania, on 10 June 1955. She was then assigned to the 4th Naval District as a United States Naval Reserve training ship.

During the years that followed, Horace A. Bass made short cruises with naval reservists to Caribbean ports, Nova Scotia, and Newfoundland, helping to maintain the skills of hundreds of reserve officers and men.

Horace A. Bass arrived at Orange, Texas, on 3 November 1958, and decommissioned there on 9 February 1959. She entered the Atlantic Reserve Fleet at Orange.

She was recommissioned at an unrecorded date. She was redesignated as an "amphibious transport, small" and LPR-124 on 1 January 1969.

== Decommissioning and disposal ==
Horace A. Bass was decommissioned on 30 July 1969 and stricken from the Naval Register on 15 September 1974. She was sold for scrapping on 11 August 1975 to J. R. Steel, Inc. of Houston, Texas, for US$79,002.
