= Japanese battleship Nagato =

Super-dreadnought sunk by nuclear test in Bikini atoll

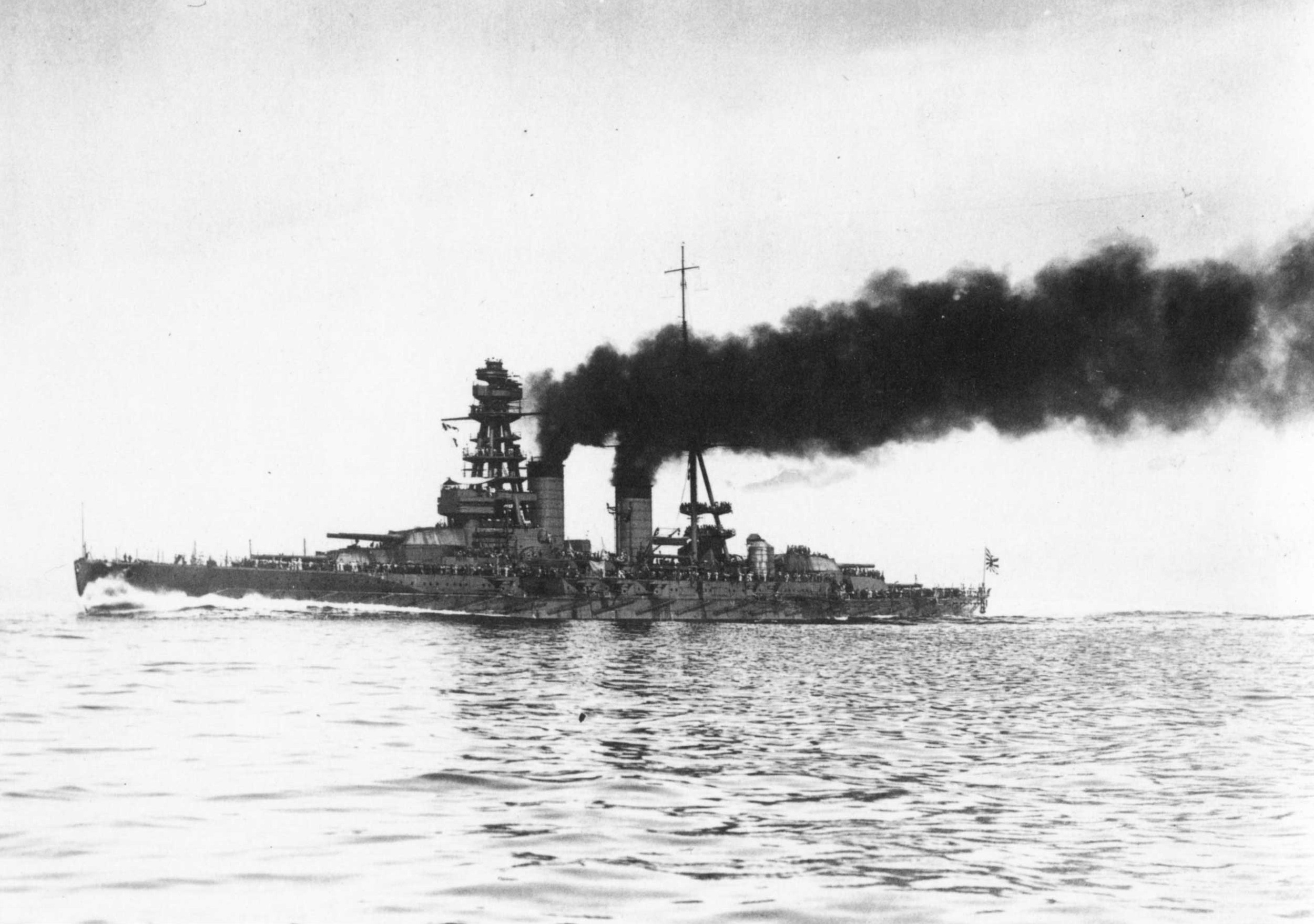
- Nagato on her sea trials, 30 September 1920

History

Japan
- Name: Nagato
- Namesake: Nagato Province
- Builder: Kure Naval Arsenal
- Laid down: 28 August 1917
- Launched: 9 November 1919
- Sponsored by: Admiral Katō Tomosaburō
- Completed: 15 November 1920
- Commissioned: 25 November 1920
- Refit: 1935, 1941, 1944
- Stricken: 15 September 1945
- Fate: Sunk as a target in Operation Crossroads, 29/30 July 1946

General characteristics (as built)
- Class & type: Nagato-class battleship
- Displacement: 32,720 t (32,200 long tons) (standard)
- Length: 215.8 m (708 ft)
- Beam: 29.02 m (95 ft 3 in)
- Draft: 9.08 m (29 ft 9 in)
- Installed power: 21 × water-tube boilers; 80,000 shp (60,000 kW)
- Propulsion: 4 shafts; 4 × steam turbines
- Speed: 26.5 knots (49.1 km/h; 30.5 mph)
- Range: 5,500 nmi (10,200 km; 6,300 mi) at 16 knots (30 km/h; 18 mph)
- Complement: 1,333
- Armament: 4 × twin 41 cm (16 in) guns; 20 × single 14 cm (5.5 in) guns; 4 × single 76 mm (3 in) AA guns; 8 × 533 mm (21.0 in) torpedo tubes
- Armor: Waterline belt: 100–305 mm (3.9–12.0 in); Deck: 69 mm (2.7 in) + 75 mm (3 in); Gun turrets: 190–356 mm (7.5–14.0 in); Barbettes: 305 mm (12 in); Conning tower: 369 mm (14.5 in)

General characteristics (1944)
- Displacement: 39,130 t (38,510 long tons) (standard)
- Length: 224.94 m (738 ft)
- Beam: 34.6 m (113 ft 6 in)
- Draft: 9.49 m (31 ft 2 in)
- Installed power: 80,000 shp (60,000 kW); 10 × water-tube boilers
- Speed: 25 knots (46 km/h; 29 mph)
- Range: 8,650 nmi (16,020 km; 9,950 mi) at 16 knots (30 km/h; 18 mph)
- Complement: 1,734
- Sensors & processing systems: 1 × Type 21 air search radar; 2 × Type 13 early-warning radars; 2 × Type 22 surface-search radars
- Armament: 4 × twin 41 cm guns; 18 × single 14 cm guns; 4 × twin 127 mm (5 in) DP guns; 98 × 25 mm (1 in) AA guns
- Armor: Deck: 69 mm (2.7 in) + 100 mm (3.9 in) + 38 mm (1.5 in); Turrets: 280–460 mm (11.0–18.1 in); Barbettes: 457 mm (18.0 in)
- Aircraft carried: 3 × floatplanes
- Aviation facilities: 1 × catapult

Nagato (Japanese: 長門; named after the ancient Nagato Province) was a super-dreadnought battleship built for the Imperial Japanese Navy (IJN). Completed in 1920 as the lead ship of her class, she carried supplies for the survivors of the Great Kantō earthquake in 1923. The ship was modernized in 1934–1936 with improvements to her armor and machinery and a rebuilt superstructure in the pagoda mast style. Nagato briefly participated in the Second Sino-Japanese War in 1937 and was the flagship of Admiral Isoroku Yamamoto during the attack on Pearl Harbor. She covered the withdrawal of the attacking ships and did not participate in the attack itself.

Other than participating in the Battle of Midway in June 1942, where she did not see combat, the ship spent most of the first two years of the Pacific War training in home waters. She was transferred to Truk in mid-1943, but did not see any combat until the Battle of the Philippine Sea in mid-1944 when she was attacked by American aircraft. Nagato did not fire her main armament against enemy vessels until the Battle of Leyte Gulf in October. She was lightly damaged during the battle and returned to Japan the following month. The IJN was running out of fuel by this time and decided not to fully repair her. Nagato was converted into a floating anti-aircraft platform and assigned to coastal defense duties. She was attacked in July 1945 as part of the American campaign to destroy the IJN's last remaining capital ships, but was only slightly damaged and went on to be the only Japanese battleship to have survived World War II. In mid-1946, the ship was a target for nuclear weapon tests during Operation Crossroads. She survived the first test with little damage, but was sunk by the second.

== Description ==
Nagato had a length of 201.17 meters (660 ft) between perpendiculars and 215.8 meters (708 ft) overall. She had a beam of 29.02 meters (95 ft 3 in) and a draft of 9.08 meters (29 ft 9 in). The ship displaced 32,720 metric tons (32,200 long tons) at standard load and 39,116 metric tons (38,498 long tons) at full load. Her crew consisted of 1,333 officers and enlisted men as built and 1,368 in 1935. The crew totaled around 1,734 men in 1944.

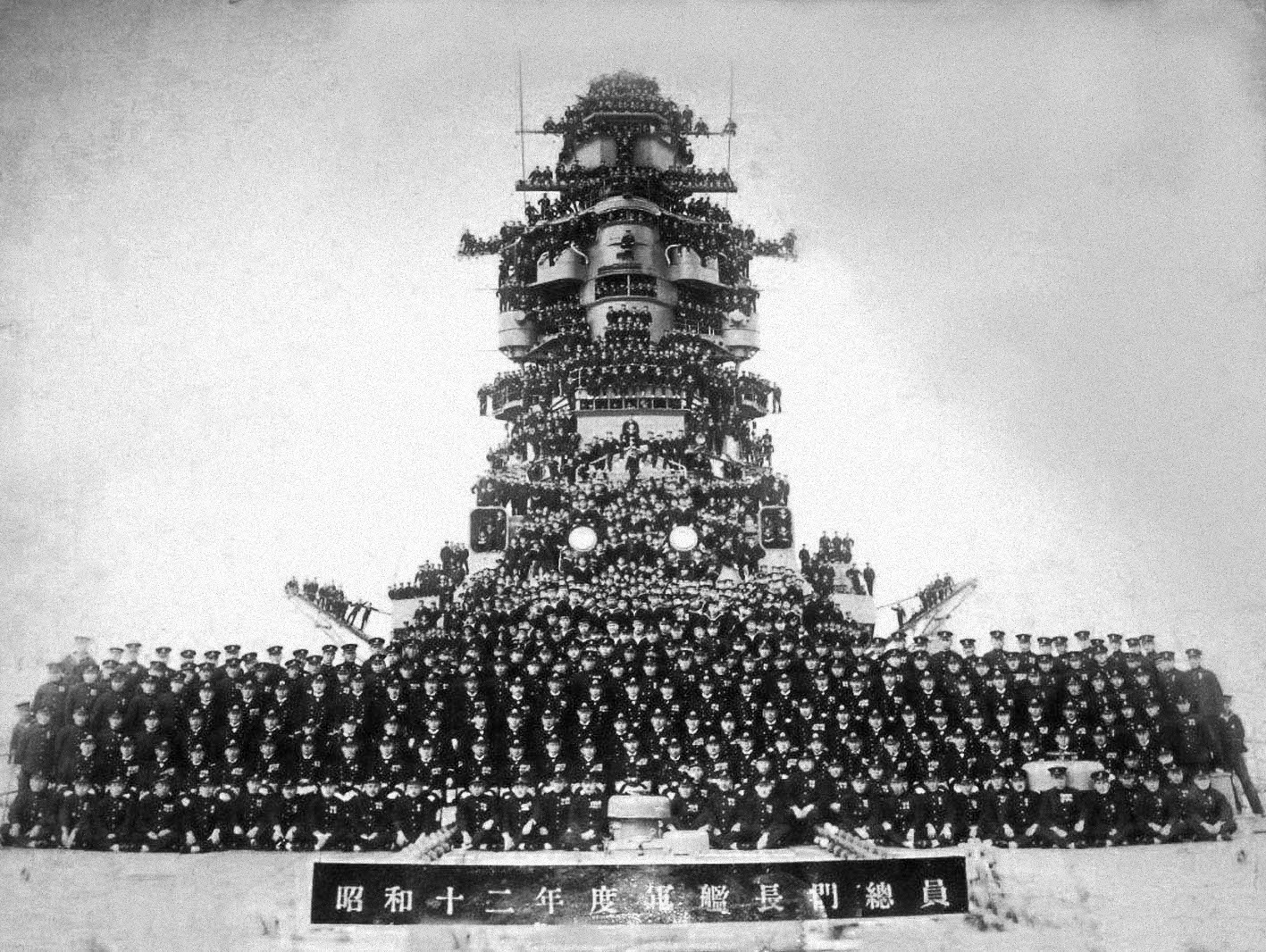
Nagato and her crew in 1937 on the recently installed pagoda mast

In 1930, Nagato's bow was remodeled to reduce the amount of spray produced when steaming into a head sea. This increased her overall length by 1.59 meters (5 ft 3 in) to 217.39 meters (713 ft 3 in). During her 1934–1936 reconstruction, the ship's stern was lengthened by 7.55 meters (24.8 ft) to improve her speed and her forward superstructure was rebuilt into a pagoda mast. She was given torpedo bulges to improve her underwater protection and to compensate for the weight of the additional armor and equipment. These changes increased her overall length to 224.94 m (738 ft), her beam to 34.6 m (113 ft 6 in) and her draft to 9.49 meters (31 ft 2 in). Her displacement increased over 7,000 metric tons (6,900 long tons) to 46,690 metric tons (45,950 long tons) at deep load. The ship's metacentric height at deep load was 2.35 meters (7 ft 9 in). In November 1944, the tops of Nagato's mainmast and funnel were removed to improve the effective arcs of fire for her anti-aircraft guns.

=== Propulsion ===
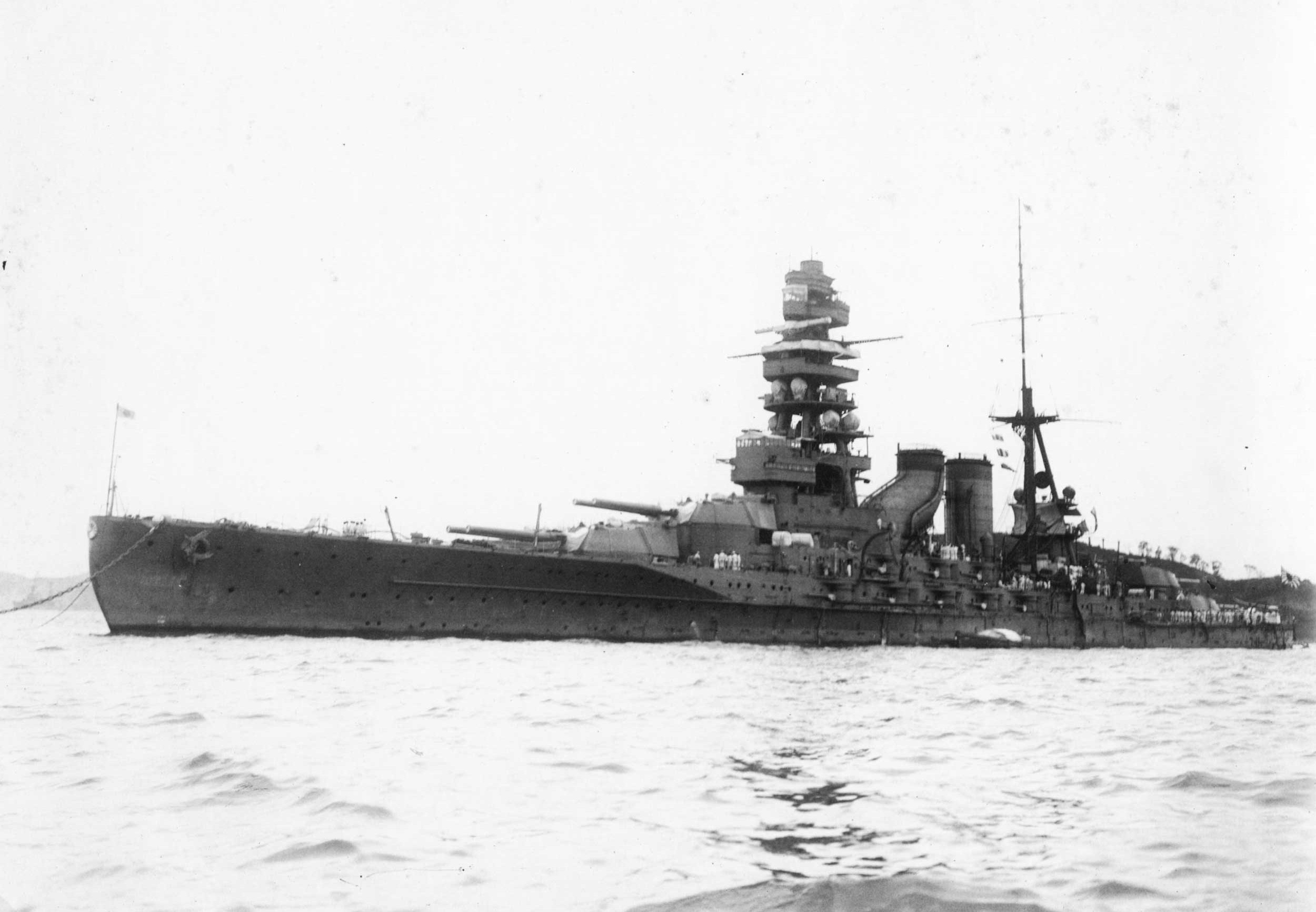
Nagato at anchor in Yokosuka, October 1927

Nagato was equipped with four Gihon geared steam turbines, each of which drove one propeller shaft. The turbines were designed to produce a total of 80,000 shaft horsepower (60,000 kW), using steam provided by 21 Kampon water-tube boilers; 15 of these were oil-fired while the remaining half-dozen consumed a mixture of coal and oil. The ship could carry 1,600 long tons (1,600 t) of coal and 3,400 long tons (3,500 t) of fuel oil, giving her a range of 5,500 nautical miles (10,200 km; 6,300 mi) at a speed of 16 knots (30 km/h; 18 mph). The ship exceeded her designed speed of 26.5 knots (49.1 km/h; 30.5 mph) during her sea trials, reaching 26.7 knots (49.4 km/h; 30.7 mph) at 85,500 shp (63,800 kW).

Funnel smoke would often choke and blind crewmen on the bridge and in the fire-control systems so a "fingernail"-shaped deflector was installed on the fore funnel in 1922 to direct the exhaust away from them. It was less than effective and the fore funnel was rebuilt in a serpentine shape in an unsuccessful effort during a refit in 1924. That funnel was eliminated during the ship's 1930s reconstruction when all of her boilers were replaced by ten oil-fired Kampon boilers, which had a working pressure of 22 kg/cm^{2} (2,157 kPa; 313 psi) and temperature of 300 °C (572 °F). In addition her turbines were replaced by lighter, more modern, units. When Nagato conducted her post-reconstruction trials, she reached a speed of 24.98 knots (46.26 km/h; 28.75 mph) with 82,300 shp (61,400 kW). Additional fuel oil was stored in the bottoms of the newly added torpedo bulges, which increased her capacity to 5,560 long tons (5,650 t) and thus her range to 8,560 nmi (15,850 km; 9,850 mi) at 16 knots.

=== Armament ===
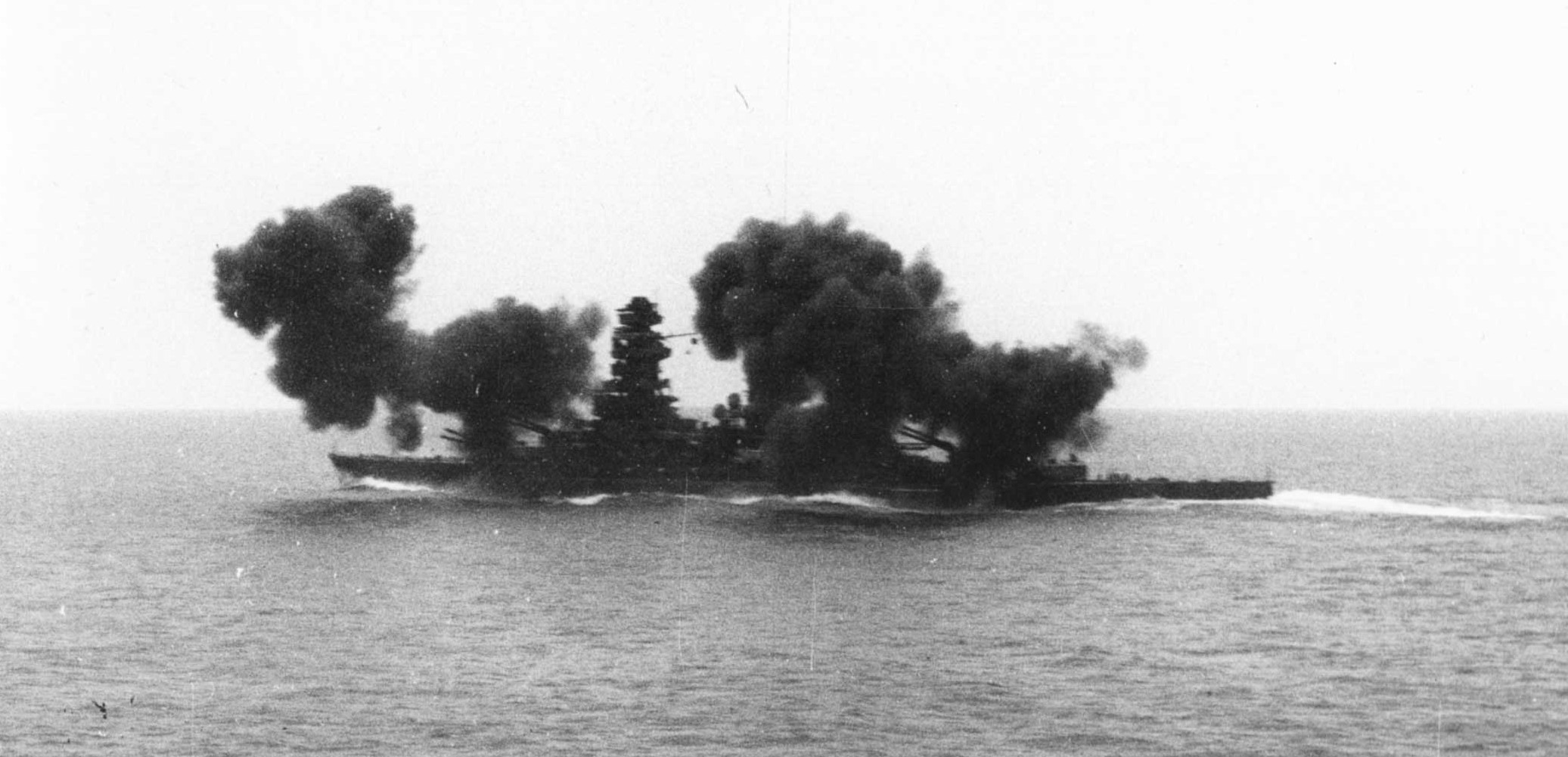
Nagato firing her main armament, 1936

Nagato's eight 45-caliber 41-centimeter (16 inch) guns were mounted in two pairs of twin-gun, superfiring turrets fore and aft. Numbered one through four from front to rear, the hydraulically powered turrets gave the guns an elevation range of −2 to +35 degrees. The rate of fire for the guns was around two rounds per minute. The turrets aboard the Nagato-class ships were replaced in the mid-1930s with the turrets stored from the unfinished Tosa-class battleships. While in storage the turrets had been modified to increase their range of elevation to –3 to +43 degrees, which increased the gun's maximum range from 30,200 to 37,900 meters (33,000 to 41,400 yd).

The ship's secondary armament of twenty 50-caliber 14-centimeter guns was mounted in casemates on the upper sides of the hull and in the superstructure. The manually operated guns had a maximum range of 20,500 metres (22,400 yd) and fired at a rate of six to 10 rounds per minute. Anti-aircraft defense was provided by four 40-caliber 3rd Year Type three-inch (Note: These guns were license-built British quick-firing guns (QF) 12-pounder guns. While the Japanese designated them as 8 cm, their actual caliber was 76.2 mm.) AA guns in single mounts. The 3-inch (76 mm) high-angle guns had a maximum elevation of +75 degrees, and had a rate of fire of 13 to 20 rounds per minute. The ship was also fitted with eight 53.3-centimeter (21.0 in) torpedo tubes, four on each broadside, two above water and two submerged.

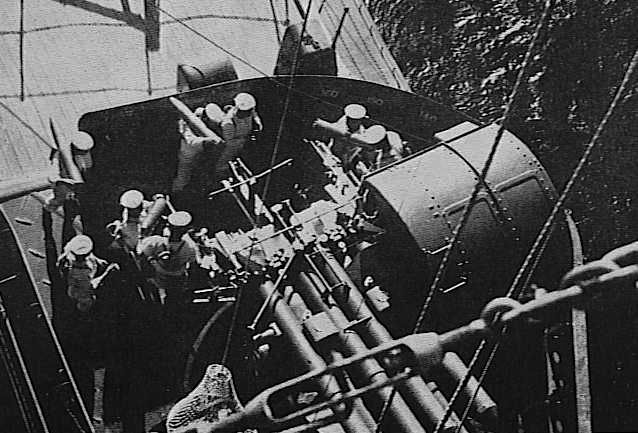
A twin 127 mm gun mount aboard Nagato

Around 1926, the four above-water torpedo tubes were removed and the ship received three additional 76 mm AA guns that were situated around the base of the foremast. They were replaced by eight 40-caliber 12.7-centimeter Type 89 dual-purpose (DP) guns in 1932, fitted on both sides of the fore and aft superstructures in four twin-gun mounts. When firing at surface targets, the guns had a range of 14,700 meters (16,100 yd); they had a maximum ceiling of 9,440 meters (30,970 ft) at their maximum elevation of +90 degrees. Their maximum rate of fire was 14 rounds a minute, but their sustained rate of fire was around eight rounds per minute. Two twin-gun mounts for license-built Vickers two-pounder light AA guns were also added to the ship that same year. (Note: Skwiot says two single mounts in 1932–1934 and another pair, mounted near the aft funnel, were added in 1934.) These guns had a maximum elevation of +80 degrees which gave them a ceiling of 4,000 meters (13,000 ft). They had a maximum rate of fire of 200 rounds per minute.

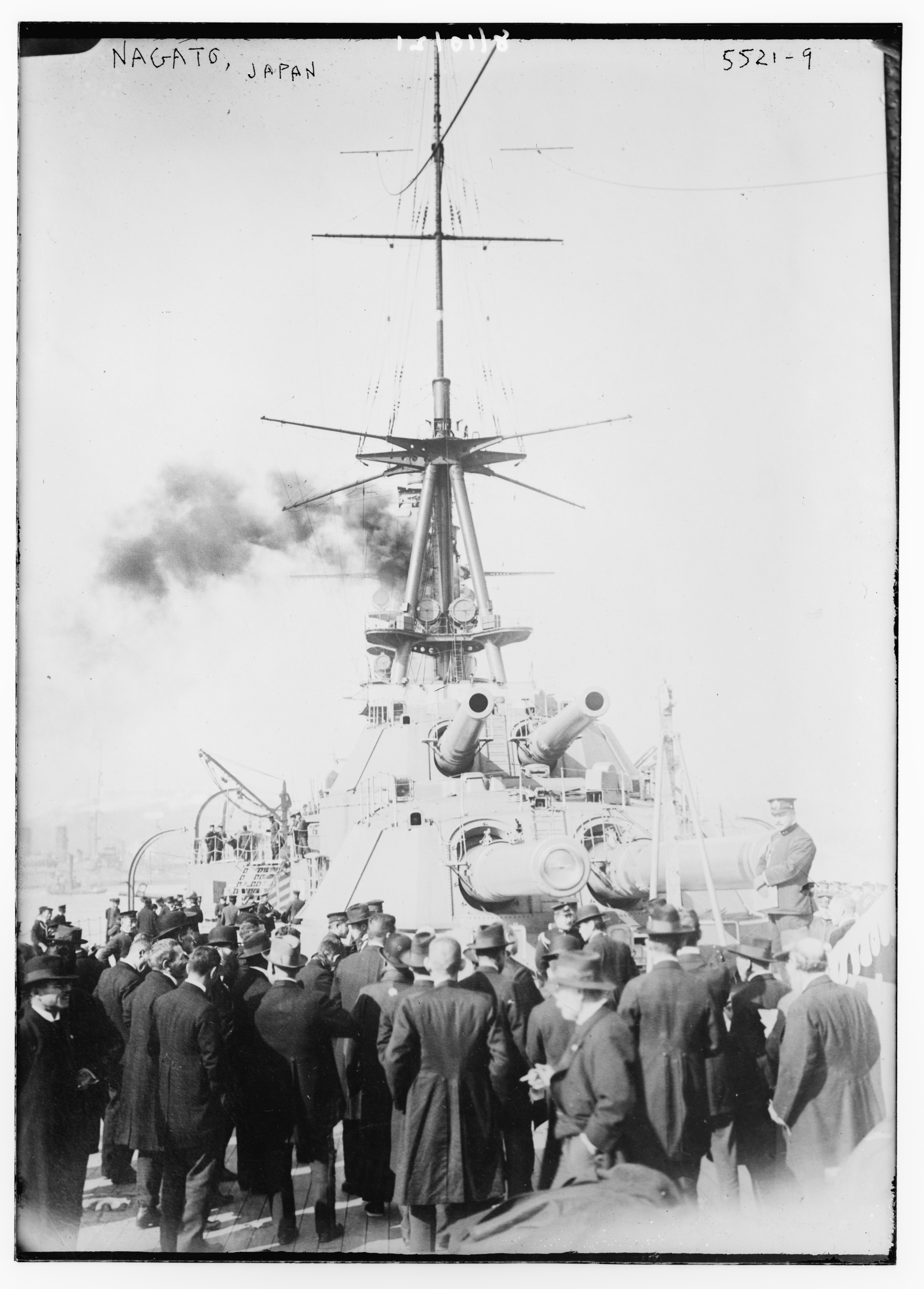
Photograph shows the rear turret, between ca. 1920 and ca. 1925

When the ship was reconstructed in 1934–1936, the remaining torpedo tubes and the two forward 14 cm (5 1/2-inch) guns were removed from the hull. The remaining 14 cm guns had their elevation increased to +35 degrees which increased their range to 20,000 meters (22,000 yd). An unknown number of license-built Hotchkiss M1929 machine gun 13.2 mm (0.52 in) in twin mounts were added. The maximum range of these guns was 6,500 meters (7,100 yd), but the effective range against aircraft was 700–1,500 meters (770–1,640 yd). The cyclic rate was adjustable between 425 and 475 rounds per minute, but the need to change 30-round magazines reduced the effective rate to 250 rounds per minute.

The unsatisfactory two-pounders were replaced in 1939 by twenty license-built Type 96 Hotchkiss Type 96 25 mm (0.98 in) light AA guns in a mixture of twin-gun and single mounts. This was the standard Japanese light AA gun during World War II, but it suffered from severe design shortcomings that rendered it a largely ineffective weapon. According to historian Mark Stille, the twin and triple mounts "lacked sufficient speed in train or elevation; the gun sights were unable to handle fast targets; the gun exhibited excessive vibration; the magazine was too small, and, finally, the gun produced excessive muzzle blast". These 25 mm guns had an effective range of 1,500–3,000 meters (1,600–3,300 yd), and an effective ceiling of 5,500 meters (18,000 ft) at an elevation of 85 degrees. The maximum effective rate of fire was only between 110 and 120 rounds per minute because of the frequent need to change the fifteen-round magazines. Additional Type 96 guns were installed during the war; on 10 July 1944, the ship was reported to have 98 guns on board. An additional 30 guns were added during a refit in Yokosuka in November. Two more twin 12.7 cm (5 inch) gun mounts were added at the same time abreast the funnel and her 14 cm guns were removed as she was by then a floating anti-aircraft battery.

=== Armor ===
The ship's waterline armor belt was 305 mm (12 in) thick and tapered to a thickness of 100 mm (3.9 in) at its bottom edge; above it was a strake of 229 mm (9.0 in) armor. The main deck armor was 69 mm (2.7 in) while the lower deck was 75 mm (3 in) thick. The turrets were protected with an armor thickness of 305 mm on the face, 230–190 mm (9.1–7.5 in) on the sides, and 152–127 mm (6.0–5.0 in) on the roof. The barbettes of the turrets were protected by armor 305 mm thick, while the casemates of the 140 mm (1.6 in) guns were protected by 25 mm (0.98 in) armor plates. The sides of the conning tower were 369 mm (14.5 in) thick.

The new 41 cm turrets installed during Nagato's reconstruction were more heavily armored than the original ones. Face armor was increased to 460 mm (18.1 in), the sides to 280 mm (11.0 in), and the roof to 250–230 mm (9.8–9.1 in). The armor over the machinery and magazines was increased by 38 mm on the upper deck and 25 mm (0.98 in) on the upper armored deck. These additions increased the weight of the ship's armor to 13,032 metric tons (12,826 long tons), 32.6 percent of her displacement. In early 1941, as a preparation for war, Nagato's barbette armor was reinforced with 100 mm (3.9 in) armor plates above the main deck and 215 mm (8.5 in) plates below it.

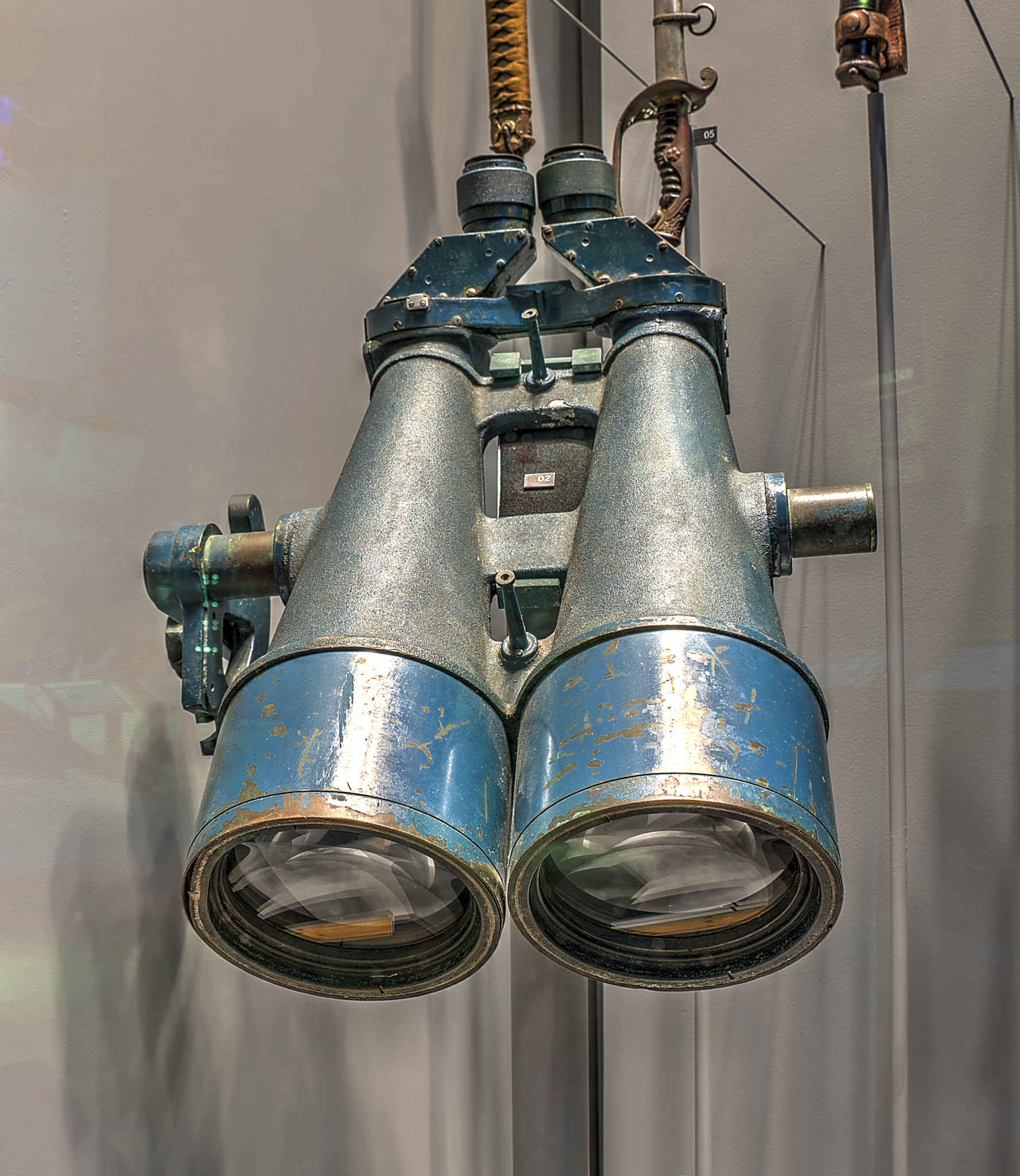
Binoculars from the Nagato on display at the National World War II Museum

=== Fire control and sensors ===
When completed in 1920, the ship was fitted with a 10-meter (32 ft 10 in) rangefinder in the forward superstructure; six-meter (19 ft 8 in) and three-meter (9 ft 10 in) anti-aircraft rangefinders were added in May 1921 and 1923, respectively. The rangefinders in the second and third turrets were replaced by 10-meter units in 1932–1933.

Nagato was initially fitted with a Type 13 fire-control system derived from Vickers equipment received during World War I, but this was replaced by an improved Type 14 system around 1925. It controlled the main and secondary guns; no provision was made for anti-aircraft fire until the Type 31 fire-control director was introduced in 1932. A modified Type 14 fire-control system was tested aboard the ship in 1935 and later approved for service as the Type 34. A new anti-aircraft director called the Type 94 that was used to control the 127 mm AA guns was introduced in 1937, although when Nagato received hers is unknown. The Type 96 25 mm (0.98 in) AA guns were controlled by a Type 95 director that was also introduced in 1937.

While in drydock in May 1943, a Type 21 air search radar was installed on the roof of the 10-meter rangefinder at the top of the pagoda mast. On 27 June 1944, two Type 22 surface search radars were installed on the pagoda mast and two Type 13 early warning radars were fitted on her mainmast.

=== Aircraft ===
Nagato was fitted with an 18-meter (59 ft 1 in) aircraft flying-off platform on Turret No. 2 in August 1925. Yokosuka Ro-go Ko-gata and Heinkel HD 25 floatplanes were tested from it before it was removed early the following year. An additional boom was added to the mainmast in 1926 to handle the Yokosuka E1Y now assigned to the ship. A Hansa-Brandenburg W.33 floatplane was tested aboard Nagato that same year. A catapult was fitted between the mainmast and Turret No. 3 in mid-1933, a collapsible crane was installed in a portside sponson, and the ship was equipped to operate two or three floatplanes, although no hangar was provided. The ship now operated Nakajima E4N2 biplanes until they were replaced by Nakajima E8N2 biplanes in 1938. A more powerful catapult was installed in November 1938 to handle heavier aircraft, such as the one Kawanishi E7K that was added in 1939–1940. Mitsubishi F1M biplanes replaced the E8Ns on 11 February 1943.

== Construction and career ==
Nagato, named for Nagato Province, was ordered on 12 May 1916 and laid down at the Kure Naval Arsenal on 28 August 1917 as the lead ship of her class. She was launched on 9 November 1919 by Admiral Katō Tomosaburō, completed on 15 November 1920 and commissioned 10 days later with Captain Nobutaro Iida in command. Nagato was assigned to the 1st Battleship Division and became the flagship of Rear Admiral Sōjirō Tochinai. On 13 February 1921, the ship was inspected by the Crown Prince, Hirohito. Captain Kanari Kabayama relieved Iida on 1 December 1921. The ship hosted Marshal Joseph Joffre on 18 February 1922 and Edward, Prince of Wales, and his aide-de-camp Lieutenant Louis Mountbatten on 12 April during the prince's visit to Japan.

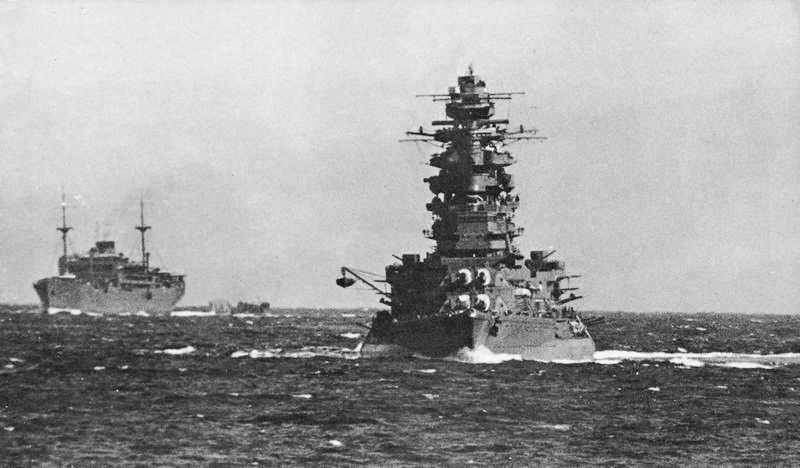
Nagato and Yasukuni Maru at sea, October 1941

After the 1923 Great Kantō earthquake, Nagato loaded supplies from Kyushu for the victims on 4 September. Together with her sister ship Mutsu, she sank the hulk of the obsolete battleship Satsuma on 7 September 1924 during gunnery practice in Tokyo Bay in accordance with the Washington Naval Treaty. The ship was transferred to the reserve of the 1st Division on 1 December and became a gunnery training ship. In August 1925, aircraft handling and take-off tests were conducted aboard Nagato. She was reassigned as the flagship of the Combined Fleet on 1 December, flying the flag of Admiral Keisuke Okada. Captain Kiyoshi Hasegawa assumed command of the ship on 1 December 1926.

Nagato was again placed in reserve on 1 December 1931 and her anti-aircraft armament was upgraded the following year. In August 1933 the ship participated in fleet maneuvers north of the Marshall Islands and she began her first modernization on 1 April 1934. This was completed on 31 January 1936 and Nagato was assigned to the 1st Battleship Division of the 1st Fleet. During the attempted coup d'état on 26 February by disgruntled Army officers, the ship was deployed in Tokyo Bay and some of her sailors were landed in support of the government. In August, she transported 1,749 men of the 43rd Infantry Regiment of the 11th Infantry Division from Shikoku to Shanghai during the Second Sino-Japanese War. Her floatplanes bombed targets in Shanghai on 24 August before she returned to Sasebo the following day. Nagato became a training ship on 1 December until she again became the flagship of the Combined Fleet on 15 December 1938. The ship participated in an Imperial Fleet Review on 11 October 1940. She was refitted in early 1941 in preparation for war.

=== World War II ===
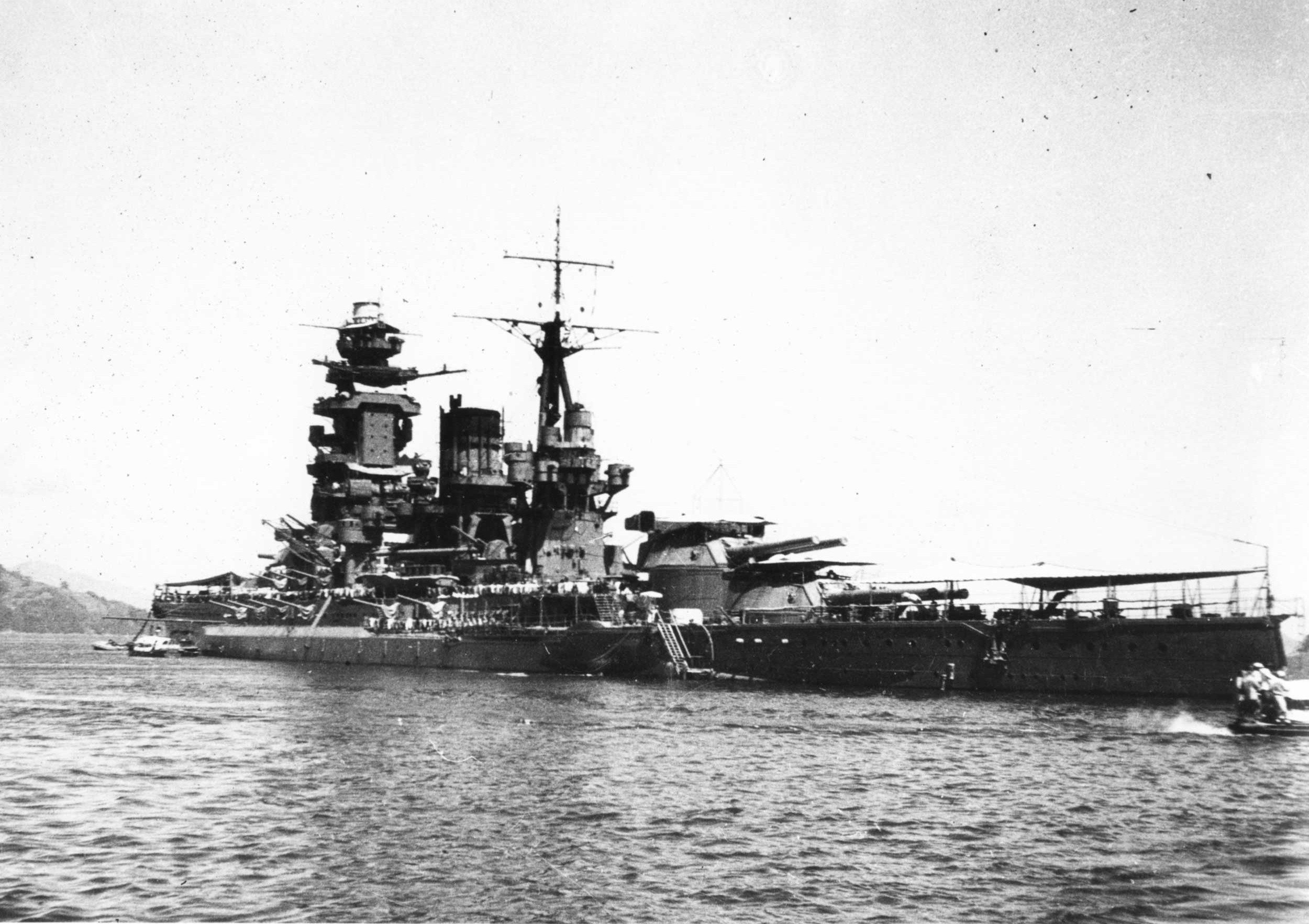
Rear oblique view of Nagato at anchor in Kure, August 1942

Admiral Isoroku Yamamoto issued the code phrase "Niitaka yama nobore" (Climb Mount Niitaka) on 2 December 1941 from Nagato at anchor at Hashirajima to signal the 1st Air Fleet (Kido Butai) in the North Pacific to proceed with its attack on Pearl Harbor. When the war started for Japan on 8 December, (Note: Japan Standard Time is 19 hours ahead of Hawaiian Standard Time, so in Japan, the attack on Pearl Harbor happened on 8 December.) she sortied for the Bonin Islands, along with Mutsu, the battleships Hyūga, Yamashiro, Fusō, Ise of Battleship Division 2, and the light carrier Hōshō as distant cover for the withdrawal of the fleet attacking Pearl Harbor, and returned six days later. Yamamoto transferred his flag to the new battleship Yamato on 12 February 1942. Nagato was briefly refitted 15 March – 9 April at Kure Naval Arsenal.

In June 1942 Nagato, commanded by Captain Hideo Yano, was assigned to the Main Body of the 1st Fleet during the Battle of Midway, together with Yamato, Mutsu, Hosho, the light cruiser Sendai, nine destroyers and four auxiliary ships. Following the loss of all four carriers of the 1st Air Fleet on 4 June, Yamamoto attempted to lure the American forces west to within range of the Japanese air groups at Wake Island, and into a night engagement with his surface forces, but the American forces withdrew and Nagato saw no action. After rendezvousing with the remnants of the 1st Air Fleet on 6 June, survivors from the aircraft carrier Kaga were transferred to Nagato. On 14 July, the ship was transferred to Battleship Division 2 and she became the flagship of the 1st Fleet. Yano was promoted to rear admiral on 1 November and he was replaced by Captain Yonejiro Hisamune nine days later. Nagato remained in Japanese waters training until August 1943. On 2 August Captain Mikio Hayakawa assumed command of the ship.

That month, Nagato, Yamato, Fusō and the escort carrier Taiyō, escorted by two heavy cruisers and five destroyers transferred to Truk in the Caroline Islands. In response to the carrier raid on Tarawa on 18 September, Nagato and much of the fleet sortied for Eniwetok to search for the American forces before they returned to Truk on 23 September, having failed to locate them. The Japanese had intercepted some American radio traffic that suggested an attack on Wake Island, and on 17 October, Nagato and the bulk of the 1st Fleet sailed for Eniwetok to be in a position to intercept any such attack. The fleet arrived on 19 October, departed four days later, and arrived back at Truk on 26 October. Hayakawa was promoted to rear admiral on 1 November and he was relieved on 25 December by Captain Yuji Kobe.

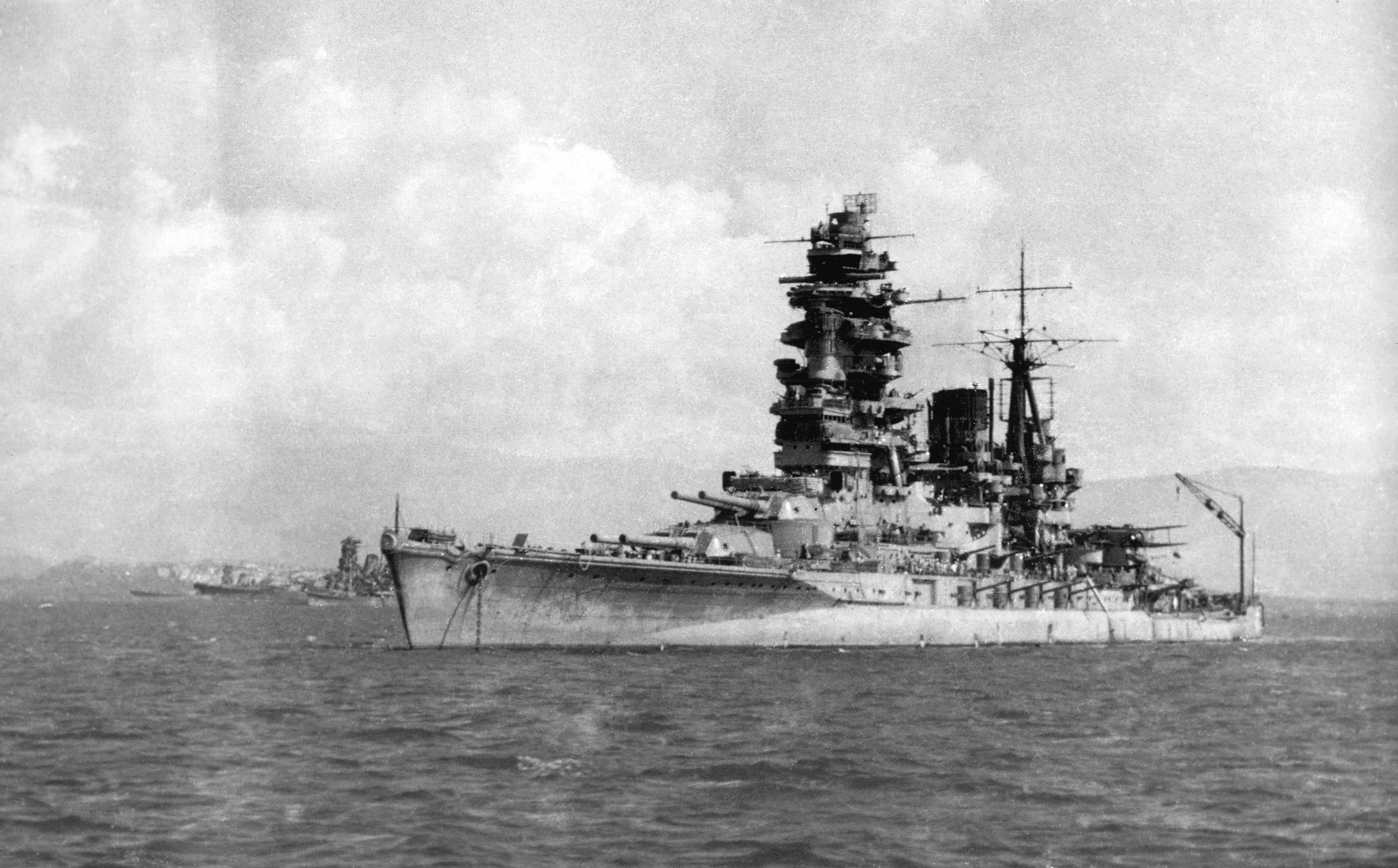
Nagato at anchor in Brunei Bay, October 1944, shortly before the Battle of Leyte Gulf

On 1 February 1944, Nagato departed Truk with Fusō to avoid an American air raid, and arrived at Palau on 4 February. They departed on 16 February to escape another air raid. The ships arrived on 21 February at Lingga Island, near Singapore, and the ship became the flagship of Vice Admiral Matome Ugaki, commander of Battleship Division 1, on 25 February, until he transferred his flag to Yamato on 5 May. Aside from a brief refit at Singapore, the ship remained at Lingga training until 11 May when she was transferred to Tawi-Tawi on 12 May. The division was now assigned to the 1st Mobile Fleet, under the command of Vice Admiral Jisaburō Ozawa.

On 10 June, Battleship Division 1 departed Tawi-Tawi for Batjan in preparation for Operation Kon, a planned counterattack against the American invasion of Biak. Three days later, when Admiral Soemu Toyoda, commander-in-chief of the Combined Fleet, was notified of American attacks on Saipan, Operation Kon was canceled and Ugaki's force was diverted to the Mariana Islands. The battleships rendezvoused with Ozawa's main force on 16 June. During the Battle of the Philippine Sea, Nagato escorted the aircraft carriers Jun'yō, Hiyō and the light carrier Ryūhō. She fired 41 cm Type 3 Sankaidan incendiary anti-aircraft shrapnel shells at aircraft from the light carrier Belleau Wood that were attacking Jun'yō and claimed to have shot down two Grumman TBF Avenger torpedo bombers. The ship was strafed by American aircraft during the battle, but was not damaged and suffered no casualties. During the battle Nagato rescued survivors from Hiyō that were transferred to the carrier Zuikaku once the ship reached Okinawa on 22 June. She continued on to Kure where she was refitted with additional radars and light AA guns. Undocked on 8 July, Nagato loaded a regiment of the 28th Infantry Division the following day and delivered them to Okinawa on 11 July. She arrived at Lingga via Manila on 20 July.

==== Battle of Leyte Gulf ====
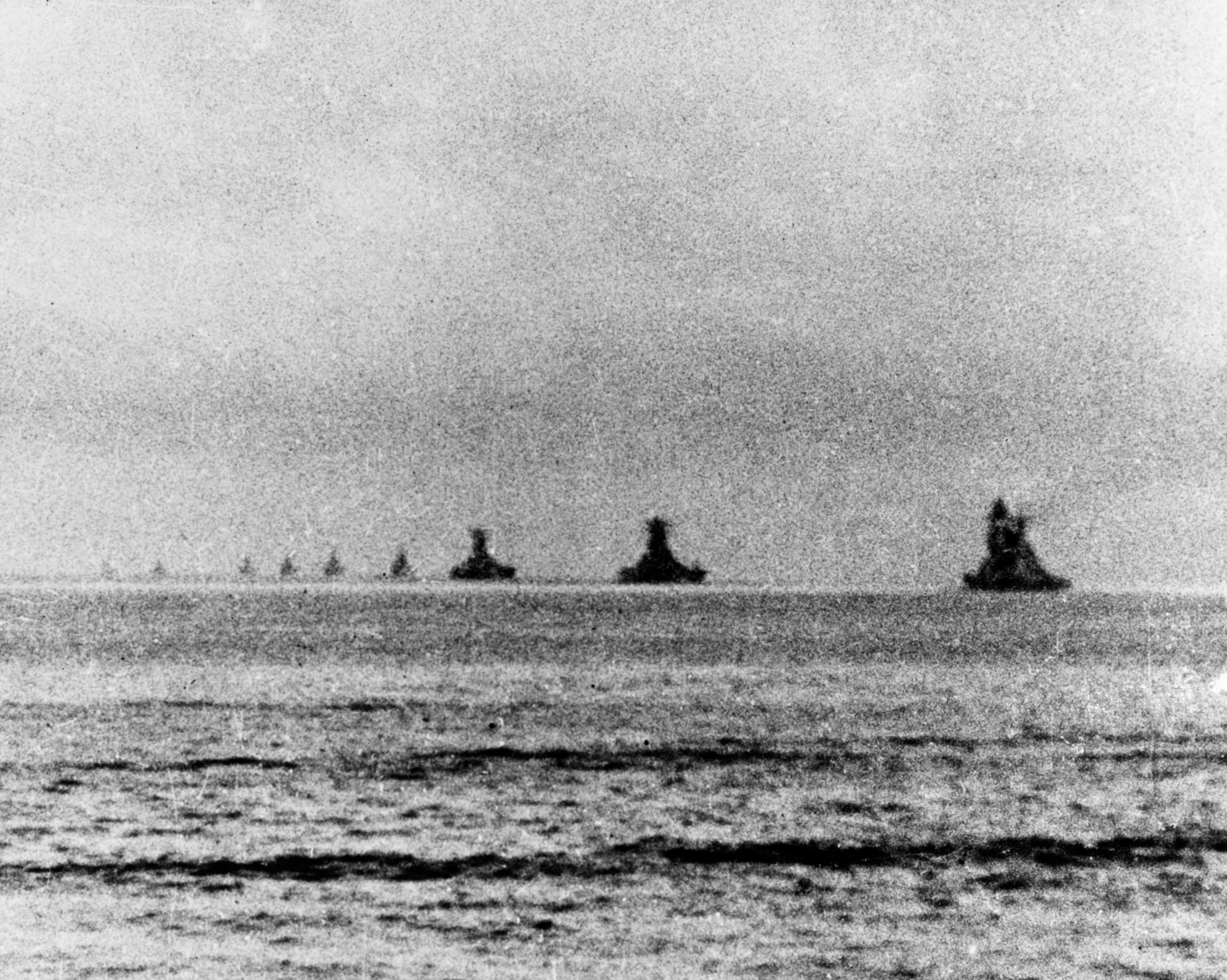
Center Force sorties from Brunei Bay, Borneo: six heavy cruisers head to sea, followed by Yamato, Musashi and Nagato

Kobe was promoted to rear admiral on 15 October. Three days later, Nagato sailed for Brunei Bay, Borneo, to join the main Japanese fleet in preparation for "Operation Sho-1", the counterattack planned against the American landings at Leyte. The Japanese plan called for Ozawa's carrier forces to lure the American carrier fleets north of Leyte so that Vice Admiral Takeo Kurita's 1st Diversion Force (also known as the Center Force) could enter Leyte Gulf and destroy American forces landing on the island. Nagato, together with the rest of Kurita's force, departed Brunei for the Philippines on 22 October.

In the Battle of the Sibuyan Sea on 24 October, Nagato was attacked by multiple waves of American dive bombers and fighters. At 14:16 (Note: All times in this article are Japan Standard Time, one hour behind the times quoted in most American books on the Battle of Leyte Gulf.) she was hit by two bombs dropped by planes from the fleet carrier Franklin and the light carrier Cabot. The first bomb disabled five of her casemate guns, jammed one of her Type 89 gun mounts, and damaged the air intake to No. 1 boiler room, immobilizing one propeller shaft for 24 minutes until the boiler was put back online. Damage from the second bomb is unknown. The two bombs killed 52 men between them; the number of wounded is not known.

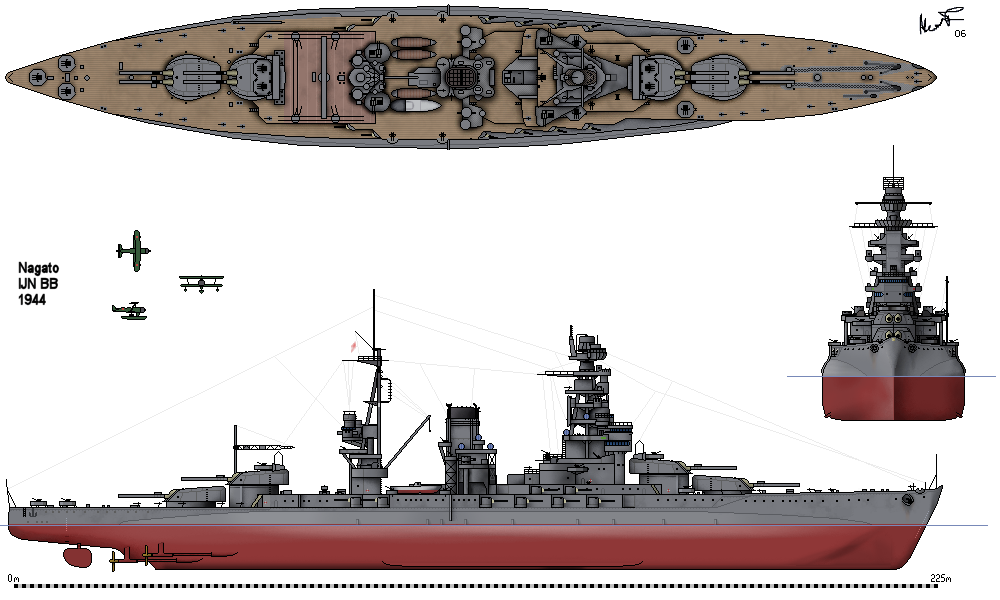
Drawing of Nagato as she appeared in 1944

On the morning of 25 October, the 1st Diversion Force passed through the San Bernardino Strait and headed for Leyte Gulf to attack the American forces supporting the invasion. In the Battle off Samar, Nagato engaged the escort carriers and destroyers of Task Group 77.4.3, codenamed "Taffy 3". At 06:01 she opened fire on three escort carriers, the first time she had ever fired her guns at an enemy ship, but missed. At 06:54 the destroyer USS Heermann fired a spread of torpedoes at the fast battleship Haruna; the torpedoes missed Haruna and headed for Yamato and Nagato which were on a parallel course. The two battleships were forced 10 miles (16 km) away from the engagement before the torpedoes ran out of fuel. Turning back, Nagato engaged the American escort carriers and their screening ships, claiming to have damaged one cruiser (Note: No cruisers were present, only destroyers and destroyer escorts. In the Battle off Samar, Japanese observers misidentified Taffy 3's escort carriers, destroyers and destroyer escorts as larger light carriers, cruisers and destroyers.) with forty-five 410 mm and ninety-two 14 cm shells. The ineffectiveness of her shooting was the result of the poor visibility caused by numerous rain squalls and by smoke screens laid by the defending escorts. At 09:10 Kurita ordered his ships to break off the engagement and head north. At 10:20 he ordered the fleet south once more, but as they came under increasingly severe air attack he ordered a retreat again at 12:36. At 12:43 Nagato was hit in the bow by two bombs, but the damage was not severe. Four gunners were washed overboard at 16:56 as the ship made a sharp turn to avoid dive-bomber attacks; a destroyer was detached to rescue them, but they could not be found. As it retreated back to Brunei on 26 October, the Japanese fleet came under repeated air attacks. Nagato and Yamato used Sankaidan shells against them and claimed to have shot down several bombers. Over the course of the last two days she fired ninety-nine 410 mm and six hundred fifty-three 14 cm shells, suffering 38 crewmen killed and 105 wounded during the same time.

==== Final days of the war ====
On 15 November the ship was assigned to Battleship Division 3 of the 2nd Fleet. After an aerial attack at Brunei on 16 November, Nagato, Yamato, and the fast battleship Kongō left the following day, bound for Kure. En route, Kongō and one of the escorting destroyers were sunk by USS Sealion on 21 November. On 25 November, she arrived at Yokosuka, Japan, for repairs. Lack of fuel and materials meant that she could not be brought back into service and she was turned into a floating anti-aircraft battery. Her funnel and mainmast were removed to improve the arcs of fire of her AA guns, which were increased by two Type 89 mounts and nine triple Type 96 gun mounts. Her forward secondary guns were removed in compensation. Captain Kiyomi Shibuya relieved Kobe in command of Nagato on 25 November. Battleship Division 3 was disbanded on 1 January 1945 and the ship was reassigned to Battleship Division 1. That formation was disbanded on 10 February and she was assigned to the Yokosuka Naval District as a coastal defense ship. Moored alongside a pier, a coal-burning donkey boiler was installed on the pier for heating and cooking purposes and a converted submarine chaser was positioned alongside to provide steam and electricity; her anti-aircraft guns lacked full power and were only partially operational. On 20 April, Nagato was reduced to reserve and retired Rear Admiral Miki Otsuka assumed command a week later.

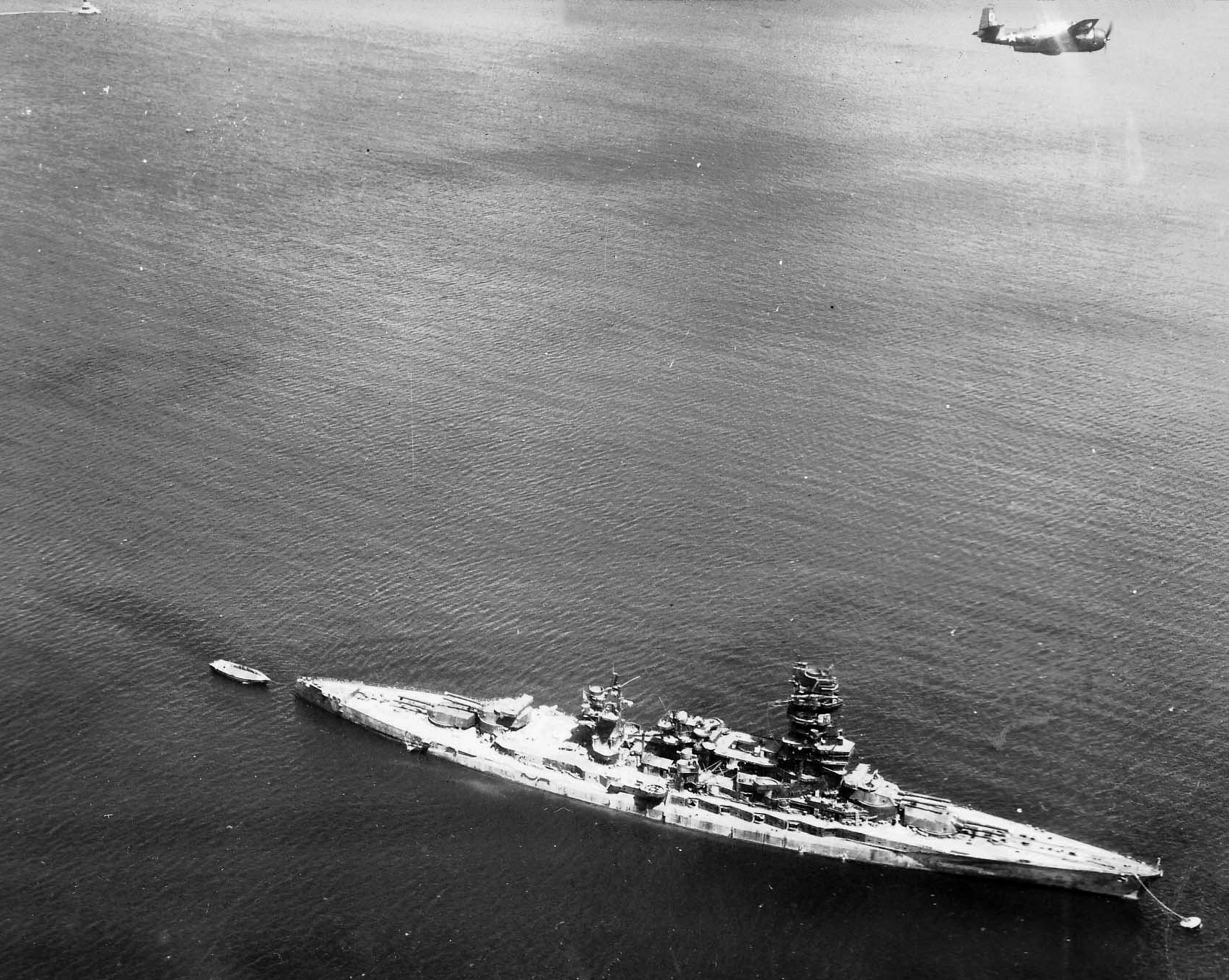
An Avenger flies past Nagato as she lies at anchor in Yokosuka, probably after the surrender. c. August, 1945

In June 1945, all of her secondary guns and about half of her anti-aircraft armament was moved ashore, together with her rangefinders and searchlights. Her crew was accordingly reduced to less than 1,000 officers and enlisted men. On 18 July 1945, the heavily camouflaged ship was attacked by fighter bombers and torpedo bombers from five American carriers as part of Admiral William Halsey Jr.'s campaign to destroy the IJN's last surviving capital ships. Nagato was hit by two bombs, the first 500-pound (230 kg) bomb struck the bridge and killed Otsuka, the executive officer, and twelve sailors when it detonated upon hitting the roof of the conning tower. The second 500-pound bomb struck the deck aft of the mainmast and detonated when it hit No. 3 barbette. It failed to damage the barbette or the turret above it, but blew a hole nearly 12 feet (3.7 m) in diameter in the deck above the officer's lounge, killing 21 men and damaging four Type 96 guns on the deck above. A dud rocket of uncertain size hit the ship's fantail, but failed to do any significant damage. To convince the Americans that Nagato had been badly damaged by the attack, her damage was left unrepaired and some of her ballast tanks were pumped full of seawater to make her sit deeper in the water as if she had sunk to the harbor bottom.

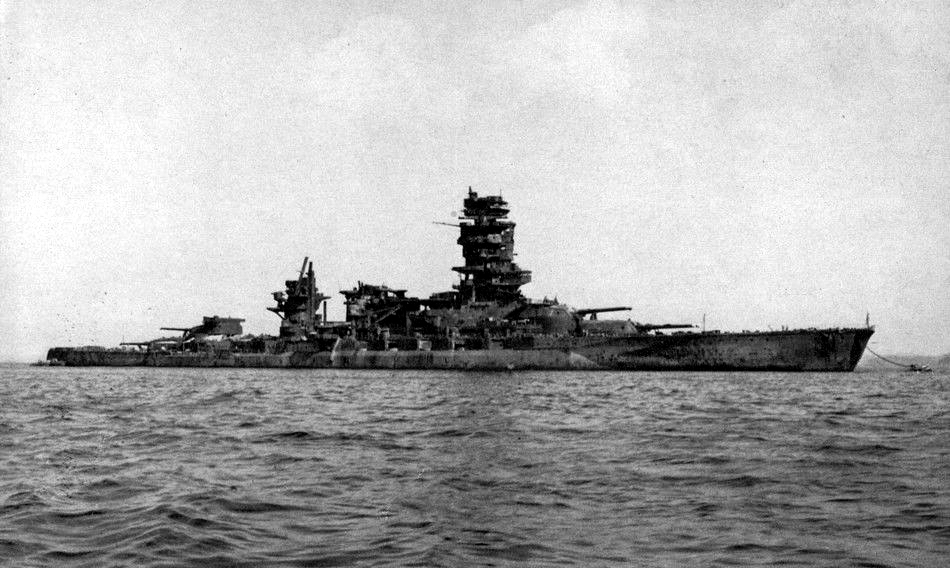
Nagato at Yokosuka, September 1945

Captain Shuichi Sugino was appointed as Nagato's new captain on 24 July, but he was unable to take up his appointment until 20 August. Retired Rear Admiral Masamichi Ikeguchi was assigned as the ship's interim captain until Sugino arrived. The Yokosuka Naval District received an alarm on the night of 1/2 August that a large convoy was approaching Sagami Bay and Nagato was ordered to attack immediately. The ship was totally unprepared for any attack, but Ikeguchi began the necessary preparations. The water in the ballast compartments was pumped out and her crew began reloading the propellant charges for her 16-inch guns. The ship received more fuel from a barge later that morning, but no order to attack ever came as it had been a false alarm. Sailors from the battleship USS Iowa, Underwater Demolition Team 18, and the high-speed transport USS Horace A. Bass secured the battleship on 30 August after the occupation began and Captain Thomas J. Flynn, executive officer of the Iowa, assumed command. By the time the war ended, Nagato was the only Japanese battleship still afloat. She was stricken from the Navy List on 15 September.

== After the war ==
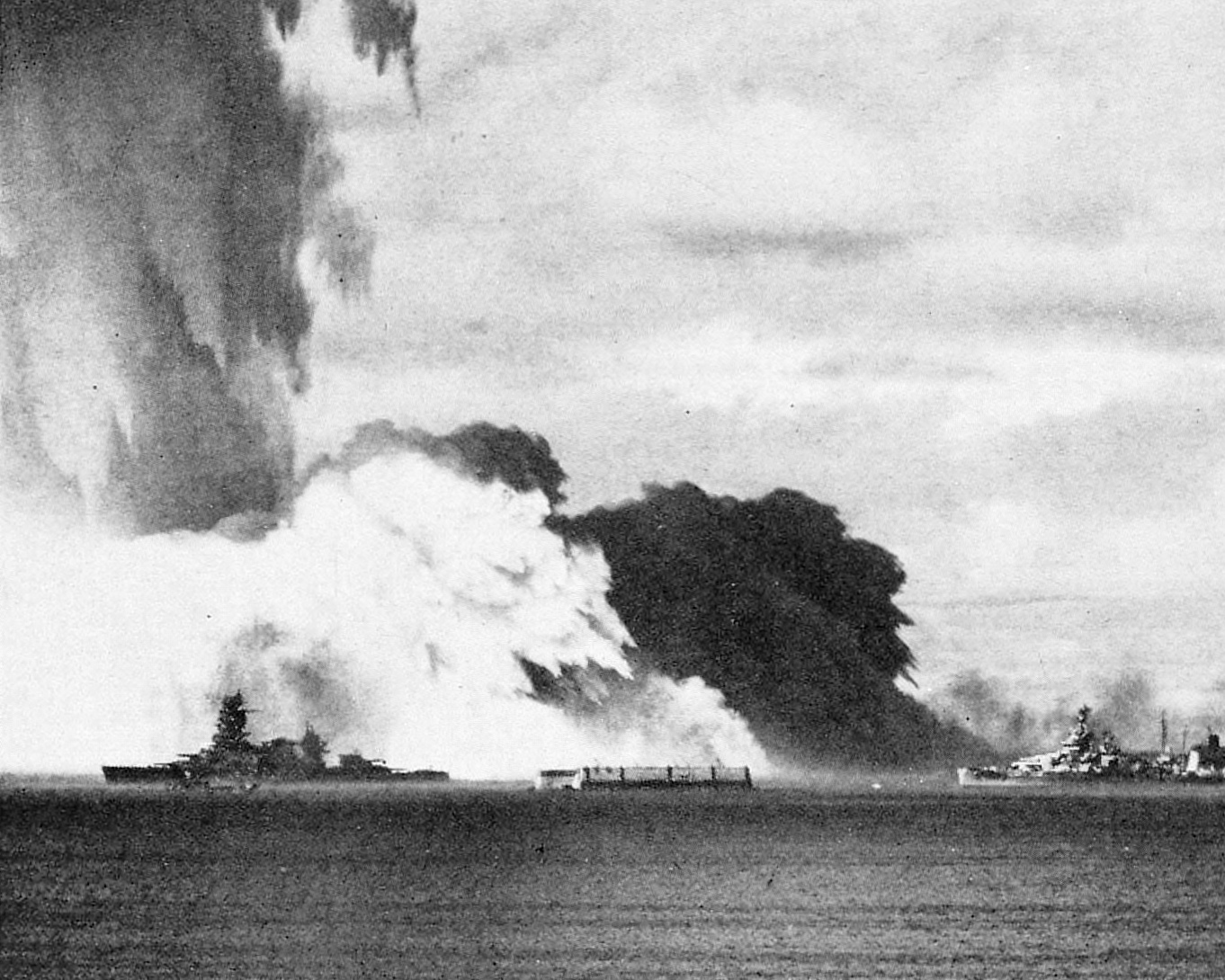
Nagato in foreground (left) at the beginning of the blast surge during the second atomic bomb test at Bikini Atoll

The ship was selected to participate as a target ship in Operation Crossroads, a series of nuclear weapon tests held at Bikini Atoll in mid-1946. In mid-March, Nagato departed Yokosuka for Eniwetok under the command of Captain W. J. Whipple, with an American crew of about 180 men supplementing her Japanese crew. The ship was only capable of a speed of 10 knots (19 km/h; 12 mph) from her two operating propeller shafts. Her hull had not been repaired from the underwater damage sustained during the attack on 18 July 1945, and she leaked enough that her pumps could not keep up. Her consort, the light cruiser Sakawa, broke down on 28 March and Nagato attempted to take her in tow, but one of her boilers malfunctioned and the ship ran out of fuel in bad weather. The ship had a list of seven degrees to port by the time tugboats from Eniwetok arrived on 30 March. Towed at a speed of 1 knot (1.9 km/h; 1.2 mph), the ship reached Eniwetok on 4 April where she received temporary repairs. On her trip to Bikini in May, Nagato reached 13 knots (24 km/h; 15 mph).

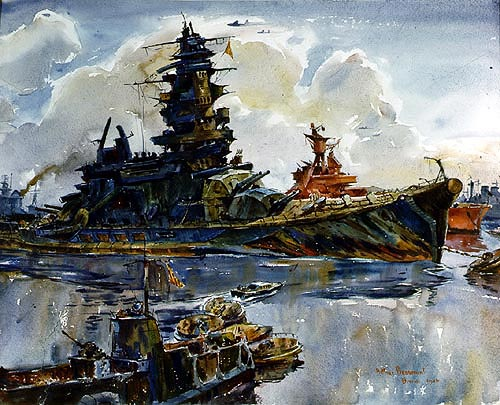
Painting of Nagato at Bikini Atoll after the Test Able explosion

Operation Crossroads began with the first blast (Test Able), an air burst on 1 July; she was 1,500 meters (1,640 yd) from ground zero and was only lightly damaged. A skeleton crew boarded Nagato to assess the damage and prepare her for the next test on 25 July. As a test, they operated one of her boilers for 36 hours without any problems. For Test Baker, an underwater explosion, the ship was positioned 870 meters (950 yd) from ground zero. Nagato rode out the tsunami from the explosion with little apparent damage; she had a slight starboard list of two degrees after the tsunami dissipated. A more thorough assessment could not be made because she was dangerously radioactive. Her list gradually increased over the next five days and she capsized and sank during the night of 29/30 July.

The wreck is upside down and her most prominent features are her four propellers, at a depth of 33.5 meters (110 ft) below the surface. She has become a scuba diving destination in recent years and The Times named Nagato as one of the top ten wreck diving sites in the world in 2007.
