= Japanese submarine Ha-104 =

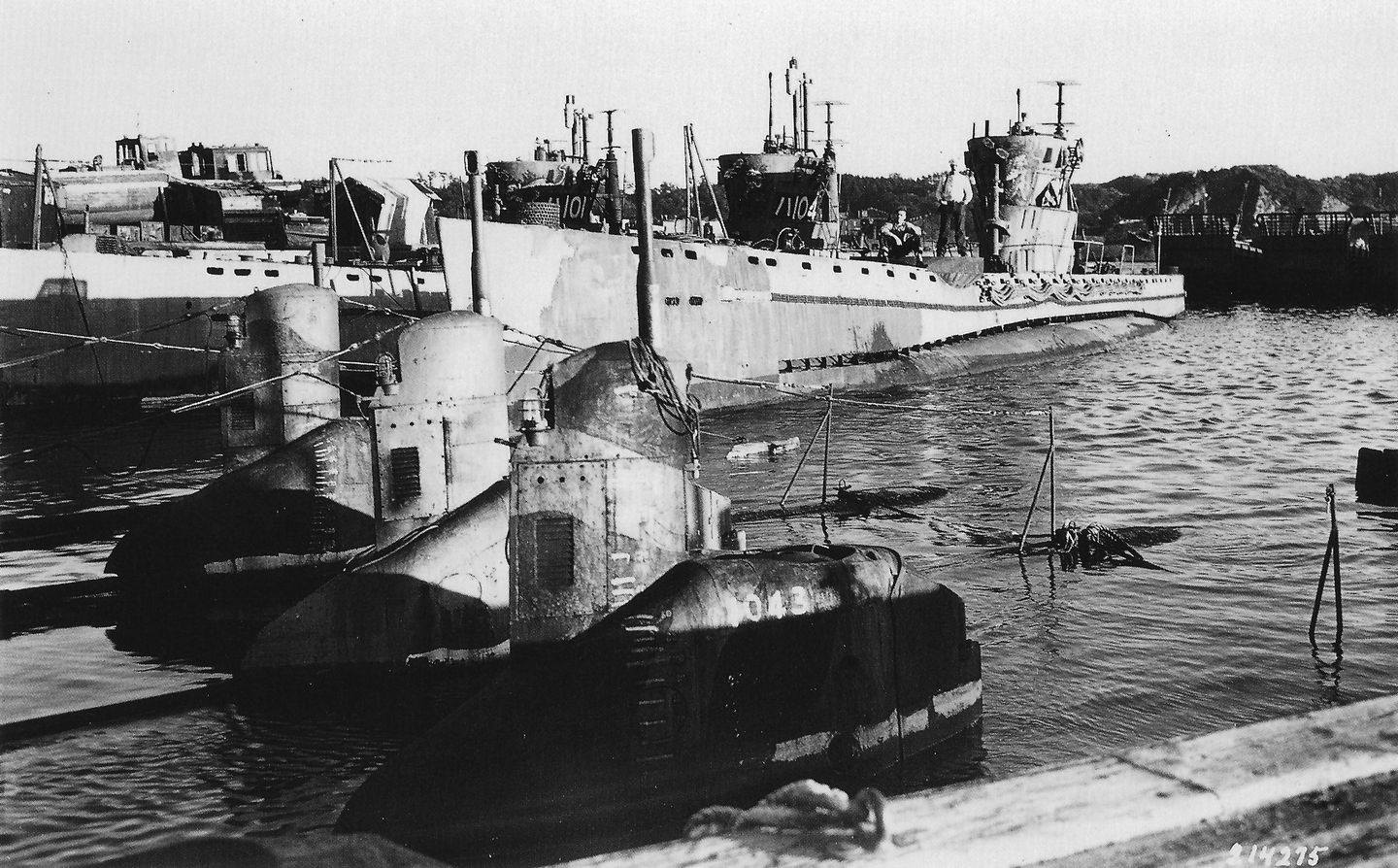
- Ha-104 (right) with Ha-101 (left) and Ha-102 (center) at Yokosuka, Japan, in 1945. Three midget submarines are in the foreground.

History

Japan
- Name: Small Supply Submarine No. 4604
- Builder: Kawasaki, Senshu and Kobe, Japan
- Laid down: 1 July 1944
- Launched: 30 September 1944
- Renamed: Ha-104 on 30 September 1944
- Completed: 1 December 1944
- Commissioned: 1 December 1944
- Fate: Surrendered 2 September 1945; Stricken 15 September 1945; Scuttled October 1945

General characteristics
- Type: Transport submarine
- Displacement: 436 t (429 long tons) surfaced; 501 t (493 long tons) submerged
- Length: 44.5 m (146 ft 0 in)
- Beam: 6.1 m (20 ft 0 in)
- Draft: 4.04 m (13 ft 3 in)
- Installed power: 400 bhp (300 kW) (diesels); 150 hp (110 kW) (electric motor)
- Propulsion: Diesel-electric; 1 × diesel engines; 1 × electric motor
- Speed: 10 knots (19 km/h; 12 mph) surfaced; 5 knots (9.3 km/h; 5.8 mph) submerged
- Range: 3,000 nmi (5,600 km; 3,500 mi) at 10 knots (19 km/h; 12 mph) surfaced; 46 nmi (85 km; 53 mi) at 2.3 knots (4.3 km/h; 2.6 mph) submerged
- Test depth: 100 meters (328 ft)
- Capacity: 60 metric tons (59 long tons)
- Complement: 22
- Armament: 1 × single 25 mm (1 in) Type 96 anti-aircraft gun

Ha-104 was an Imperial Japanese Navy Ha-101-class submarine. Completed and commissioned in December 1944, she served during the final months of World War II, making two supply voyages. She surrendered at the end of the war in September 1945 and was scuttled in October 1945.

== Design and description ==
The Ha-101-class submarines were designed as small, cheap transport submarines to resupply isolated island garrisons. They displaced 436 metric tons (429 long tons) surfaced and 501 metric tons (493 long tons) submerged. The submarines were 44.5 meters (146 ft 0 in) long, had a beam of 6.1 meters (20 ft 0 in) and a draft of 4.04 meters (13 ft 3 in). They were designed to carry 60 metric tons (59 long tons) of cargo.

For surface running, the boats were powered by a single 400-brake-horsepower (298 kW) diesel engine that drove one propeller shaft. When submerged the propeller was driven by a 140-horsepower (104 kW) electric motor. They could reach 10 knots (19 km/h; 12 mph) on the surface and 5 knots (9.3 km/h; 5.8 mph) underwater. On the surface, the Ha-101s had a range of 3,000 nautical miles (5,600 km; 3,500 mi) at 10 knots (19 km/h; 12 mph); submerged, they had a range of 46 nmi (85 km; 53 mi) at 2.3 knots (4.3 km/h; 2.6 mph). The boats were armed a single mount for a 25 mm (1 in) Type 96 anti-aircraft gun.

== Construction and commissioning ==
Ha-104 was laid down on 1 July 1944 by Kawasaki at Senshu, Japan, as Small Supply Submarine No. 4604. She was launched on 30 September 1944 and was named Ha-104 that day. She subsequently was towed to the Kawasaki shipyard at Kobe for fitting-out. She was completed and commissioned at Kobe on 1 December 1944.

== Service history ==
Upon commissioning, Ha-104 was assigned to Submarine Squadron 11 for workups. In mid-January 1945 she conducted workups with her sister ships Ha-101 and Ha-102 in the Iyo Nada in the Seto Inland Sea. She was reassigned to Submarine Squadron 7 in the 6th Fleet on 5 February 1945 and in mid-February 1945 departed Yokosuka, Japan, to take part in exercises.

Submarine Squadron 7 was disbanded on 20 March 1945, and Ha-101 was reassigned that day to Submarine Division 16 for supply operations. In late April 1945, she began preparations for a supply run to Marcus Island. On 8 May 1945, the Japanese garrison on Marcus Island transmitted a message warning that United States Army Air Forces B-24 Liberator bombers had recently attacked the island and that United States Navy submarines were patrolling in nearby waters. On 10 May 1945, Ha-104 departed Yokosuka bound for Marcus, arriving there on 13 May 1945. After unloading her cargo and bringing aboard mail and the cremated remains of 90 deceased Imperial Japanese Army soldiers for transportation to Japan, she got back underway the same day for the return voyage. Escorted along the way by submarine chasers and Imperial Japanese Navy Air Service aircraft, she returned to Yokosuka on 1 June 1945. After arriving at Yokosuka, she began a conversion to allow her to carry aviation gasoline.

On 26 June 1945, Ha-104 departed Yokosuka for her second supply run to Marcus Island. During July, she arrived at Marcus, discharged her cargo, and returned to Yokosuka.

Hostilities between Japan and the Allies ended on 15 August 1945, and on 2 September 1945, Ha-104 surrendered to the Allies at Yokosuka. The Japanese struck her from the Navy list on 15 September 1945. She was scuttled off Shimizu in October 1945.
