= Japanese submarine Ha-102 =

Japanese submarine

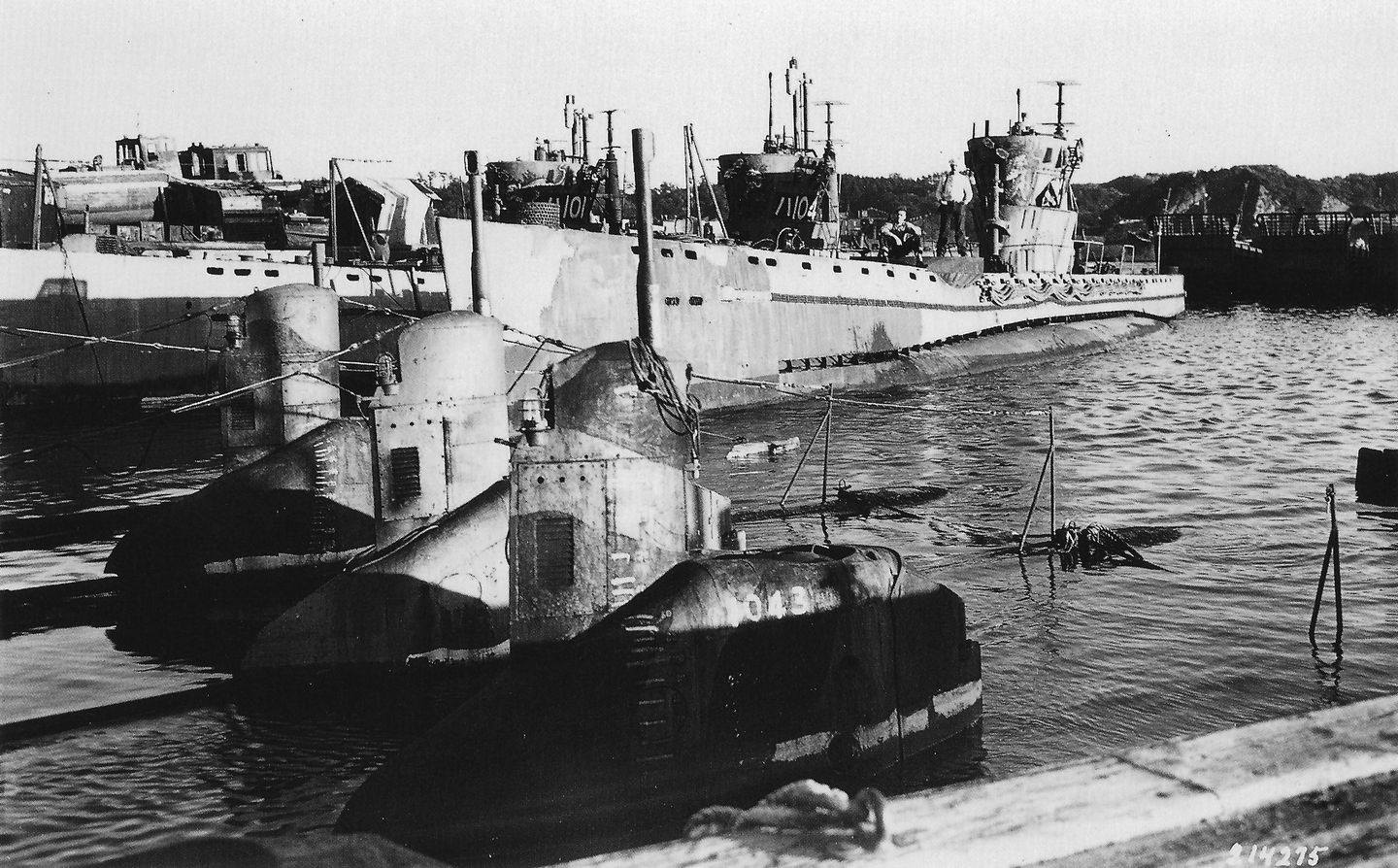
- Ha-102 (center) with Ha-101 (left) and Ha-104 (right) at Yokosuka, Japan, in 1945. Three midget submarines are in the foreground.

History

Japan
- Name: Small Supply Submarine No. 4601
- Builder: Kawasaki, Senshu and Kobe, Japan
- Laid down: 8 June 1944
- Launched: 22 August 1944
- Renamed: Ha-102 on 22 August 1944
- Completed: 6 December 1944
- Commissioned: 6 December 1944
- Fate: Surrendered 2 September 1945; Stricken 15 September 1945; Scrapped or scuttled October 1945 (see text)

General characteristics
- Type: Transport submarine
- Displacement: 436 t (429 long tons) surfaced; 501 t (493 long tons) submerged
- Length: 44.5 m (146 ft 0 in)
- Beam: 6.1 m (20 ft 0 in)
- Draft: 4.04 m (13 ft 3 in)
- Installed power: 400 bhp (300 kW) (diesels); 150 hp (110 kW) (electric motor)
- Propulsion: Diesel-electric; 1 × diesel engines; 1 × electric motor
- Speed: 10 knots (19 km/h; 12 mph) surfaced; 5 knots (9.3 km/h; 5.8 mph) submerged
- Range: 3,000 nmi (5,600 km; 3,500 mi) at 10 knots (19 km/h; 12 mph) surfaced; 46 nmi (85 km; 53 mi) at 2.3 knots (4.3 km/h; 2.6 mph) submerged
- Test depth: 100 meters (328 ft)
- Capacity: 60 metric tons (59 long tons)
- Complement: 22
- Armament: 1 × single 25 mm (1 in) Type 96 anti-aircraft gun

Ha-102 was an Imperial Japanese Navy Ha-101-class submarine. Completed and commissioned in December 1944, she served during the final months of World War II, making two supply runs. She surrendered at the end of the war in September 1945 and was disposed of in October 1945.

== Design and description ==
The Ha-101-class submarines were designed as small, cheap transport submarines to resupply isolated island garrisons. They displaced 436 metric tons (429 long tons) surfaced and 501 metric tons (493 long tons) submerged. The submarines were 44.5 meters (146 ft 0 in) long, had a beam of 6.1 meters (20 ft 0 in) and a draft of 4.04 meters (13 ft 3 in). They were designed to carry 60 metric tons (59 long tons) of cargo.

For surface running, the boats were powered by a single 400-brake-horsepower (298 kW) diesel engine that drove one propeller shaft. When submerged the propeller was driven by a 140-horsepower (104 kW) electric motor. They could reach 10 knots (19 km/h; 12 mph) on the surface and 5 knots (9.3 km/h; 5.8 mph) underwater. On the surface, the Ha-101s had a range of 3,000 nautical miles (5,600 km; 3,500 mi) at 10 knots (19 km/h; 12 mph); submerged, they had a range of 46 nmi (85 km; 53 mi) at 2.3 knots (4.3 km/h; 2.6 mph). The boats were armed a single mount for a 25 mm (1 in) Type 96 anti-aircraft gun.

== Construction and commissioning ==
Ha-102 was laid down on 8 June 1944 by Mitsubishi at Kobe, Japan, as Small Supply Submarine No. 4602. She was launched on 22 August 1944 and was named Ha-102 that day. She subsequently was towed to the Kawasaki shipyard at Kobe for fitting-out. She was completed and commissioned at Kobe on 6 December 1944.

== Service history ==
Upon commissioning, Ha-102 was assigned to Submarine Squadron 11 for workups. In mid-January 1945 she conducted workups with her sister ships Ha-101 and Ha-104 in the Iyo Nada in the Seto Inland Sea. She was reassigned to Submarine Squadron 7 in the 6th Fleet on 10 February 1945 and in mid-February 1945 departed Yokosuka, Japan, to take part in a series of exercises with Ha-101.

Submarine Squadron 7 was disbanded on 20 March 1945, and Ha-101 was reassigned that day to Submarine Division 16 for supply operations. On 5 April 1945, she got underway from Yokosuka to make her first supply run, a voyage to Marcus Island, which she reached in mid-April 1945. After unloading her cargo, she headed back to Yokosuka, arriving there in late April 1945. She set out from Yokosuka in late June 1945 for her second supply run to Marcus Island. She arrived at Marcus on 7 July 1945, discharged her cargo, and got back underway the same day, returning to Yokosuka on 16 July 1945. She then began a conversion to carry aviation gasoline.

Hostilities between Japan and the Allies ended on 15 August 1945, and on 2 September 1945, Ha-102 surrendered to the Allies at Yokosuka. The Japanese struck her from the Navy list on 15 September 1945. She was disposed of in Japan in October 1945; historians disagree on whether she was scrapped at Uraga Dockyard in Uraga or scuttled off Shimizu that month.
