= List of ships of World War II (I) =

The List of ships of the Second World War contains major military vessels of the war, arranged alphabetically and by type. The list includes armed vessels that served during the war and in the immediate aftermath, inclusive of localized ongoing combat operations, garrison surrenders, post-surrender occupation, colony re-occupation, troop and prisoner repatriation, to the end of 1945. For smaller vessels, see also list of World War II ships of less than 1000 tons. Some uncompleted Axis ships are included, out of historic interest. Ships are designated to the country under which they operated for the longest period of the Second World War, regardless of where they were built or previous service history. Submarines show submerged displacement.

Click on headers to sort column alphabetically.

List of ships of World War II (I)
Ship	Country or organization	Class	Type	Displacement (tons)	First commissioned	Fate
I-1	Imperial Japanese Navy	Junsen I Type	cruiser submarine	2,791	10 March 1926	wrecked 29 January 1943
I-2	Imperial Japanese Navy	Junsen I Type	cruiser submarine	2,791	24 July 1926	sunk 7 April 1944
I-3	Imperial Japanese Navy	Junsen I Type	cruiser submarine	2,791	30 November 1926	sunk 9 December 1942
I-4	Imperial Japanese Navy	Junsen I Type	cruiser submarine	2,791	24 December 1929	sunk 21 December 1942
I-5	Imperial Japanese Navy	Junsen I Type Modified	cruiser submarine	2,921	31 July 1932	sunk 19 July 1944
I-6	Imperial Japanese Navy	Junsen II Type	cruiser submarine	2,921	15 May 1935	sunk 16 June 1944
I-7	Imperial Japanese Navy	Junsen III Type	cruiser submarine	3,583	31 March 1937	wrecked 22 June 1943
I-8	Imperial Japanese Navy	Junsen III Type	cruiser submarine	3,583	5 December 1938	sunk 31 March 1945
I-9	Imperial Japanese Navy	Junsen Type A	cruiser submarine	4,129	13 February 1941	sunk 13 June 1943
I-10	Imperial Japanese Navy	Junsen Type A	cruiser submarine	4,129	31 October 1941	sunk 4 July 1944
I-11	Imperial Japanese Navy	Junsen Type A	cruiser submarine	4,129	16 May 1942	missing after 11 January 1944
I-12	Imperial Japanese Navy	Junsen Type A Modified 1	cruiser submarine	4,150	25 May 1944	sunk 13 November 1944
I-13	Imperial Japanese Navy	Junsen Type A Modified 2	cruiser submarine	4,762	16 December 1944	sunk 16 July 1945
I-14	Imperial Japanese Navy	Junsen Type A Modified 2	cruiser submarine	4,762	14 March 1945	sunk as target 28 May 1946
I-15	Imperial Japanese Navy	Junsen Type B	cruiser submarine	3,654	30 September 1940	sunk 10 November 1942
I-16	Imperial Japanese Navy	Junsen Type C	cruiser submarine	3,561	30 March 1940	sunk 19 May 1944
I-17	Imperial Japanese Navy	Junsen Type B	cruiser submarine	3,654	24 January 1941	sunk 19 August 1943
I-18	Imperial Japanese Navy	Junsen Type C	cruiser submarine	3,561	31 January 1941	sunk 11 February 1943
I-19	Imperial Japanese Navy	Junsen Type B	cruiser submarine	3,654	28 April 1941	sunk 25 November 1943
I-20	Imperial Japanese Navy	Junsen Type C	cruiser submarine	3,561	26 September 1940	missing after 31 August 1943
I-21	Imperial Japanese Navy	Junsen Type B	cruiser submarine	3,654	15 July 1941	sunk 29 November 1943
I-22	Imperial Japanese Navy	Junsen Type C	cruiser submarine	3,561	10 March 1941	sunk 6 October 1942
I-23	Imperial Japanese Navy	Junsen Type B	cruiser submarine	3,654	27 September 1941	missing after 24 February 1942
I-24	Imperial Japanese Navy	Junsen Type C	cruiser submarine	3,561	31 October 1941	sunk 1 June 1943
I-25	Imperial Japanese Navy	Junsen Type B	cruiser submarine	3,654	15 October 1941	sunk 3 September 1943
I-26	Imperial Japanese Navy	Junsen Type B	cruiser submarine	3,654	6 November 1941	sunk 26 October 1944
I-27	Imperial Japanese Navy	Junsen Type B	cruiser submarine	3,654	24 February 1942	sunk 12 February 1944
I-28	Imperial Japanese Navy	Junsen Type B	cruiser submarine	3,654	6 February 1942	sunk 17 May 1942
I-29	Imperial Japanese Navy	Junsen Type B	cruiser submarine	3,654	27 February 1942	sunk 26 July 1944
I-30	Imperial Japanese Navy	Junsen Type B	cruiser submarine	3,654	28 February 1942	sunk 13 October 1942
I-31	Imperial Japanese Navy	Junsen Type B	cruiser submarine	3,654	30 May 1942	sunk 13 May 1943
I-32	Imperial Japanese Navy	Junsen Type B	cruiser submarine	3,654	26 April 1942	sunk 24 March 1944
I-33	Imperial Japanese Navy	Junsen Type B	cruiser submarine	3,654	26 April 1942	sank in diving accident 13 June 1944
I-34	Imperial Japanese Navy	Junsen Type B	cruiser submarine	3,654	31 August 1942	sunk 13 November 1943
I-35	Imperial Japanese Navy	Junsen Type B	cruiser submarine	3,654	31 August 1942	sunk 23 November 1943
I-36	Imperial Japanese Navy	Junsen Type B	cruiser submarine	3,654	30 September 1942	scuttled 1 April 1946
I-37	Imperial Japanese Navy	Junsen Type B	cruiser submarine	3,654	10 March 1943	sunk 19 November 1944
I-38	Imperial Japanese Navy	Junsen Type B	cruiser submarine	3,654	31 January 1943	sunk 13 November 1944
I-39	Imperial Japanese Navy	Junsen Type B	cruiser submarine	3,654	22 April 1943	missing after 25 November 1943
I-40	Imperial Japanese Navy	Junsen Type B Modified 1	cruiser submarine	3,700	31 July 1943	missing after 22 November 1943
I-41	Imperial Japanese Navy	Junsen Type B Modified 1	cruiser submarine	3,700	18 September 1943	sunk 18 November 1944
I-42	Imperial Japanese Navy	Junsen Type B Modified 1	cruiser submarine	3,700	3 November 1943	sunk 23 March 1944
I-43	Imperial Japanese Navy	Junsen Type B Modified 1	cruiser submarine	3,700	5 November 1943	sunk 15 February 1944
I-44	Imperial Japanese Navy	Junsen Type B Modified 1	cruiser submarine	3,700	31 January 1944	missing April 1945
I-45	Imperial Japanese Navy	Junsen Type B Modified 1	cruiser submarine	3,700	28 December 1943	sunk 29 October 1944
I-46	Imperial Japanese Navy	Junsen Type C	cruiser submarine	3,621	29 February 1944	missing October 1944
I-47	Imperial Japanese Navy	Junsen Type C	cruiser submarine	3,621	10 July 1944	scuttled 1 April 1946
I-48	Imperial Japanese Navy	Junsen Type C	cruiser submarine	3,621	5 September 1944	sunk 23 January 1945
I-52	Imperial Japanese Navy	Junsen Type C Modified	transport submarine	3,644	28 December 1943	sunk 24 June 1944
I-53	Imperial Japanese Navy	Junsen Type C Modified	cruiser submarine	3,644	20 February 1944	scuttled 1 April 1946
I-54	Imperial Japanese Navy	Junsen Type B Modified 2	cruiser submarine	3,747	31 March 1944	missing after 23 October 1944
I-55	Imperial Japanese Navy	Junsen Type C Modified	cruiser submarine	3,644	20 April 1944	missing after 13 July 1944
I-56	Imperial Japanese Navy	Junsen Type B Modified 2	cruiser submarine	3,747	8 June 1944	missing April 1945
I-58	Imperial Japanese Navy	Junsen Type B Modified 2	cruiser submarine	3,747	7 September 1944	scuttled 1 April 1946
I-60	Imperial Japanese Navy	Kaidai III type	cruiser submarine	2,300	24 December 1929	sunk 17 January 1942
I-64	Imperial Japanese Navy	Kaidai IV type	cruiser submarine	2,300	30 August 1930	sunk 17 May 1942
I-70	Imperial Japanese Navy	Kaidai VI type	cruiser submarine	2,440	9 November 1935	sunk 10 December 1941
I-73	Imperial Japanese Navy	Kaidai VI type	cruiser submarine	2,440	7 January 1937	sunk 27 January 1942
I-121 (ex-I-21)	Imperial Japanese Navy	Kiraisen type	minelayer submarine	1,768	31 March 1927	scuttled 30 April 1946
I-122 (ex-I-22)	Imperial Japanese Navy	Kiraisen type	minelayer submarine	1,768	28 October 1928	sunk 10 June 1945
I-123 (ex-I-23)	Imperial Japanese Navy	Kiraisen type	minelayer submarine	1,768	28 April 1928	sunk 29 August 1942
I-124 (ex-I-24)	Imperial Japanese Navy	Kiraisen type	minelayer submarine	1,768	10 December 1928	sunk 20 January 1942
I-152 (ex-I-52)	Imperial Japanese Navy	Kaidai II type	training submarine	2,500	1 November 1924	Scrapped 1946–1948
I-153 (ex-I-53)	Imperial Japanese Navy	Kaidai III type	submarine	2,300	30 March 1927	Scuttled May 1946
I-154 (ex-I-54)	Imperial Japanese Navy	Kaidai III type	submarine	2,300	15 December 1927	Scuttled May 1946
I-155 (ex-I-55)	Imperial Japanese Navy	Kaidai III type	submarine	2,300	5 September 1927	Scuttled 8 May 1946
I-156 (ex-I-56)	Imperial Japanese Navy	Kaidai III type	submarine	2,300	31 March 1929	Scuttled 1 April 1946
I-157 (ex-I-57)	Imperial Japanese Navy	Kaidai III type	submarine	2,300	15 May 1928	Scuttled 1 April 1946
I-158 (ex-I-58)	Imperial Japanese Navy	Kaidai III type	submarine	2,300	24 December 1929	Scuttled 1 April 1946
I-159 (ex-I-59)	Imperial Japanese Navy	Kaidai III type	submarine	2,300	31 March 1930	Scuttled 1 April 1946
I-162 (ex-I-62)	Imperial Japanese Navy	Kaidai IV type	submarine	2,300	24 April 1930	Scuttled 1 April 1946
I-165 (ex-I-65)	Imperial Japanese Navy	Kaidai V type	submarine	2,330	1 December 1932	Sunk 27 June 1945
I-166 (ex-I-66)	Imperial Japanese Navy	Kaidai V type	submarine	2,330	10 November 1932	Sunk 17 July 1944
I-168 (ex-I-68)	Imperial Japanese Navy	Kaidai VI type	submarine	2,440	31 July 1934	Sunk 27 July 1943
I-169 (ex-I-69)	Imperial Japanese Navy	Kaidai VI type	submarine	2,440	28 September 1935	Sank in diving accident 4 April 1944
I-171 (ex-I-71)	Imperial Japanese Navy	Kaidai VI type	submarine	2,440	24 December 1935	Sunk 1 February 1944
I-172 (ex-I-72)	Imperial Japanese Navy	Kaidai VI type	submarine	2,440	7 January 1937	Sunk October–November 1942
I-174 (ex-I-74)	Imperial Japanese Navy	Kaidai VI type	submarine	2,440	15 August 1938	Sunk 12 April 1944
I-175 (ex-I-75)	Imperial Japanese Navy	Kaidai VI type	submarine	2,440	8 December 1938	Sunk 4 February 1944
I-176	Imperial Japanese Navy	Kaidai VII type	submarine	2,602	4 August 1942	Sunk 16 May 1944
I-177	Imperial Japanese Navy	Kaidai VII type	submarine	2,602	28 December 1942	Sunk 3 October 1944
I-178	Imperial Japanese Navy	Kaidai VII type	submarine	2,602	26 December 1942	Missing June 1943
I-179	Imperial Japanese Navy	Kaidai VII type	submarine	2,602	18 June 1943	Sank accidentally 14 July 1944
I-180	Imperial Japanese Navy	Kaidai VII type	submarine	2,602	15 January 1943	Sunk 27 April 1944
I-181	Imperial Japanese Navy	Kaidai VII type	submarine	2,602	24 May 1943	Wrecked 16 January 1944
I-182	Imperial Japanese Navy	Kaidai VII type	submarine	2,602	10 May 1943	Sunk 1 September 1944
I-183	Imperial Japanese Navy	Kaidai VII type	submarine	2,602	3 October 1943	Sunk 29 April 1944
I-184	Imperial Japanese Navy	Kaidai VII type	submarine	2,602	15 October 1943	Sunk 19 June 1944
I-185	Imperial Japanese Navy	Kaidai VII type	submarine	2,602	23 September 1943	Sunk 22 June 1944
I-201	Imperial Japanese Navy	Sentaka-Dai type	submarine	1,479	2 February 1945	sunk as target 23 May 1946
I-202	Imperial Japanese Navy	Sentaka-Dai type	submarine	1,479	12 February 1945	scuttled 5 April 1946
I-203	Imperial Japanese Navy	Sentaka-Dai type	submarine	1,479	29 May 1945	sunk as target 21 May 1946
I-351	Imperial Japanese Navy	Senho type	submarine tanker	4,290	28 January 1945	sunk 14 July 1945
I-361	Imperial Japanese Navy	Type-D/Sen'yu-Dai type	transport submarine	2,215	25 May 1944	sunk 31 May 1945
I-362	Imperial Japanese Navy	Type-D/Sen'yu-Dai type	transport submarine	2,215	23 May 1944	sunk 14 January 1945
I-363	Imperial Japanese Navy	Type-D/Sen'yu-Dai type	transport submarine	2,215	8 July 1944	sunk 29 October 1945
I-364	Imperial Japanese Navy	Type-D/Sen'yu-Dai type	transport submarine	2,215	14 June 1944	sunk 16 September 1944
I-365	Imperial Japanese Navy	Type-D/Sen'yu-Dai type	transport submarine	2,215	1 August 1944	sunk 29 November 1944
I-366	Imperial Japanese Navy	Type-D/Sen'yu-Dai type	transport submarine	2,215	15 August 1944	scuttled 1 April 1946
I-367	Imperial Japanese Navy	Type-D/Sen'yu-Dai type	transport submarine	2,215	3 August 1944	scuttled 1 April 1946
I-368	Imperial Japanese Navy	Type-D/Sen'yu-Dai type	transport submarine	2,215	25 August 1944	sunk 26 February 1945
I-369	Imperial Japanese Navy	Type-D/Sen'yu-Dai type	transport submarine	2,215	9 October 1944	scrapped 1946
I-370	Imperial Japanese Navy	Type-D/Sen'yu-Dai type	transport submarine	2,215	4 September 1944	sunk 26 February 1945
I-371	Imperial Japanese Navy	Type-D/Sen'yu-Dai type	transport submarine	2,215	2 October 1944	missing February 1945
I-372	Imperial Japanese Navy	Type-D/Sen'yu-Dai Modified type	transport submarine	2,215	8 November 1944	sunk 18 July 1945
I-373	Imperial Japanese Navy	Type D Modified	transport/tanker submarine	2,240	14 April 1945	sunk 14 August 1945
I-400	Imperial Japanese Navy	Sentoku type	submarine aircraft carrier	6,560	30 December 1944	sunk as target 4 June 1946
I-401	Imperial Japanese Navy	Sentoku type	submarine aircraft carrier	6,560	8 January 1945	sunk as target 31 May 1946
I-402	Imperial Japanese Navy	Sentoku type	submarine aircraft carrier	6,560	24 July 1945	scuttled 1 April 1946
I-501 (ex-U-181)	Imperial Japanese Navy	Type IXD2	submarine	1,771	16 July 1945	Scuttled 12 February 1946
I-502 (ex-U-862)	Imperial Japanese Navy	Type IXD2	submarine	1,771	15 July 1945	Scuttled 13 February 1946
I-503 (ex-Comandante Cappellini, ex-UIT-24)	Imperial Japanese Navy	Marcello-class	submarine	1,313	10 May 1945	Scuttled 16 April 1946
I-504 (ex-Luigi Torelli, ex-UIT-25)	Imperial Japanese Navy	Marconi-class	submarine	1,400	10 May 1945	Scuttled 16 April 1946
I-505 (ex-U-219)	Imperial Japanese Navy	Type X	minelayer submarine	2,143	15 July 1945	Scuttled 3 February 1946
I-506 (ex-U-195)	Imperial Japanese Navy	Type IXD1	submarine	1,771	15 July 1945	Scuttled 15 February 1946
Icarus	Royal Navy	I	minelayer destroyer	1,370	3 May 1937	paid off 29 August 1946, scrapped 29 October 1946.
Ierax	Hellenic Navy	Aetos	destroyer	1,030	19 October 1912	Decommissioned 1946
Ilex	Royal Navy	I	minelayer destroyer	1,370	7 July 1937	paid off August, scrapped in Sicily 1948.
Illustrious	Royal Navy	Illustrious	aircraft carrier	23,000	25 May 1940	scrapped 1956
Ilmarinen	Finland	Väinämöinen	coastal defence ship	3,900	17 April 1934	sunk 13 September 1941
Iltis	Kriegsmarine	Raubtier	torpedo boat	1,320	1 October 1928	sunk 13 May 1942
Imogen	Royal Navy	I	minelayer destroyer	1,370	2 June 1937	sunk in collision 16 July 1940
Imperial	Royal Navy	I	minelayer destroyer	1,370	30 June 1937	sunk 29 May 1941
Implacable	Royal Navy	Implacable	aircraft carrier	23,825	28 August 1944	scrapped 1955
Impulsive	Royal Navy	I	minelayer destroyer	1,370	29 January 1938	paid off 1946, scrapped 22 January 1946.
Inch Arran	Royal Canadian Navy	River	frigate	1,445	18 November 1944	paid off 23 June 1965
Indefatigable	Royal Navy	Implacable	aircraft carrier	23,825	3 May 1944	scrapped 1956
Independence	United States Navy	Independence	light aircraft carrier	11,000	14 January 1943	decommissioned 28 August 1946, target ship scuttled 1951
Independencia	Argentine Navy	Libertad	riverine battleship	2,336	5 March 1892	Stricken 1951
Indiana	United States Navy	South Dakota	battleship	35,000	30 April 1942	decommissioned 11 September 1947, scrapped 1963
Indianapolis	United States Navy	Portland	heavy cruiser	9,800	15 November 1932	sunk 30 July 1945
Indomitable	Royal Navy	Illustrious	aircraft carrier	23,000	10 October 1941	scrapped 1955
Indus	Royal Indian Navy	Grimsby	sloop	1,210	15 March 1935	sunk 6 April 1942
Inglefield	Royal Navy	I	minelayer destroyer	1,370	25 June 1937	sunk 25 February 1944
Ingolf	Royal Danish Navy		patrol boat	1,180	1934	seized by Germany in August 1943, renamed Sleipner, later sunk in air raid
Ingraham	United States Navy	Gleaves	destroyer	1,630	19 July 1941	sunk 22 August 1942
Intensity	United States Navy	Flower modified	corvette	1,015	31 March 1943	paid off 3 October 1945
Intrepid	United States Navy	Essex	aircraft carrier	27,100	16 August 1943	decommissioned 15 March 1974, museum ship
Intrepid	Royal Navy	I	minelayer destroyer	1,370	29 July 1937	sunk 26 September 1943
Investigator	Indian Navy		survey ship	1,572		decommissioned 1951, scrapped
Iowa	United States Navy	Iowa	battleship	45,000	22 February 1943	decommissioned 1990, museum
Irene Forsyte	United States Navy		Q-ship	283	26 August 1943	16 December 1943
Iroquois	Royal Canadian Navy	Tribal	destroyer	2,020	30 November 1942	paid off 24 October 1962, scrapped 1966
Isaac Sweers	Royal Netherlands Navy	Gerard Callenburgh	destroyer	1,606	29 May 1941	Sunk 13 November 1942
Ise	Imperial Japanese Navy	Ise	dreadnought	36,000	1917	sunk 28 July 1945
Isis	Royal Navy	I	minelayer destroyer	1,370	2 June 1937	sunk 20 July 1944.
Isuzu	Imperial Japanese Navy	Nagara	light cruiser	5,088	15 August 1923	Sunk 7 April 1945
Ivanhoe	Royal Navy	I	minelayer destroyer	1,370	24 August 1937	sunk 1 September 1940
Ivy	Royal Navy	Flower	corvette	925		
Iwate	Imperial Japanese Navy	Izumo	armored cruiser	9,750	18 March 1901	sunk 26 July 1945
Izumo	Imperial Japanese Navy	Izumo	armored cruiser	9,750	25 September 1900	sunk 24 July 1945
