= Japanese submarine I-367 =

1st class submarine of the Imperial Japanese Navy

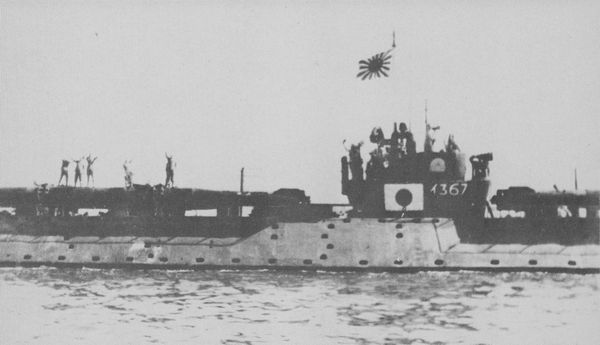
- I-367 at Otsujima on 19 July 1945 with kaitens on her deck.

History

Japan
- Name: Submarine No. 5467
- Builder: Mitsubishi, Kobe, Japan
- Laid down: 22 October 1943
- Launched: 28 April 1944
- Renamed: I-367
- Completed: 15 August 1944
- Commissioned: 15 August 1944
- Fate: Surrendered September 1945; Stricken 30 November 1945; Scuttled 1 April 1946

General characteristics
- Class & type: Type D1 submarine
- Displacement: 1,440 long tons (1,463 t) surfaced; 2,215 long tons (2,251 t) submerged
- Length: 73.50 m (241 ft 2 in) overall
- Beam: 8.90 m (29 ft 2 in)
- Draft: 4.76 m (15 ft 7 in)
- Propulsion: 2 × Kampon Mk.23B Model 8 diesels; 1,850 bhp surfaced; 1,200 shp submerged; 2 shafts
- Speed: 13.0 knots (24.1 km/h) surfaced; 6.5 knots (12.0 km/h) submerged
- Range: 15,000 nmi (28,000 km) at 10 knots (19 km/h) surfaced; 120 nmi (220 km) at 3 knots (5.6 km/h) submerged
- Test depth: 75 m (246 ft)
- Boats & landing craft carried: 2 x Daihatsu-class landing craft (removed January–April 1945)
- Capacity: 85 tons freight
- Complement: 55
- Sensors & processing systems: 1 × Type 22 surface search radar; 1 × Type 13 early warning radar
- Armament: 2 × 533 mm (21 in) torpedo tubes; 2 × Type 95 torpedoes; 1 × 14 cm/40 11th Year Type naval gun (removed January–April 1945); 2 × Type 96 25mm AA guns; 5 x Kaiten suicide attack torpedoes (added January–April 1945)

I-367 was an Imperial Japanese Navy Type D1 transport submarine. Completed and commissioned in August 1944, she served in World War II and conducted transport missions between Japan and outlying islands until she was converted into a kaiten suicide attack torpedo carrier. She survived the war, surrendered to Allied forces in 1945, and was scuttled in 1946.

== Construction and commissioning ==
I-367 was laid down on 22 October 1943 by Mitsubishi at Kobe, Japan, with the name Submarine No. 5467. She was renamed I-367 prior to completion. She was launched on 28 April 1944 and was completed and commissioned on 15 August 1944.Children's Day (Japan)

== Service history ==
Upon commissioning, I-367 was attached to the Sasebo Naval District and was assigned to Submarine Squadron 11 for workups. With her workups complete, she was reassigned to Submarine Squadron 7 on 15 October 1944, joining the submarines I-361, I-362, I-363, I-366, I-368, I-369, I-370, and I-371.

=== Transport missions ===
On 31 October 1944, I-367 departed Yokosuka bound for Marcus Island on her first transport mission, carrying 61 metric tons of food and ammunition. She arrived at Marcus Island on 6 November 1944 and returned to Yokosuka, which she reached on 12 November 1944. She departed Yokosuka on 4 December 1944 for her second transport voyage, heading for Wake Island with a cargo of 81 tons of food ammunition. She reached Wake on 17 December 1944, unloaded her cargo, got back underway, and returned to Yokosuka on 1 January 1945.

=== Kaiten carrier ===
Submarine Squadron 7 was deactivated on 20 March 1945 and I-367 was reassigned to Submarine Division 15. Meanwhile, after reaching Yokosuka she was converted at Yokosuka Navy Yard from a transport submarine into a kaiten suicide attack torpedo carrier, the conversion involving the removal of her 140-millimeter (5.5 in) deck gun and Daihatsu-class landing craft and their replacement with fittings allowing her to carry five kaitens on her deck. Her conversion was completed in late April 1945.

==== First kaiten mission ====
While I-367 was undergoing conversion, U.S. forces captured advanced bases and anchorages in the Kerama Islands southwest of Okinawa between 26 and 29 March 1945, and the Battle of Okinawa began when U.S. forces landed on Okinawa itself on 1 April 1945. I-366 and I-367 were designated the Shimbu ("God's Warriors") Kaiten Group, and on 1 May 1945 I-367 moved to the kaiten base at Otsujima to load kaitens so she could deploy to attack Allied ships supporting the fighting on Okinawa. Off Otsujima, she conducted kaiten exercises on 2 and 3 May and a test dive with kaitens aboard on 4 May 1945. On 5 May 1945 — Boys' Day in Japan — she got underway for a patrol area northwest of Saipan flying the traditional Boy's Day koinobori (carp streamer) from the radio antenna on her conning tower. I-366 suffered damage when she struck a magnetic mine off Hikari on 6 May 1945 and could not deploy, so I-367 became the only submarine to patrol as part of the Shimbu Group.

Between 15 and 19 May 1945 — during which she arrived in her patrol area southeast of Okidaitojima and 450 nautical miles (830 km; 520 mi) northwest of Saipan on 17 May 1945 — I-367 made sound contact on Allied vessels four times, but each time was unable to close for an attack. She was east of Okinawa on 27 May 1945 when she sighted a four-ship convoy made up of vessels of United States Navy Service Squadron 6. Three of I-367′s kaitens were defective — two with malfunctioning rudders and one with engine trouble — but from a position on the convoy's port beam, she launched her other two kaitens. The fleet tug USS Sioux (ATF-75) sank one of the kaitens with fire from a Bofors 40 mm gun. I-367 claimed two merchant ships sunk and some reports claimed that the destroyer escort USS Gilligan (DE-508) suffered damage in a kaiten attack on 27 May, but in fact the convoy suffered no damage from I-367′s attack and Gilligan′s damage was inflicted by a kamikaze.

I-367 set course for Japan, arriving at Otsujima on 4 June 1945 to disembark her remaining kaitens and kaiten pilots. She then proceeded to Kure, arriving there on 5 June 1945.

==== Second kaiten mission ====
On 19 July 1945, I-367 was part of the Tamon Kaiten Group along with the submarines I-47, I-53, I-58, I-363, and I-366. With five kaitens on board, she got underway from the kaiten base at Otsujima that day bound for a patrol area 400 nautical miles (740 km; 460 mi) southeast of Okinawa. She made no contacts during her patrol. She was off the Bungo Strait on her return voyage to Japan when she received word on 15 August 1945 that Emperor Hirohito had announced the end of hostilities between Japan and the Allies that day. She arrived at Otsujima later that day and disembarked her kaiten pilots, then headed for Kure, which she reached on 16 August 1945. She surrendered to the Allies in September 1945.

== Final disposition ==
I-367 moved from Kure to Sasebo, where she was stripped of all valuable materials and equipment. The Japanese struck her from the Navy list on 30 November 1945.

In Operation Road's End, the U.S. Navy submarine tender USS Nereus (AS-17) towed I-367 from Sasebo to an area off the Goto Islands on 1 April 1946. Her Japanese crew was taken off by 13:10. At 13:18, demolition charges aboard her exploded and she sank in 30 seconds, the second of a number of Japanese submarines scuttled in the area that day.

== Sources ==
- Hackett, Bob & Kingsepp, Sander. IJN Submarine I-367: Tabular Record of Movement. Retrieved on September 18, 2020.
