= Japanese submarine I-366 =

1944 Type D1 submarine

History

Japan
- Name: Submarine No. 5466
- Builder: Kure Naval Arsenal, Kure, Japan
- Laid down: 26 August 1943
- Launched: 9 March 1944
- Renamed: I-366 on 9 March 1944
- Completed: 3 August 1944
- Commissioned: 3 August 1944
- Fate: Surrendered September 1945; Stricken 30 November 1945; Scuttled 1 April 1946

General characteristics
- Class & type: Type D1 submarine
- Displacement: 1,440 long tons (1,463 t) surfaced; 2,215 long tons (2,251 t) submerged
- Length: 73.50 m (241 ft 2 in) overall
- Beam: 8.90 m (29 ft 2 in)
- Draft: 4.76 m (15 ft 7 in)
- Propulsion: 2 × Kampon Mk.23B Model 8 diesels; 1,850 bhp surfaced; 1,200 shp submerged; 2 shafts
- Speed: 13.0 knots (24.1 km/h) surfaced; 6.5 knots (12.0 km/h) submerged
- Range: 15,000 nmi (28,000 km) at 10 knots (19 km/h) surfaced; 120 nmi (220 km) at 3 knots (5.6 km/h) submerged
- Test depth: 75 m (246 ft)
- Boats & landing craft carried: 2 x Daihatsu-class landing craft (removed March–May 1945)
- Capacity: 85 tons freight
- Complement: 55
- Sensors & processing systems: 1 × Type 22 surface search radar; 1 × Type 13 early warning radar
- Armament: 1 × 14 cm/40 11th Year Type naval gun (removed March–May 1945); 2 × Type 96 25mm AA guns; 5 x Kaiten suicide attack torpedoes (added March–May 1945)

I-366 was an Imperial Japanese Navy Type D1 transport submarine. Completed and commissioned in August 1944, she served in World War II and conducted transport missions between Japan and outlying islands until she was converted into a kaiten suicide attack torpedo carrier. She survived the war, surrendered to Allied forces in 1945, and was scuttled in 1946.

== Construction and commissioning ==
I-366 was laid down on 26 August 1943 by Mitsubishi at Kobe, Japan, with the name Submarine No. 5466. She was launched on 9 March 1944 and was renamed I-366 that day. She was completed and commissioned on 3 August 1944.

== Service history ==
Upon commissioning, I-366 was attached to the Yokosuka Naval District and was assigned to Submarine Squadron 11 for workups in the Kobe area. She later moved to Kure where one of her diesel engines broke down in early September 1944. Repairs took until early October 1944. With her workups complete, she was reassigned to Submarine Squadron 7 on 2 October 1944, and she arrived at Yokosuka in early November 1944.

=== Transport missions ===
At 16:00 on 3 December 1944, I-366 departed Yokosuka bound for Pagan in the Mariana Islands on her first transport mission, carrying 51 metric tons of food and ammunition. Shortly after her departure, she encountered a storm, and lost several supply containers filled with rice on her afterdeck that were washed overboard. On 10 December 1944, she was on the surface recharging her batteries when she detected an aircraft and crash-dived, intending to dive to 130 feet (40 m), but a valve malfunctioned, causing her to descend to 290 feet (88 m) and develop a leak through her periscope shaft. She arrived at Pagan on the evening of 14 December 1944, transferred her cargo to Daihatsu-class landing craft, embarked 49 passengers, including some military pilots, and got back underway after only four hours. At least 10 of her passengers were wounded personnel, and six of them died during the voyage to Japan. She arrived at Yokosuka at 10:00 on 28 December 1944 and disembarked her 43 surviving passengers.

After arriving at Yokosuka, I-366 began a refit, during which a Type 13 air-search radar was installed. As of 1 January 1945, she was part of Submarine Squadron 7 along with the submarines I-361, I-362, I-363, I-367, I-368, I-369, I-370, and I-371.

With her overhaul complete, I-366 departed Yokosuka on 29 January 1945 for her second transport voyage, bound for Truk with a cargo of aviation gasoline and spare parts for the Nakajima C6N1 Saiun ("Iridiscent Cloud"; Allied reporting name "Myrt") reconnaissance aircraft of the 141st Naval Air Group, which needed the fuel and parts for reconnaissance flights over the United States Navy anchorage at Ulithi Atoll. Soon after departure, her crew discovered that her shortwave radio mast would not retract, so she returned to Yokosuka. With the mast repaired, she again put to sea that evening, spent the night of 29–30 January 1945 in the Tateyama Bight, and then set out into the Pacific Ocean. During her voyage, one of her lookouts reported sighting an Allied cruiser on southwesterly headed at 04:48 on 10 February 1945.

On 12 February 1945, I-366 arrived at Truk, where she unloaded 33 tons of fuel and some other cargo. She then headed for Mereyon Island at Woleai in the Caroline Islands, which she reached on 16 February 1945. She unloaded 51 tons of food and ammunition into nine Daihatsus, embarked 42 or 43 passengers (sources disagree), and got back underway, bound for Yokosuka. During her voyage, she sighted an Iwo Jima-bound Allied convoy in late February 1945. She arrived at Yokosuka on 3 March 1945.

=== Kaiten carrier ===
Submarine Squadron 7 was deactivated on 20 March 1945 and I-366 was reassigned to Submarine Division 15. Meanwhile, after reaching Yokosuka, I-366 was converted from a transport submarine into a kaiten suicide attack torpedo carrier, the conversion involving the removal of her 140-millimeter (5.5 in) deck gun and Daihatsu-class landing craft and their replacement with fittings allowing her to carry five kaitens on her deck. Unlike some of the other Type D1 submarines, she was not equipped with conventional torpedo tubes.

While I-366 was undergoing conversion, U.S. forces captured advanced bases and anchorages in the Kerama Islands southwest of Okinawa between 26 and 29 March 1945, and the Battle of Okinawa began when U.S. forces landed on Okinawa itself on 1 April 1945. With her conversion complete, I-366 and the submarine I-367 were designated the Shimbu ("God's Warriors") Kaiten Group, and on 2 May 1945 I-366 received orders to get underway on 4 May 1945 for the kaiten base at Hikari, where she was to load kaitens, and then deploy to the waters between Okinawa and Ulithi Atoll to attack Allied ships. While conducting kaiten launch exercises off Hikari on 6 May 1945, however, she detonated a magnetic mine at around 12:00, and the explosion damaged her propellers and stern planes. A tug from Hikari arrived and took her under tow. The damage prevented her from taking part in the Shimbu mission.

I-366 underwent repairs at the Kure Naval Arsenal in Kure. While she was under repair, a new radar was installed aboard her. By 20 July 1945, her repairs were complete and she was engaged in kaiten training.

By 1 August 1945, I-366 was part of the Tamon Kaiten Group along with the submarines I-47, I-53, I-58, I-363, and I-367. With five kaitens on board, she got underway from Hirao that day bound for a patrol area southeast of Okinawa.

On 11 August 1945, I-366 sighted an Allied convoy 500 nautical miles (930 km; 580 mi) north of Palau and attempted to launch all five of her kaitens. Two were defective, but she launched the other three at very long range. I-366 did not detect any hits, and her navigator opined that all three kaitens had run out of fuel before reaching the convoy and their pilots had suffocated. I-366 nonetheless claimed three Allied transports sunk in the attack, although postwar analysis assessed no damage to the convoy's ships.

I-366 set course for Japan. While she was en route, she received word on 15 August 1945 that Emperor Hirohito had announced the end of hostilities between Japan and the Allies that day. She arrived at Kure on 18 August 1945 and surrendered to the Allies in September 1945.

== Final disposition ==
In October 1945, I-366 moved from Kure to Sasebo, where she was stripped of all valuable materials and equipment. The Japanese struck her from the Navy list on 30 November 1945.

In Operation Road's End, the U.S. Navy submarine tender USS Nereus (AS-17) towed I-366 from Sasebo to an area off the Goto Islands on 1 April 1946, where she was among a number of Japanese submarines scuttled that day. Her Japanese crew was taken off by 13:39. At 13:50, a demolition charge in her stern compartment exploded and she began to sink slowly by the stern, her bow rising 15 feet (4.6 m) out of the water. At 13:52, a demolition charge in her bow detonated and I-366 blew up. Debris from I-366 landed over a wide area, and one of her torpedo tube doors missed Nereus′s motor launch, which was carrying some of I-366′s crew members, by only about 100 yards (91 m).

== Sources ==
- Hackett, Bob & Kingsepp, Sander. IJN Submarine I-366: Tabular Record of Movement. Retrieved on September 18, 2020.
