= I-361 =

I-361 may refer to:

- Japanese submarine I-361, an Imperial Japanese Navy submarine commissioned in 1944 and sunk in 1945
- Type D submarine, a class of Japanese submarines sometimes referred to as the I-361 class
