= Japanese submarine I-363 =

1st class submarine of the Imperial Japanese Navy

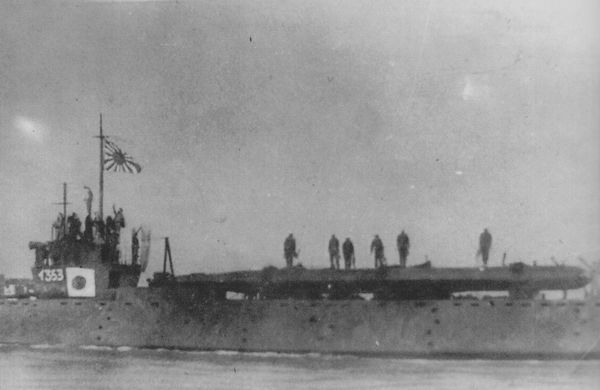
- I-363 with kaitens on her deck in either May or August 1945.

History

Japan
- Name: Submarine No. 5463
- Builder: Kure Navy Yard, Kure, Japan
- Laid down: 1 May 1943
- Renamed: I-363 on 20 October 1943
- Launched: 12 December 1943
- Completed: 8 July 1944
- Commissioned: 8 July 1944
- Fate: Surrendered 2 September 1945; Sunk 29 October 1945; Stricken 10 November 1945; Refloated 26 January 1966; Scrapped

General characteristics
- Class & type: Type D1 submarine
- Displacement: 1,440 long tons (1,463 t) surfaced; 2,215 long tons (2,251 t) submerged
- Length: 73.50 m (241 ft 2 in) overall
- Beam: 8.90 m (29 ft 2 in)
- Draft: 4.76 m (15 ft 7 in)
- Propulsion: 2 × Kampon Mk.23B Model 8 diesels; 1,850 bhp surfaced; 1,200 shp submerged; 2 shafts
- Speed: 13.0 knots (24.1 km/h) surfaced; 6.5 knots (12.0 km/h) submerged
- Range: 15,000 nmi (28,000 km) at 10 knots (19 km/h) surfaced; 120 nmi (220 km) at 3 knots (5.6 km/h) submerged
- Test depth: 75 m (246 ft)
- Boats & landing craft carried: 2 x Daihatsu-class landing craft (removed March–May 1945)
- Capacity: 85 tons freight
- Complement: 55
- Sensors & processing systems: 1 × Type 22 surface search radar; 1 × Type 13 early warning radar
- Armament: 2 × 533 mm (21 in) torpedo tubes; 2 × Type 95 torpedoes; 1 × 14 cm/40 11th Year Type naval gun (removed March–May 1945); 2 × Type 96 25mm AA guns; 5 x Kaiten suicide attack torpedoes (added March–May 1945)

I-363 was an Imperial Japanese Navy Type D1 transport submarine. Completed and commissioned in July 1944, she served in World War II and conducted transport missions between Japan and outlying islands until she was converted into a kaiten suicide attack torpedo carrier. She survived the war, but sank after striking a mine in the weeks immediately following its conclusion.

== Construction and commissioning ==
I-363 was laid down on 1 May 1943 by Kure Naval Arsenal at Kure, Japan, with the name Submarine No. 5463. She was renamed I-363 on 20 October 1943 and provisionally attached to the Yokosuka Naval District that day. She was launched on 12 December 1943 and was completed and commissioned on 8 July 1944.

== Service history ==
Upon commissioning, I-363 was attached formally to the Yokosuka Naval District and was assigned to Submarine Squadron 11 for workups. She departed Hikari on 8 August 1944. With her workups complete, she was reassigned to Submarine Squadron 7 on 15 September 1944.

=== Transport missions ===
On 9 October 1944, I-363 departed Yokosuka bound for Mereyon Island at Woleai in the Caroline Islands on her first transport mission, carrying 75 metric tons of food and supplies and 15 metric tons of other cargo. En route, he stopped at Truk from 21 to 24 October 1944, where she picked up another 10 metric tons of cargo for Mereyon consisting of food and uniforms. She arrived at Mereyon on 28 October 1944, unloaded five tons of fuel and supplies, embarked seven passengers, and got back underway the same day. She returned to Truk on 31 October 1944, unloaded 33 metric tons of fuel oil, embarked 83 Imperial Japanese Navy Air Service personnel, and put back to sea on 2 November 1944 bound for Yokosuka, which she reached on 15 November 1944. She got underway from Yokosuka on 30 November 1944 for a training exercise, but returned the same day after her commanding officer suffered an injury.

I-363 departed Yokosuka on 10 November 1944 for her second transport voyage carrying a cargo of 88 metric tons of food, 10 metric tons of ammunition, and 10 metric tons of other supplies, this time setting course for Marcus Island, which she reached on 17 November 1944. After unloading her cargo and embarking 60 passengers, she left the same day bound for Yokosuka, where she arrived on 26 December 1944. She then began an overhaul.

With the overhaul complete, I-363 put to sea from Yokosuka on 5 March 1945 for her third supply voyage, again bound for Marcus Island. She arrived at Marcus on 13 March 1945, unloaded her cargo, and headed back to Yokosuka. During her voyage, Submarine Squadron 7 was deactivated on 20 March 1945 and she was reassigned to Submarine Division 15. She reached Yokosuka on 30 March 1945.

=== Kaiten carrier ===
While I-363 was on her return voyage from Marcus Island, U.S. forces captured advanced bases and anchorages in the Kerama Islands southwest of Okinawa between 26 and 29 March 1945, and shortly after her arrival at Yokosuka, the Battle of Okinawa began when U.S. forces landed on Okinawa itself on 1 April 1945. After reaching Yokosuka, I-363 was converted from a transport submarine into a kaiten suicide attack torpedo carrier, the conversion involving the removal of her 140-millimeter (5.5 in) deck gun and Daihatsu-class landing craft and their replacement with fittings allowing her to carry five kaitens on her deck,

==== First kaiten mission ====
By 28 May 1945, I-363 was part of the Todoroki ("Thunderclap") Kaiten Group along with the submarines I-36, I-165, and I-361. With five kaitens on board, she got underway from the kaiten base at Hikari that day bound for a patrol area between Okinawa and Ulithi Atoll.

On 15 June 1945, I-363 sighted a convoy 500 nautical miles (930 km; 580 mi) southeast of Okinawa. With the seas too rough for her to launch her kaitens, she attacked with conventional torpedoes instead. Her commanding officer believed she sank one merchant ship, although in fact she inflicted no damage. On 18 June, she received orders to end her patrol and proceed to Hirao, Japan, which she reached on 28 June 1945. She moved on to Kure on 29 June 1945.

==== Second kaiten mission ====
Assigned to the Tamon Kaiten Group along with the submarines I-47, I-53, I-58, I-366, and I-367, I-363 departed Hikari on 8 August 1945, the last of the group's submarines to get underway. She was assigned a patrol area 500 nautical miles (930 km; 580 mi) north of Palau, but on 12 August 1945 received orders to instead patrol in the Sea of Japan to defend the Japanese archipelago against a possible Soviet invasion. She was on the surface northwest of Kyushu on 14 August 1945 when aircraft of United States Navy Task Force 38 strafed her, killing two members of her crew but inflicting only minor damage on her.

=== End of war ===
On 15 August 1945, while I-363 was at sea, World War II ended with the Hirohito surrender broadcast announcing the cessation of hostilities between Japan and the Allies. I-363 arrived at Kure on 18 August 1945 and surrendered to the Allies on 2 September 1945, the same day that Japan formally surrendered in a ceremony aboard the battleship USS Missouri (BB-63) in Tokyo Bay.

=== Loss ===
On 27 October 1945, I-363 got underway from Kure bound for Sasebo. She was off the coast of Miyazaki Prefecture on 29 October 1945 when she struck a mine that had been laid during World War II. She sank with the loss of 36 lives. There were 10 survivors. She was stricken from the Navy list on 10 November 1945.

== Final disposition ==
The Fukada Salvage Company refloated I-363's wreck on 26 January 1966. The wreck was scrapped at Etajima.

== Commemoration ==
I-363's periscope is on display at the I-363 memorial at the Nagasako Cemetery, a former Imperial Japanese Navy cemetery at Kure.

== Sources ==
- Hackett, Bob & Kingsepp, Sander. IJN Submarine I-363: Tabular Record of Movement. Retrieved on September 17, 2020.
