= Japanese stores ship Hokkai Maru (1934) =

Imperial Japanese Navy auxiliary stores ship

- Japanese auxiliary stores ship Hokkai Maru

History

Empire of Japan
- Name: Hokkai Maru
- Builder: Mitsubishi Zosen K.K., Kobe
- Laid down: 12 September 1933
- Launched: 15 March 1934
- Sponsored by: Nippon Suisan K.K.
- Completed: 15 May 1934
- Commissioned: requisitioned by the Imperial Japanese Navy, October 1937
- Stricken: 10 January 1944
- Home port: Tokyo
- Identification: 39090; Call sign: JRDJ
- Fate: Torpedoed and sunk, 22 November 1944

General characteristics
- Type: Stores ship
- Tonnage: 407 GRT
- Length: 45.6 m (149 ft 7 in) o/a
- Beam: 7.4 m (24 ft 3 in)
- Draught: 4.2 m (13 ft 9 in)
- Speed: 10 knots (19 km/h; 12 mph)

Hokkai Maru (Japanese: 北海丸) was an auxiliary stores ship of the Imperial Japanese Navy during World War II.

== History ==
Hokkai Maru was laid down on 12 September 1933 by Mitsubishi Zosen K.K. at their Kobe shipyard at the behest of the Nippon Suisan K.K. as a refrigerated deep sea trawler. Her sister trawlers became stores ships Tōkō Maru No. 2 Go and Hakurei Maru. She was launched on 15 March 1934 and completed on 15 May 1934. She was made of steel. She was a fishing trawler until she was requisitioned by the Imperial Japanese Navy in October 1937. Returned to her owners November–December 1938. Re-requisitioned in 1939. returned to her owners 23 May 1940. Re-requisitioned 7 August 1940.

On 7 May 1942 she rescued twenty three survivors from a raft from Auxiliary merchant cruiser Kinjosan Maru, torpedoed and sunk by USS Greenling on the 4th.

On 22 November 1944, she was attacked and sunk by torpedoes fired from the American submarine USS Scabbardfish at (33°20′N 142°00′E). She was struck from the Navy List on 10 January 1944.
