= Type D submarine =

Japanese naval ship class (1944–45)

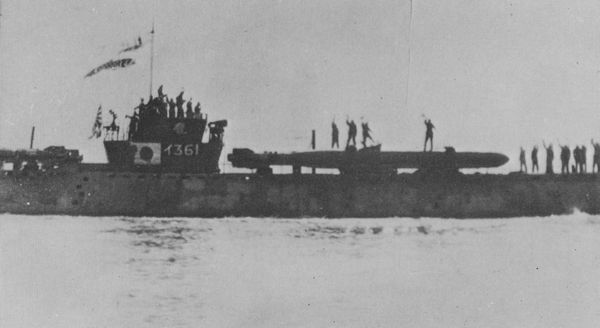
- I-361 on 23 May 1945

Class overview
- Name: Type D submarines
- Builders: Kure Naval Arsenal; Yokosuka Naval Arsenal; Mitsubishi Heavy Industries
- Operators: Imperial Japanese Navy
- Subclasses: I-361-class (Project Number S51); I-372-class (Project Number S51B); I-373-class (Project Number S51C)
- Cost: I-361-class; 9,426,000 JPY; I-372-class and I-373-class; 9,719,000 JPY
- Built: 1943–1945
- In commission: 1944–1945
- Planned: 18
- Completed: 13
- Canceled: 5
- Lost: 9 + 1 (After the end of the war)
- Retired: 3

General characteristics I-361 class (Type-D submarine)
- Type: Transport submarine
- Displacement: 1,440 long tons (1,463 t) surfaced; 2,215 long tons (2,251 t) submerged
- Length: 73.50 m (241 ft 2 in) overall
- Beam: 8.90 m (29 ft 2 in)
- Draft: 4.76 m (15 ft 7 in)
- Propulsion: 2 × Kampon Mk.23B Model 8 diesels; 1,850 bhp surfaced; 1,200 shp submerged; 2 shafts
- Speed: 13.0 knots (24.1 km/h) surfaced; 6.5 knots (12.0 km/h) submerged
- Range: 15,000 nmi (28,000 km) at 10 knots (19 km/h) surfaced; 120 nmi (220 km) at 3 knots (5.6 km/h) submerged
- Test depth: 75 m (246 ft)
- Capacity: I-361 to I-371 as built; 85 tons freight; I-372 as built; 90 tons gasoline; I-369 in July 1945; 100 tons gasoline
- Complement: 55
- Sensors & processing systems: 1 × Type 22 surface search radar; 1 × Type 13 early warning radar
- Armament: I-361 as built; 2 × 533 mm (21 in) torpedo tubes; 2 × Type 95 torpedoes; 1 × 14 cm/40 11th Year Type naval gun; 2 × Type 96 25mm AA guns; I-372 as built; 1 × 14 cm L/40 naval gun; 2 × Type 96 25mm AA guns; as Kaiten mother ship; 2 × 533 mm torpedo tubes; 2 × Type 95 torpedoes; 5 × Kaiten

General characteristics I-373 class (Modified Type-D submarine)
- Type: Transport submarine
- Displacement: 1,660 long tons (1,687 t) surfaced; 2,240 long tons (2,276 t) submerged
- Length: 74.00 m (242 ft 9 in) overall
- Beam: 8.90 m (29 ft 2 in)
- Draft: 5.05 m (16 ft 7 in)
- Propulsion: 2 × Kampon Mk.23B Model 8 diesels; 1,750 bhp surfaced; 1,200 shp submerged; 2 shafts
- Speed: 13.0 knots (24.1 km/h) surfaced; 6.5 knots (12.0 km/h) submerged
- Range: 5,000 nmi (9,300 km) at 13 knots (24 km/h) surfaced; 100 nmi (190 km) at 3 knots (5.6 km/h) submerged
- Test depth: 100 m (330 ft)
- Capacity: as built; 110 tons freight; I-373 in June 1945; 200 tons gasoline
- Complement: 55
- Armament: as built; 2 × 81 mm (3 in) Type 3 mortars; 7 × Type 96 25mm AA guns

The I-361 class submarine (伊三百六十一型潜水艦, I-san-byaku-roku-jū-ichi-gata Sensuikan), also called Type-D submarine (丁型/潜丁型潜水艦, Tei-gata/Sen-Tei-gata sensuikan) or Sen'yu/Sen'yu-Dai type submarine (潜輸型/潜輸大型潜水艦, Sen'yu-gata/Sen'yu-Ōgata sensuikan) was a type of the 1st class submarine in the Imperial Japanese Navy serving during the Second World War. The type name, was shortened to Yusō Sensuikan Ō-gata (輸送潜水艦大型, Transport Submarine-Large Type).

The I-373 class submarine (伊三百七十三型潜水艦, I-san-byaku-nana-jū-san-gata Sensuikan), also called Type-D Modified submarine (丁型改潜水艦, Tei-gata Kai sensuikan) was different from the I-361 class, however since the I-373 was a development form of the I-361 class, this article describes both of them.

== Construction ==
After the Battle of Midway the IJN immediately planned a transport submarine. The type was based on the U 155 Deutschland. Her duties were transportation of troops (110 men, 10 tons freight and two landing craft) in the areas where the enemy had air superiority. Later the demands for her were changed in sequence. The final demands were 65 tons in the hull and 25 tons on the upper deck (freight only). In the beginning the IJN did not intend to arm these boats with torpedoes. Later, after strong demands from the front commanders, it was decided to arm them with torpedoes for self-defense. The I-372 class was designed as a tanker submarine based on the I-361 class. They were not allowed to be loaded with torpedoes.

== Service ==
In 1944, the submarines were tasked with transport missions between from mainland Japan to remote islands. They had little success and suffered great losses. Of the 13 submarines, only four survived the war.

== Kaiten missions ==
In 1945, several submarines were converted to be Kaiten mother ships and assigned to the suicide attack operations for the Shinchō Tokubetsu Kōgekitai (神潮特別攻撃隊, Sinchō Special Attack Force). Their deck guns were removed and fittings for five Kaitens were installed on their decks.

- I-361
  - Assigned to the Todoroki group (轟隊) on 24 May 1945, no success.
- I-363
  - Assigned to the Todoroki group on 28 May 1945, sank (or damaged) one motor ship on 15 June 1945.
  - Assigned to the Tamon group (多聞隊) on 8 August 1945, no success.
- I-366
  - Assigned to the Tamon group on 1 August 1945, no success.
- I-367
  - Assigned to the Shinbu group (振武隊) on 5 May 1945, damaged USS Gilligan on 27 May 1945.
  - Assigned to the Tamon group on 19 July 1945, no success.
- I-368
  - Assigned to the Chihaya group (千早隊) on 20 February 1945, no success.
- I-370
  - Assigned to the Chihaya group on 20 February 1945, no success.
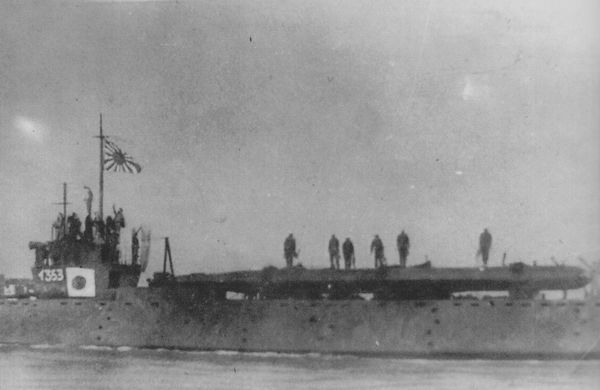
I-363 in May or August 1945

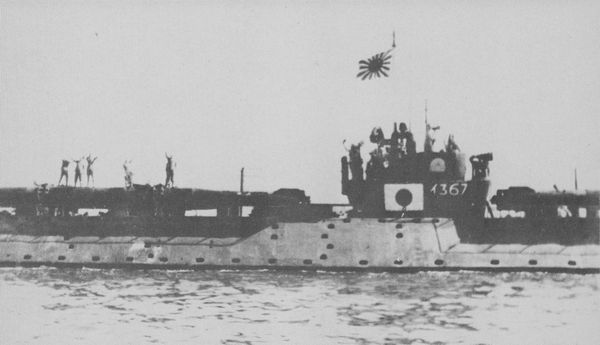
I-367 on 19 July 1945

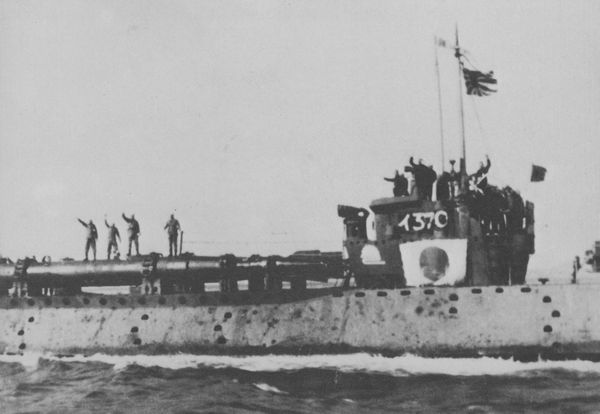
I-370 on 21 February 1945

== Class variants ==
The Type-D submarines were divided into four classes:

- Type-D/Sen'yu (丁型/潜輸（伊三百六十一型）, Tei-gata/Sen'yu, I-361-class)
- Type-D/Sen'yu Mod. (丁型/潜輸改（伊三百七十二型）, Tei-gata/Sen'yu-Kai, I-372-class)
- Type D Mod. (丁型改（伊三百七十三型）, Tei-gata Kai, I-373-class)
- Type D Mod.2/Type D 2 (S60 Type) (丁型改2/潜丁2型（第2968号艦型）, Tei-gata Kai-2/Sen-Tei-2-gata, 2968th vessel-class (Dai-2968-Gō kan-gata)). The 2968th vessel class boats were not built and remained only a design.

=== I-361 class ===
Boat #	Name	Builder	Laid down	Launched	Completed	Fate
5461	I-361	Kure Naval Arsenal	16 February 1943	30 October 1943	25 May 1944	Converted to a Kaiten mother ship on 7 February 1945. Sunk by aircraft from USS Anzio at east of Okinawa Island 22°22′N 134°09′E on 30 May 1945.
5462	I-362	Mitsubishi, Kōbe Shipyard	17 March 1943	29 November 1943	23 May 1944	Sunk by USS Fleming at Caroline Islands 12°08′N 130°28′E on 18 January 1945.
5463	I-363	Kure Naval Arsenal	1 May 1943	12 December 1943	8 July 1944	Converted to a Kaiten mother ship on 30 March 1945. Sunk by naval mine off Miyazaki on 29 October 1945. Salvaged and scrapped on 26 January 1966.
5464	I-364	Mitsubishi, Kōbe Shipyard	26 July 1943	15 February 1944	14 June 1944	Sunk by USS Sea Devil at Bōsō Peninsula 34°30′N 145°23′E on 15 September 1944.
5465	I-365	Yokosuka Naval Arsenal	15 May 1943	17 December 1943	1 August 1944	Sunk by USS Scabbardfish at Tōkyō Bay 34°44′N 141°01′E on 28 November 1944.
5466	I-366	Mitsubishi, Kōbe Shipyard	26 August 1943	29 March 1944	3 August 1944	Converted to a Kaiten mother ship on 3 March 1945. Decommissioned on 30 November 1945. Sunk as target off Gotō Islands on 1 April 1946.
5467	I-367	Mitsubishi, Kōbe Shipyard	22 October 1943	28 April 1944	15 August 1944	Converted to a Kaiten mother ship on 1 January 1945. Decommissioned on 30 November 1945. Sunk as target off Gotō Islands on 1 April 1946.
5468	I-368	Yokosuka Naval Arsenal	15 July 1943	29 January 1944	25 August 1944	Converted to a Kaiten mother ship in early 1945. Sunk by aircraft from USS Anzio at west of Iwo Jima 24°07′N 140°19′E on 27 February 1945.
5469	I-369	Yokosuka Naval Arsenal	1 September 1943	9 March 1944	9 October 1944	Converted to a tanker submarine in June 1945; decommissioned on 15 September 1945. Surrendered to United States at Yokosuka, later scrapped.
5470	I-370	Mitsubishi, Kōbe Shipyard	4 December 1943	26 May 1944	4 September 1944	Converted to a Kaiten mother ship in early 1945. Sunk by USS Finnegan at south of Iwo Jima 22°45′N 141°27′E on 26 February 1945.
5471	I-371	Mitsubishi, Kōbe Shipyard	22 March 1944	21 July 1944	2 October 1944	Sunk by USS Lagarto at Bungo Channel 32°40′N 132°33′E on 24 February 1945.

=== I-372 class ===
Project number S51B. She was going to become a lead ship of the Modified Type D submarines (I-373 class), at first. However, the IJN wanted a submarine as soon as possible. She was built as a tanker submarine according to revised I-361 drawings.

Boat #	Name	Builder	Laid down	Launched	Completed	Fate
2961	I-372	Yokosuka Naval Arsenal	10 February 1944	22 June 1944	8 November 1944	Sunk by USN carrier aircraft from Task Force 38 at Yokosuka on 18 July 1945. I-372 was raised, towed to deep water, and scuttled in August 1946.

=== I-373 class ===
Project number S51C. Improved model of the I-361 class. Furthermore, the IJN was planned reinforced model of the I-373 class, also. However all of them were cancelled.

Boat #	Name	Builder	Laid down	Launched	Completed	Fate
2962	I-373	Yokosuka Naval Arsenal	15 August 1944	30 November 1944	14 April 1945	Converted to a tanker submarine in June 1945; sunk by USS Spikefish at East China Sea 29°02′N 123°53′E on 13 August 1945.
2963	I-374	Yokosuka Naval Arsenal	24 October 1944			Construction stopped on 17 April 1945 (40% complete), later scrapped.
2964	I-375					Cancelled on 17 April 1945.
2965 - 2967						Cancelled on 17 April 1945.

== Bibliography ==
- Bagnasco, Erminio (1977). Submarines of World War Two. Annapolis, Maryland: Naval Institute Press. ISBN 0-87021-962-6.
- Carpenter, Dorr B. & Polmar, Norman (1986). Submarines of the Imperial Japanese Navy 1904–1945. London: Conway Maritime Press. ISBN 0-85177-396-6.
- Chesneau, Roger, ed. (1980). Conway's All the World's Fighting Ships 1922–1946. Greenwich, UK: Conway Maritime Press. ISBN 0-85177-146-7.
- "Rekishi Gunzō"., History of Pacific War Vol.17 I-Gō Submarines, Gakken (Japan), January 1998, ISBN 4-05-601767-0
- "Rekishi Gunzō"., History of Pacific War Vol.36 Kairyū and Kaiten, Gakken (Japan), May 2002, ISBN 4-05-602693-9
- "Rekishi Gunzō"., History of Pacific War Vol.62 Ships of The Imperial Japanese Forces, Gakken (Japan), January 2008, ISBN 4-05-605008-2
- "Rekishi Gunzō"., History of Pacific War Vol.63 Documents of IJN submarines and USN submarines, Gakken (Japan), January 2008, ISBN 978-4-05-605004-2
- The Maru Special, Japanese Naval Vessels No.43 Japanese Submarines III, Ushio Shobō (Japan), September 1980, Book code 68343–43
- Senshi Sōsho Vol.88, Naval armaments and war preparation (2), "And after the outbreak of war", Asagumo Simbun (Japan), October 1975

== See also ==
- Type 4 Ka-Tsu
- Ha-101-class submarine
