= USS Scabbardfish =

Submarine of the United States

Coordinates: 33°20′N 142°01′E

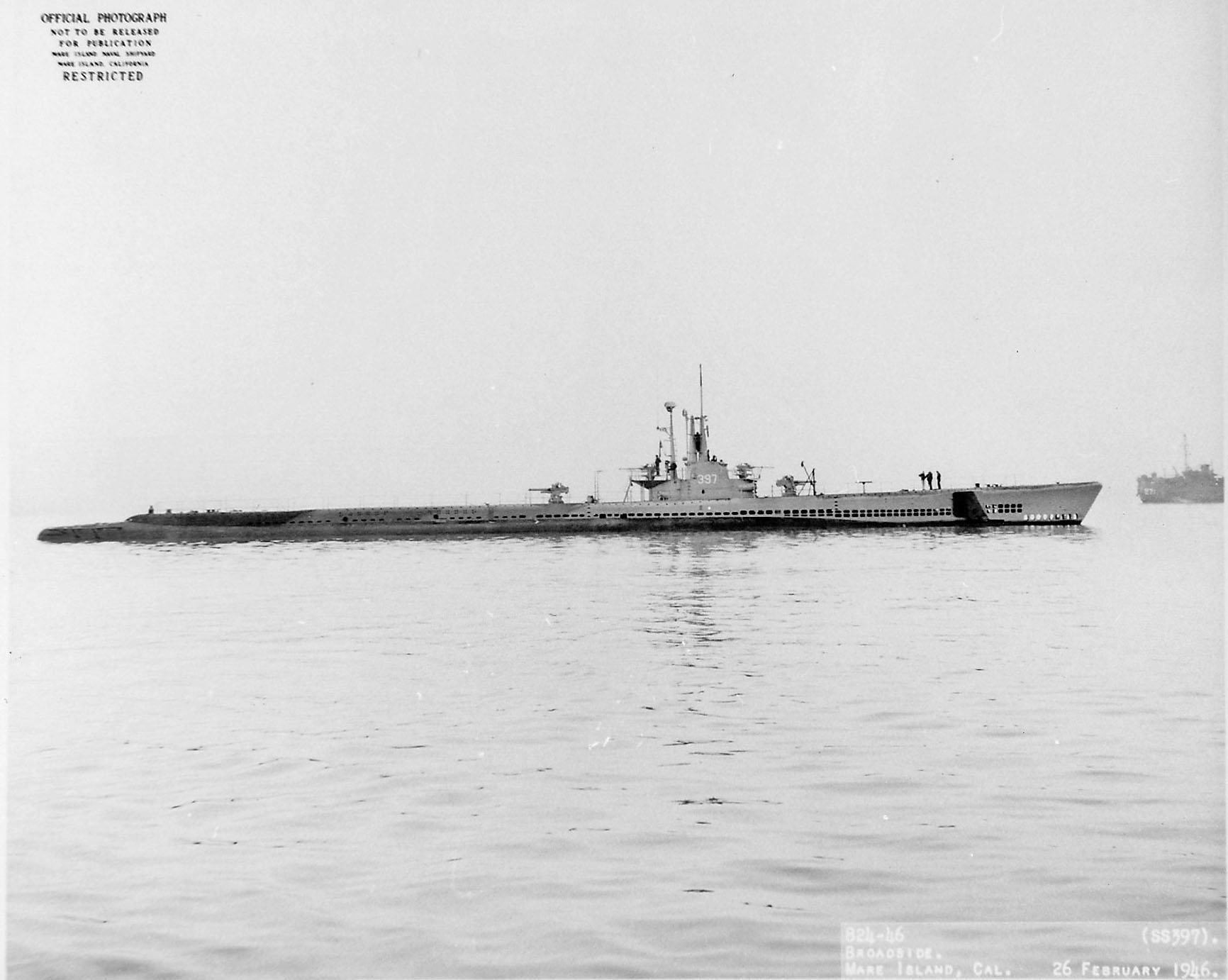

History

United States
- Name: USS Scabbardfish
- Namesake: Scabbarddfish
- Builder: Portsmouth Naval Shipyard, Kittery, Maine
- Laid down: 27 September 1943
- Launched: 27 January 1944
- Sponsored by: Ensign Nancy J. Schetky, USNR
- Commissioned: 29 April 1944
- Decommissioned: 26 February 1965
- Identification: SS-397
- Nickname(s): "Scabby"
- Fate: Transferred to Greece 26 February 1965; Stricken 31 January 1976; Sold to Greece 31 January 1976 or April 1976

Greece
- Name: Triaina
- Acquired: 26 February 1965
- Decommissioned: 12 January 1979
- Stricken: 1980
- Identification: S86
- Status: Extant 1982

General characteristics
- Class & type: Balao-class diesel-electric submarine
- Displacement: 1,526 tons (1,550 t) surfaced; 2,391 tons (2,429 t) submerged
- Length: 311 ft 6 in (94.95 m)
- Beam: 27 ft 3 in (8.31 m)
- Draft: 16 ft 10 in (5.13 m) maximum
- Propulsion: 4 × Fairbanks-Morse Model 38D8-⅛ 10-cylinder opposed piston diesel engines driving electrical generators; 2 × 126-cell Sargo batteries; 4 × high-speed Elliott electric motors with reduction gears; two propellers; 5,400 shp (4.0 MW) surfaced; 2,740 shp (2.0 MW) submerged
- Speed: 20.25 kn (37.50 km/h; 23.30 mph) surfaced; 8.75 kn (16.21 km/h; 10.07 mph) submerged
- Range: 11,000 nmi (20,000 km; 13,000 mi) surfaced at 10 kn (19 km/h; 12 mph) (19 km/h)
- Endurance: 48 hours at 2 kn (3.7 km/h; 2.3 mph) submerged; 75 days on patrol
- Test depth: 400 ft (120 m)
- Complement: 10 officers, 70–71 enlisted
- Armament: 10 × 21-inch (533 mm) torpedo tubes; 6 forward, 4 aft; 24 torpedoes; 1 × 5-inch (127 mm) / 25 caliber deck gun; Bofors 40 mm and Oerlikon 20 mm cannon

USS Scabbardfish (SS-397), a Balao-class submarine, was the only ship of the United States Navy to be named after the scabbarddfish, a long, compressed, silver-colored fish found on European coasts and around New Zealand. In 1965 she was transferred to the Hellenic Navy and renamed Triaina.

== Construction and commissioning ==
Scabbardfish′s keel was laid down on 27 September 1943 by the Portsmouth Navy Yard in Kittery, Maine. She was launched on 27 January 1944, sponsored by Ensign Nancy J. Schetky, USNR, and commissioned on 29 April 1944.

== Service history ==
=== U.S. Navy ===
==== World War II ====
After completing initial training at Portsmouth, New Hampshire, and torpedo trials at Newport, Rhode Island, Scabbardfish reported to the Commander, Submarine Force Atlantic at New London, Connecticut, for advanced training and final outfitting. Upon completion thereof, she proceeded to Key West, Florida, for anti-submarine warfare duties which began on 21 June 1944. On 1 July 1944, she departed for Panama. Four days later, she transited the Panama Canal en route to the United States West Coast and Pearl Harbor, Hawaii.

Scabbardfish, as a unit of Submarine Force, Pacific Fleet, arrived at Pearl Harbor on 24 July 1944. After completing voyage repairs and final training, she departed for Midway Atoll in the Northwestern Hawaiian Islands on 17 August 1944.

===== First war patrol =====
After refueling at Midway, Scabbardfish departed on her first war patrol, assigned a patrol area in the vicinity of the Ryukyu Islands. On 31 August 1944, she sighted her first enemy ships, a Japanese inter-island steamer with two escorts. Scabbardfish fired two spreads of three torpedoes, but all missed. After suffering a light depth charge attack, she surfaced and continued west.

On 19 September 1944, west of Okinawa, she damaged the 5,500-ton submarine tender Jingei with two torpedo hits. She also fired a spread of torpedoes "down the throat" of an approaching Chidori-class escort, but missed. As a consequence, she underwent a depth charge attack for three hours but suffered no damage. The remainder of her patrol proved fruitless, and she returned to Midway Atoll on 12 October 1944 for refitting.

===== Second and third war patrols =====
On 26 October 1944, Scabbardfish departed Midway Atoll for Saipan in the Mariana Islands for further orders. She departed Saipan on 12 November 1944 to patrol in the seas southeast of Honshū, Japan. She arrived in her patrol area on 16 November 1944 and sank a 2,100-gross register ton inter-island steamer that day. On 22 November 1944, she sank the 875-gross register ton merchant ship Kisaragi Maru, damaged a 4,000-gross register ton cargo ship, and sank the 407=gross register ton Japanese stores ship Hokkai Maru. On 29 November 1944, she sank the Japanese Type D submarine I-365, picking up one lone survivor named Sasaki.

Scabbardfish completed her patrol at Guam on 20 December 1944. She remained there until 16 January 1945 and then proceeded to Saipan. Upon arrival there, she underwent intensive training in wolfpack tactics. Her third war patrol began on 23 January 1945, when she began patrolling the sea lanes between the Philippine Islands and Ryukyu Islands. In late February 1945, she engaged 12 luggers and a trawler with her deck gun but was forced to submerge by a Japanese plane. She was bombed but suffered no damage. She returned to Saipan on 6 March 1945 and was ordered to return to Pearl Harbor for refitting.

===== Fourth war patrol =====
Scabbardfish returned to Guam in late April and underwent voyage repairs by the submarine tender USS Holland (AS-3). On 29 April 1945, she departed for a patrol area in the East China Sea. A change of orders assigned her to lifeguard duty, and, on 4 May 1945, she rescued five crewmen from a ditched United States Army Air Forces B-29 Superfortress. She transferred them to the submarine USS Picuda (SS-382) on 6 May 1945, then moved to the Yellow Sea area. On 17 May 1945, she fired a spread of torpedoes at a small Japanese cargo ship accompanied by two escorts. This proved to be a hunter-killer group, and when the torpedoes missed, they subjected Scabbardfish to a grueling four-hour depth charge attack. Scabbardfish sustained no serious damage and returned to Guam on 11 June 1945 to be refitted by the submarine tender USS Apollo (AS-25).

===== Fifth war patrol =====
Scabbardfish began her fifth and last war patrol of World War II on 1 July 1945 with another assignment to the lifeguard duty. Between 25 July and 10 August 1945 she rescued seven pilots. She returned to Saipan on 15 August 1945, the day hostilities with Japan ended.

==== Post-World War II ====
===== 1945–1948 =====
Scabbardfish subsequently departed Saipan to proceed to Pearl Harbor. She got underway from Pearl Harbor on 6 September 1945 in company with the submarines USS Redfish (SS-395), USS Sea Dog (SS-401), and USS Sea Fox (SS-402) under orders which sent her to Eniwetok Atoll in the Marshall Islands for antisubmarine training duties. After parting company with the other three submarines on 13 September 1945, she proceeded alone to Eniwetok, which she reached on 15 September 1945 and where she relieved the submarine USS Thresher (SS-200) in training antisubmarine warfare forces. She remained at Eniwetok for a month, moved to Guam for a month and, on 14 November 1945, stood out of Apra Harbor, Guam, en route to San Francisco, California, via Midway Atoll. On 29 November 1945, she arrived at Mare Island Navy Yard in Vallejo, California, for her first overhaul, which was completed in mid-March 1946.

Scabbardfish operated along the U.S. West Coast until 17 March 1947, when she entered the San Francisco Naval Shipyard for her second major overhaul. She departed directly from drydock on 8 August 1947 bound for San Diego, California. One month later, she called at Pearl Harbor for a few days and then continued west on a simulated war patrol. After visiting the Palau Islands, Hong Kong, Shanghai, Tsingtao, and Okinawa, she returned to San Diego on 11 December 1947.

On 3 January 1948, Scabbardfish got underway for Mare Island Navy Yard and on 5 January 1948 reported to the Pacific Reserve Fleet for inactivation. In February 1948 she was berthed at Mare Island, and on 12 May 1948 she was decommissioned and placed in reserve.

===== Korean War =====
The Korean War broke out in June 1950, and on 31 January 1951 Scabbardfish was recommissioned, at a time when submarines increasingly were taking part in special operations, including amphibious raids and other clandestine missions. Based at Pearl Harbor, she conducted one Korean War deployment, from 31 July to 2 December 1952, during which she participated in reconnaissance missions and conducted two war patrols. In December 1952, when weather conditions required suspension of the Hokkaido-area patrols she took part in north of Japan, she was reassigned to special patrol duty off the coast of China. She received the Korean Service Medal for her operations during the Korean War.

===== 1953–1964 =====
The Korean War ended in July 1953, and Scabbardfish was decommissioned at Mare Island on 27 November 1953. She remained there until 24 October 1964, when she was again placed in commission, preparatory to transferring her to the government of Greece.

==== Honors and awards ====
Scabbardfish received five battle stars for World War II service.

- Korean Service Medal

=== Royal Hellenic Navy ===
Scabbardfish was officially transferred on loan to Greece on 26 February 1965 and commissioned in the Royal Hellenic Navy as Triaina (S-86). She was stricken from the American Naval Vessel Register on 31 January 1976, and Greece purchased her outright in April 1976. She was decommissioned on 12 January 1979 and stricken from the Greek Navy in 1980, but remained in use as a pier-side trainer as late as 1982.
