= Japanese submarine I-364 =

Imperial Japanese Navy submarine

History

Japan
- Name: Submarine No. 5464
- Builder: Mitsubishi, Kobe, Japan
- Laid down: 26 July 1943
- Renamed: I-364 on 20 October 1943
- Launched: 15 February 1944
- Completed: 14 June 1944
- Commissioned: 14 June 1944
- Fate: Sunk, 16 September 1944
- Stricken: 10 December 1944

General characteristics
- Class & type: Type D1 submarine
- Displacement: 1,440 long tons (1,463 t) surfaced; 2,215 long tons (2,251 t) submerged
- Length: 73.50 m (241 ft 2 in) overall
- Beam: 8.90 m (29 ft 2 in)
- Draft: 4.76 m (15 ft 7 in)
- Propulsion: 2 × Kampon Mk.23B Model 8 diesels; 1,850 bhp surfaced; 1,200 shp submerged; 2 shafts
- Speed: 13.0 knots (24.1 km/h) surfaced; 6.5 knots (12.0 km/h) submerged
- Range: 15,000 nmi (28,000 km) at 10 knots (19 km/h) surfaced; 120 nmi (220 km) at 3 knots (5.6 km/h) submerged
- Test depth: 75 m (246 ft)
- Boats & landing craft carried: 2 x Daihatsu-class landing craft
- Capacity: 85 tons freight
- Complement: 55
- Sensors & processing systems: 1 × Type 22 surface search radar; 1 × Type 13 early warning radar
- Armament: 1 × 14 cm/40 11th Year Type naval gun; 2 × Type 96 25mm AA guns

I-364 was an Imperial Japanese Navy Type D1 transport submarine. Completed and commissioned in July 1944, she served in World War II and was sunk during her first transport mission in September 1944.

== Construction and commissioning ==
I-364 was laid down on 26 July 1943 by Mitsubishi at Kobe, Japan, with the name Submarine No. 5464. She was renamed I-364 on 20 October 1943 and provisionally attached to the Yokosuka Naval District that day. She was launched on 15 February 1944 and was completed and commissioned on 14 June 1944.

== Service history ==
Upon commissioning, I-364 was attached formally to the Yokosuka Naval District and was assigned to Submarine Squadron 11 for workups. With her workups complete, she was reassigned to Submarine Squadron 7 on 6 September 1944. On 14 September 1944, she departed Yokosuka bound for Wake Island on her first transport mission, expecting to reach Wake in late September.

I-364 was on the surface in the Pacific Ocean 250 nautical miles (460 km; 290 mi) east of Honshu′s Boso Peninsula on a base course of 90 degrees (i.e., due east) and making 9.5 knots (17.6 km/h; 10.9 mph) when the United States Navy submarine USS Sea Devil detected her on radar at 04:32 on 16 September 1944. Sea Devil began to track I-364, and Sea Devil's commanding officer observed a large Rising Sun insignia painted on I-364's conning tower and misidentified her as an "I-58-class" submarine. At dawn, I-364 began to zigzag and Sea Devil began an approach for an attack position. As I-364 passed in front of Sea Devil at a range of 1,800 yards (1,600 m), Sea Devil fired four Mark 18 Mod 2 electric torpedoes. Two of them hit, and I-364 sank with the loss of her entire crew of 77 at 34°30′N 145°23′E, leaving behind a large pall of brown smoke.

On 31 October 1944, the Imperial Japanese Navy declared I-364 to be presumed lost with all hands. She was stricken from the Navy list on 10 December 1944.

== Sources ==
- Hackett, Bob & Kingsepp, Sander. IJN Submarine I-364: Tabular Record of Movement. Retrieved on September 17, 2020.
