= Japanese submarine I-365 =

1st class submarine of the Imperial Japanese Navy

History

Japan
- Name: Submarine No. 5465
- Builder: Yokosuka Navy Yard, Yokosuka, Japan
- Laid down: 15 May 1943
- Renamed: I-365 on 20 October 1943
- Launched: 17 December 1943
- Completed: 1 August 1944
- Commissioned: 1 August 1944
- Fate: Sunk, 29 November 1944
- Stricken: 10 March 1945

General characteristics
- Class & type: Type D1 submarine
- Displacement: 1,440 long tons (1,463 t) surfaced; 2,215 long tons (2,251 t) submerged
- Length: 73.50 m (241 ft 2 in) overall
- Beam: 8.90 m (29 ft 2 in)
- Draft: 4.76 m (15 ft 7 in)
- Propulsion: 2 × Kampon Mk.23B Model 8 diesels; 1,850 bhp surfaced; 1,200 shp submerged; 2 shafts
- Speed: 13.0 knots (24.1 km/h) surfaced; 6.5 knots (12.0 km/h) submerged
- Range: 15,000 nmi (28,000 km) at 10 knots (19 km/h) surfaced; 120 nmi (220 km) at 3 knots (5.6 km/h) submerged
- Test depth: 75 m (246 ft)
- Boats & landing craft carried: 2 x Daihatsu-class landing craft
- Capacity: 85 tons freight
- Complement: 55
- Sensors & processing systems: 1 × Type 22 surface search radar; 1 × Type 13 early warning radar
- Armament: 1 × 14 cm/40 11th Year Type naval gun; 2 × Type 96 25 mm AA guns

I-365 was an Imperial Japanese Navy Type D1 transport submarine. Completed and commissioned in August 1944, she served in World War II and was sunk while returning from her first transport mission in November 1944.

== Construction and commissioning ==
I-365 was laid down on 15 May 1943 by the Yokosuka Navy Yard at Yokosuka, Japan, with the name Submarine No. 5465. She was renamed I-365 on 20 October 1943 and provisionally attached to the Yokosuka Naval District that day. She was launched on 17 December 1943 and was completed and commissioned on 1 August 1944.

== Service history ==
Upon commissioning, I-365 was attached formally to the Yokosuka Naval District and was assigned to Submarine Squadron 11 for workups. With her workups complete, she was reassigned to Submarine Squadron 7 on 30 September 1944.

On 1 November 1944, I-365 departed Yokosuka bound for Truk on her first transport mission, carrying a cargo of mail and medicine. She reached Truk on 15 November 1944, unloaded her cargo, and embarked 31 passengers. She got back underway on 16 November 1944 with total of 96 passengers and crew aboard bound for the Bonin Islands, intending to proceed to Yokosuka after her stop in the Bonins. She sent a routine signal on 25 November 1944 while east of the Bonins. The Japanese never heard from her again.

On 29 November 1944, the United States Navy submarine USS Scabbardfish sighted I-365 with her high periscope while I-365 was on the surface in the Pacific Ocean 75 nautical miles (139 km; 86 mi) southeast of Yokosuka. Scabbardfish tracked I-365 for three hours before a Japanese aircraft forced her to submerge, but she surfaced and completed an "end-around" maneuver in which she outran I-365 and submerged in a favorable firing position in front of I-365. Scabbardfish launched two torpedoes from her stern torpedo tubes at a range of 1,625 yards (1,486 m). At 09:40, one of them hit I-365, exploding on her starboard side in her forward battery compartment. I-365 sank in 30 seconds at 34°44′N 141°01′E. Scabbardfish surfaced and found the sea surface covered with oil and debris and five survivors in the water. Four refused rescue and eventually died in the water, but Scabbardfish brought the fifth man aboard. The sole survivor of I-365, he identified his submarine as I-365 to Scabbardfish's crew.

On 10 December 1944, the Imperial Japanese Navy declared I-365 to be presumed lost off the Bonin Islands. She was stricken from the Navy list on 10 March 1945.

== Sources ==
- Hackett, Bob & Kingsepp, Sander. IJN Submarine I-365: Tabular Record of Movement. Retrieved on September 17, 2020.
