= Japanese submarine I-373 =

History

Japan
- Name: Submarine No. 2962
- Builder: Yokosuka Navy Yard, Yokosuka, Japan
- Laid down: 15 August 1944
- Renamed: I-373 on 5 October 1944
- Launched: 30 November 1944
- Completed: 14 April 1945
- Commissioned: 14 April 1945
- Fate: Sunk 14 August 1945
- Stricken: 15 September 1945

General characteristics
- Class & type: Type D2 submarine
- Displacement: 1,660 long tons (1,687 t) surfaced; 2,240 long tons (2,276 t) submerged
- Length: 74.00 m (242 ft 9 in) overall
- Beam: 8.90 m (29 ft 2 in)
- Draft: 5.05 m (16 ft 7 in)
- Propulsion: 2 × Kampon Mk.23B Model 8 diesels; 1,750 bhp surfaced; 1,200 shp submerged; 2 shafts
- Speed: 13.0 knots (24.1 km/h) surfaced; 6.5 knots (12.0 km/h) submerged
- Range: 5,000 nmi (9,300 km) at 13 knots (24 km/h) surfaced; 100 nmi (190 km) at 3 knots (5.6 km/h) submerged
- Test depth: 100 m (330 ft)
- Capacity: 110 tons freight (as built); 200 tons gasoline June 1945
- Complement: 55
- Armament: 2 × 81 mm (3 in) Type 3 mortars; 7 × Type 96 25mm AA guns

I-373 was an Imperial Japanese Navy Type D2 transport submarine. The only Type D2 submarine to be completed, she was commissioned in April 1945, and converted into a tanker submarine. In August 1945 she became the last Japanese submarine sunk during World War II.

== Construction and commissioning ==
I-373 was laid down on 13 August 1944 by Yokosuka Navy Yard at Yokosuka, Japan, with the name Submarine No. 2962. On 5 October 1944, she was renamed I-373 and was provisionally attached to the Yokosuka Naval District. She was launched on 30 November 1944 and was completed and commissioned on 14 April 1945.

== Service history ==
Upon commissioning, I-373 was attached formally to the Yokosuka Naval District and was assigned to Submarine Squadron 11 for workups. On 16 June 1945, she departed Yokosuka bound for Sasebo. Arriving at Sasebo on 17 June 1945, she began conversion into a tanker submarine capable of carrying 150 metric tons of aviation gasoline in addition to other cargo. On 20 June 1945, she was reassigned to Submarine Division 15 in the 6th Fleet.

=== Transport operations ===
Fleet Radio Unit, Melbourne (FRUMEL), an Allied signals intelligence unit headquartered at Melbourne, Australia, reported that it had intercepted and decrypted signals that indicated that I-373 departed Sasebo on a supply run to Takao on Formosa on 3 July 1945 and returned to Sasebo on 26 July 1945, but post-World War II examination of Japanese records has not corroborated FRUMEL's reporting.

On 5 August 1945, FRUMEL reported that it had intercepted and decrypted a Japanese signal indicating that I-373 would depart Sasebo that day bound for Takao and would return with a cargo of aviation gasoline, rice, and sugar. In fact, I-373 got underway from Sasebo on 9 August 1945 headed for Takao.

=== Loss ===
At 20:10 on 13 August 1945, I-373 was on the surface in the East China Sea 200 nautical miles (370 km; 230 mi) southeast of Shanghai, China, making 10 knots (19 km/h; 12 mph) and zigzagging around a base course of 230 degrees true when the United States Navy submarine USS Spikefish (SS-404) detected her on radar. Spikefish′s radar detector also detected the pulse of I-373′s Type 13 air-search radar. Spikefish closed the range, sighted I-373 at a range of 3,500 yards (3,200 m) at 20:18, and tracked her for an hour, but lost visual contact at 21:18 when I-373 feinted to the southeast and then submerged.

At 00:07 on 14 August 1945, Spikefish regained radar contact on I-373 at a range of 8,600 yards (7,900 m) and began tracking her again, finally confirming that I-373 was a Japanese submarine at 04:19. At 04:24, Spikefish fired a spread of six Mark 14 Mod 3A torpedoes at a range of 1,300 yards (1,200 m). Two hit I-373, which sank by the stern at 29°02′N 123°53′E. Spikefish′s sound operator reported hearing loud sounds of air escaping from the sinking I-373.

Spikefish surfaced, and at 05:40 she passed through a thick slick of diesel fuel and a large amount of floating debris. She found five survivors in the water, all of whom refused rescue. She left four of them to perish in the water but forcibly brought one of them aboard. The sole survivor of I-373, he misidentified her to Spikefish′s crew as the nonexistent submarine "I-382."

Eighty-four men died in the sinking of I-373, the last Japanese submarine lost in World War II, which ended the next day. The Japanese removed her from the Navy list on 15 September 1945.

== Sources ==
- Hackett, Bob & Kingsepp, Sander. IJN Submarine I-373: Tabular Record of Movement. Retrieved on September 19, 2020.
