= USS Lagarto =

Submarine of the United States

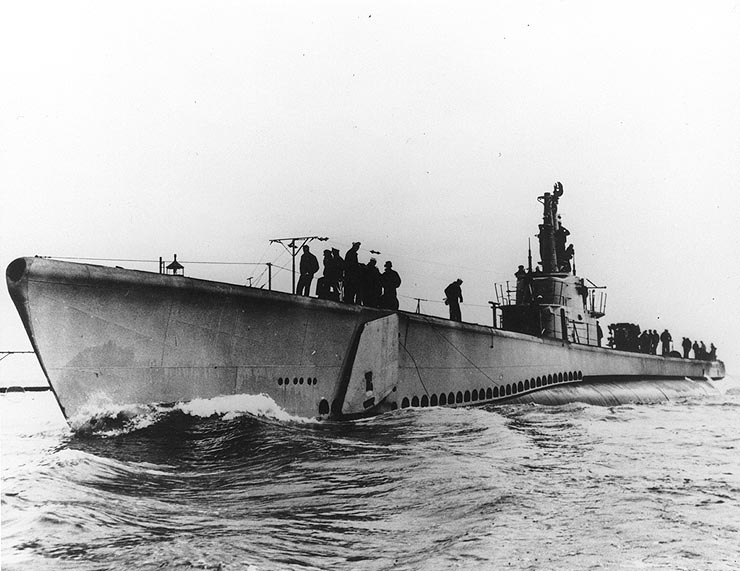
- USS Lagarto (SS-371) under way, probably in Lake Michigan during trials, c. late 1944.

History

United States
- Name: Lagarto
- Builder: Manitowoc Shipbuilding Company, Manitowoc, Wisconsin
- Laid down: 12 January 1944
- Launched: 28 May 1944
- Commissioned: 14 October 1944
- Fate: Sunk by Japanese minelayer Hatsutaka in the Gulf of Siam, 4 May 1945. All 88 hands lost - no survivors

General characteristics
- Class & type: Balao-class diesel-electric submarine
- Displacement: 1,526 long tons (1,550 t) surfaced; 2,424 long tons (2,463 t) submerged
- Length: 311 ft 9 in (95.02 m)
- Beam: 27 ft 3 in (8.31 m)
- Draft: 16 ft 10 in (5.13 m) maximum
- Propulsion: 4 × General Motors Model 16-278A V16 diesel engines driving electrical generators; 2 × 126-cell Sargo batteries; 4 × high-speed General Electric electric motors with reduction gears; 2 × propellers; 5,400 shp (4.0 MW) surfaced; 2,740 shp (2.0 MW) submerged
- Speed: 20.25 knots (38 km/h) surfaced; 8.75 knots (16 km/h) submerged
- Range: 11,000 nautical miles (20,000 km) surfaced at 10 knots (19 km/h)
- Endurance: 48 hours at 2 knots (3.7 km/h) submerged; 75 days on patrol
- Test depth: 400 ft (120 m)
- Complement: 10 officers, 70–71 enlisted
- Armament: 10 × 21-inch (533 mm) torpedo tubes; 6 forward, 4 aft; 24 torpedoes; 1 × 5-inch (127 mm) / 25 caliber deck gun; Bofors 40 mm and Oerlikon 20 mm cannon

USS Lagarto (SS-371), a Balao-class submarine, was the only ship of the United States Navy to be named for the lagarto, a lizard fish.

== Construction and commissioning ==
Lagarto′s keel was laid down on 12 January 1944 by the Manitowoc Shipbuilding Company of Manitowoc, Wisconsin. She was launched on 28 May 1944, sponsored by Emily Taft Douglas, Congresswoman from Illinois, and later United States Senator from Illinois, and commissioned on 14 October 1944 with Commander Frank D. Latta in command. Latta was a veteran of nine war patrols and holder of the Navy Cross, earned while commanding officer of the submarine USS Narwhal (SS-167).

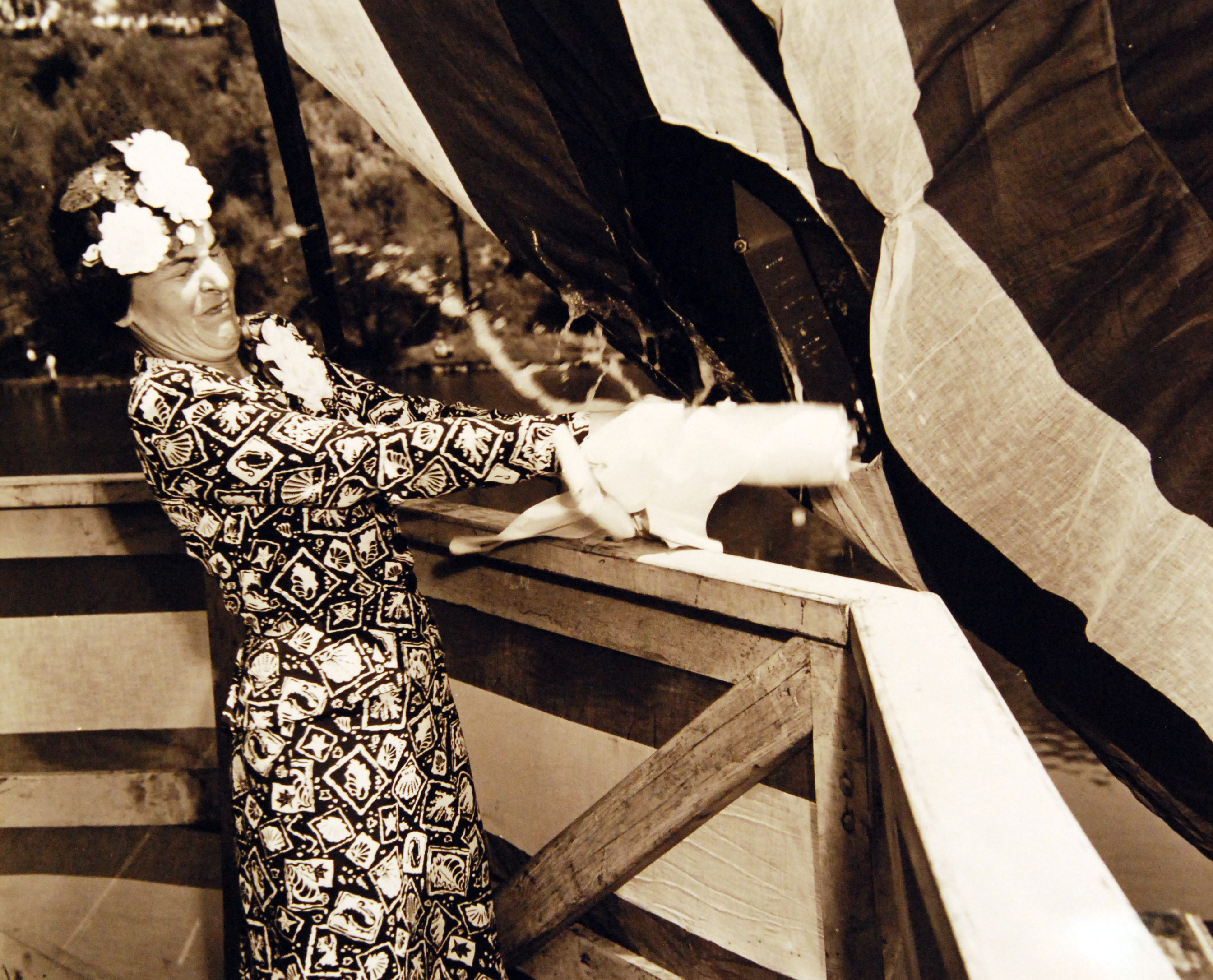
USS Lagarto (SS-371) being christened by Emily Taft Douglas at the Manitowoc Shipbuilding Company, Manitowoc, Wisconsin, May 28, 1944.

== Operational history ==
=== November–December 1944 ===
Floated high and dry in a floating drydock down the Mississippi River, among the islands and channels of which her captain had first "felt the call of the sea" as "a mere youth", Lagarto departed New Orleans, Louisiana, on 12 November 1944, for Panama, escorted by the submarine chaser SC-512. Releasing her escort on 15 November, Lagarto reported to Commander, Panama Sea Frontier, to begin her shakedown two days later. Captain John G. Johns supervised the boat's training during the period between 20 November and 5 December 1944. Sadly, during that period, on 3 December, Chief Machinist's Mate Pat Cole died of coronary thrombosis while Lagarto lay at Saboya Anchorage, off Perlas Island, Panama.

Clearing Balboa, Canal Zone, on 9 December 1944, Lagarto reached Pearl Harbor on Christmas Day 1944. The following day, she commenced a period of training (supervised by Captain Jesse L. Hull for its duration) and a special availability. The latter saw the installation of a second 5 in (130 mm) gun and replacement of the 20 mm with two 40 mm mounts, installation of additional topside ready-use lockers, eight topside mounts for .50 cal (12.7 mm) machine guns, in addition to other internal work, including the alteration of the small arms magazine to accommodate additional 5-inch (130 mm) ammunition stowage, bringing the boat's total capacity to 220 rounds. Additionally, a Panama Bay sound test having revealed a "singing" port propeller, that was replaced. The special training and availability period concluded on 23 January 1945.

=== January – March 1945 ===
Lagarto, accompanied by Haddock, departed Pearl Harbor on 24 January 1945, escorted initially by PC-486. Releasing their escort four and a half hours out, the two boats proceeded in company, conducting dives and drills daily and acting as targets for each other on alternate days. Ultimately, the pair reached the Marianas on 4 February, exchanging recognition signals with friendly planes as they neared Saipan. Escorted in by the infantry landing craft LCI-677 on 5 February, Lagarto moored in a nest alongside Angler as she lay alongside Fulton in Tanapag Harbor. Haddock moored outboard.

Tragedy struck the next day, however, when an automobile accident on Saipan resulted in serious injuries to two of Lagarto's more experienced officers: Lieutenant Walter R. Shaw, a "mustang" (commissioned from the enlisted ranks) veteran of three war patrols, and Ensign Allen G. Brewington, who, like Shaw, was a mustang but a veteran of nine patrols, including one in Haddock for which he had earned the Silver Star. In addition, the mishap incapacitated three of Haddock's officers, including Commander John P. "Beetle" Roach, her skipper and a Naval Academy classmate of Lagarto's commanding officer. Consequently, Lieutenant Robert J. Williams (five war patrols) and Lieutenant, junior grade Walter B. Phelps (four war patrols) arrived by air from Guam, reporting on board Lagarto late in the forenoon watch on 7 February to replace Shaw and Brewington.

Under way during the first dog watch on 7 February 1945, escorted by the motor minesweeper YMS-426, "Latta's Lancers" (Task Group 17.13) formed column—Lagarto, Haddock, and Sennet—and headed for the Bonin Islands to destroy "picket boats" in advance of the carrier strikes planned to be launched by Task Force 38 in mid-month. Releasing YMS-426 at midnight, Lagarto decoded a dispatch a little over two hours into the mid watch on 8 February, however, communicating the sad tidings that Lieutenant Shaw had died ("His loss was a serious blow to the Lagarto," wrote Captain Willard J. Suits, Commander, Submarine Squadron 22, "and the submarine service.") of the injuries suffered in the automobile accident on the 6th. At noon the same day (8 February), while Lagarto mourned her loss, Commander Latta informed the "wolfpack" that its being behind schedule would not permit coordinated practice firing.

==== 12 – 13 February ====
Entering the assigned patrol area on 11 February 1945, "Latta's Lancers" commenced searching for their quarry. A quarter of an hour into the first dog watch on 12 February, Lagarto sighted four B-29s; contacting two over her VHF (very high frequency) radio equipment, she "received [the] dope on [the] picket vessels" they sought. Haddock likewise obtained contact data from the Superfortresses. Thus forewarned, Haddock obtained the first radar contact an hour before the end of the first watch on 12 February; opening the range, she commenced tracking what proved to be the "guard boats" (converted trawlers) No.8 Kotoshiro Maru (109 tons) and No.3 Showa Maru (76 tons), neither vessel under way.

"With excellent SCR (Set, Complete, Radio) communication," Commander Latta "outlined [the] plan to [the] other skippers as easily as if we were in the same wardroom". He ordered Sennet to westward, maintaining contact with her SJ radar, while Lagarto kept in touch with Haddock in like fashion. With the coming of the mid watch on 13 February 1945, the Japanese craft still lay-to, "apparently not alerted." Consequently, Latta ordered Haddock to break contact and his boat formed a line of bearing on Sennet. Lagarto began opening to westward at 04:15, and at 05:40 began heading in on the surface toward the last known position of No.8 Kotoshiro Maru and No.3 Showa Maru. With Sennet on the left flank and Haddock on the right, and Lagarto as guide in the center, the boats some 3,000 yards (2,700 m) apart, Latta planned to close to 7,000 yards (6,400 m), then turn right about 50 degrees, to put the seas and wind in a most favorable position and still close the range, allocating Sennet the picket to the north, Haddock the one to the south; Lagarto, meanwhile, would direct the fire to whichever vessel "appeared to be offering the most opposition."

At 06:20 on 13 February 1945, Lagarto manned her battle surface stations, and opened fire with her number one 5-inch (13 cm) gun 12 minutes later on the clearly unsuspecting enemy that lay "nicely outlined against [the] red eastern sky" 7,200 yards (6,600 m) distant. "Japs began jabbering in high gear at 4,475 KCS!" Latta reported subsequently, as one of the guard boats managed to transmit a dispatch as chaos descended suddenly upon her: "Gun attack by submarines in position 30-00N, 136-30E...” Lagarto's photographer seemed elated (in a "happy daze," the commanding officer reported) at the apparently photogenic aspect of the action he was recording, repeating "Oh boy, Oh boy!"

No such elation seized the enemy, however, who determinedly fought back against his heavier adversaries, as the action progressed, with whatever caliber weapon lay at hand. No.8 Kotoshiro Maru and No.3 Showa Maru began turning to the northward, returning fire with what appeared to be approximately "40-millimeter size" weapons. Lagarto recorded "numerous splashes within twenty yards (18 m) of ship..." Lagarto, followed by Sennet and Haddock, concentrated her fire upon No.8 Kotoshiro Maru, the leading and northerly vessel as she appeared to be laying a smoke screen to obscure her smaller sister; Haddock silenced the lead boat's forward gun. Inside of ten minutes, the Americans' fire began to tell, as the first quarry began to burn; smoke began obscuring her from view. Haddock, meanwhile, shifted fire to No.3 Showa Maru, noting one particularly defiant Japanese sailor firing back with a rifle, while Sennet, being blanked out by Lagarto, swung left in a full circle and fell in astern of the pack commander's boat, shifting her fire to Haddock's target as well.

As No.3 Showa Maru began to burn, however, the smoke cleared away from the larger guard boat, revealing her still under way and full of fight. Sennet "commenced hot pursuit" of No.8 Kotoshiro Maru. Lagarto likewise closed the range with the larger patrol vessel, opening up with her 40-millimeter guns at 2,000 yards (1,800 m); by 06:45, No.8 Kotoshiro Maru's guns had fallen silent and she wallowed in the sea, burning fiercely, while No.3 Showa Maru likewise lay in extremis. Haddock, having expended the last of her 5-inch (13 cm) ammunition, headed for the latter, lying riddled and burning, to finish her off, but No.3 Showa Maru sank before the submariners could man her 40-millimeter guns. Haddock circled the wreckage several times "to see if we could pick up any Japs or material but neither could be found." Sennet neared No.8 Kotoshiro Maru's side "to see if anything worth salvaging was left", but apparently found it "too hot" and pulled clear. Latta ordered her to sink the wreck. Sennet hastened No.8 Kotoshiro Maru's demise with "a couple rounds of 5" from close range."

"Latta's Lancers" having summarily disposed of the two guard boats (there were no survivors from either Japanese vessel) with no loss to themselves, Lagarto, Haddock, and Sennet formed a scouting line and continued their search. A little less than four hours later, a lookout in Lagarto spotted a patrolling "Betty" (Mitsubishi G4M Type 0 land attack plane) crossing astern, heading for Haddock; Lagarto submerged; Haddock spotted the Betty and did likewise; both boats logged the presence of explosions that, fortunately, caused no damage.

During the first dog watch on 13 February 1945, a lookout in Haddock, despite poor visibility conditions, spotted two more guard boats lying-to about 10,000 yards (9,100 m) distant. Sending a contact report to her two pack-mates, Haddock maintained contact as the day went on. Lagarto exchanged calls with Sennet on the SJ, and ordered that boat to close Haddock. "Our choice of direction is biased", Latta later explained, "neither boat [Lagarto nor Sennet] having a sight in two days". At 22:49 Lagarto contacted Haddock by the SJ. "When within range of good SCR communication [such as had facilitated the destruction of No.8 Kotoshiro Maru and No.3 Showa Maru] [Latta] outlined to both skippers a plan previously proposed by Commander [George E.] Porter [Jr., Sennet's commanding officer.]" Since Haddock had expended the last of her 5-inch (13 cm) ammunition in the engagement with the two pickets that morning, Latta ordered her to maintain contact while Lagarto and Sennet opened to the westward as before. Those two boats would strike at dawn with gunfire and Haddock would make a close range submerged torpedo attack. Ironically, Haddock's skipper, Commander William H. Brockman Jr., had arrived at the same solution independently.

==== 14 February ====
Lagarto began her easterly approach for the attack at 05:50 on 14 February 1945. "No likelihood of bright eastern sky today", her commanding officer later recounted, "all heavy gray overcast and seas less favorable to gun firing." Going to "battle surface" 15 minutes later, Lagarto opened fire on the right-hand vessel at 5,600 yards (5,100 m), swinging to the right to bring both of her 5-inch (13 cm) mounts to bear, "cold seas washing over [the] gun crews." The Japanese fought back more spiritedly than the day before. "Return fire heavier than yesterday", Latta noted in his patrol report, "but targets slower getting under way." Sennet reported numerous holes in her superstructure and one man wounded from the "extremely accurate" fire, but Lagarto emerged from the encounter unscathed. Haddock fired one torpedo at 300 yards (270 m) at one of the guard boats, but missed. Lagarto and Sennet, having expended the last of their 5-inch (13 cm) ammunition, broke off the action by 07:00 and stood away from the scene of the action, leaving behind one guard boat, No.3 Kanno Maru (98 tons), damaged.

==== 20 February ====
Detaching Sennet to proceed to her assigned patrol area and Haddock to hers, Lagarto proceeded to carry out the remainder of her patrol. Outside aircraft sightings on 17, 19 February and 20 February, it seemed devoid of contacts until the forenoon watch on 24 February 1945 off Okino Shima. Identifying a "RO-class submarine" at 10:58, Lagarto maneuvered into position and launched four torpedoes at 11:18; she logged the sound of what appeared to be an explosion on the target, and a second explosion that seemed to reflect the impact of the torpedo with an underwater cliff. Her quarry got off a report: "Torpedo attack in position 32-41N., 132-36E. Damage sustained..." The target's screws appeared to stop shortly after the explosion, followed less than ten minutes later by a "heavy underwater explosion like [a] collapsed hull..." The identity of Lagarto's victim appears to have been the Japanese submarine I-371 (Lieutenant Kamijukoku Yasuo), that had departed Truk for Yokosuka on 31 January 1945. However, the credit of the 880-ton merchantman Tatsumomo Maru to Lagarto seems questionable in view of Lagarto's only carrying out one attack on one target, reported as a submarine, in excellent visibility conditions. Sweeping the area with her periscope soon thereafter, Lagarto saw only empty ocean. Later that day, she heard "distant, heavy depth charge explosions", prompting Latta to write: "Hope Haddock is not paying for our attack..."

Lagarto submerged to conduct a patrol of Van Diemen Strait the following day, 25 February 1945, and the heavy seas encountered rendered control difficult; she encountered 8–10-degree rolls at depths of 8 feet (2.4 m) between periscope observations. She conducted a submerged patrol off Bungo Suido the next day, sighting a veritable parade of guard boats similar to those encountered and destroyed less than a fortnight before. She photographed the nearest one (2,500 yards) and later, "nothing following these lads", secured from battle stations. On the 27th, she encountered what she reported as a midget submarine without success. Ultimately, a few more fruitless days passed, after which she exchanged patrol areas with Haddock on 7 March.

==== 13 March ====
Ultimately departing her patrol area on 13 March 1945, bound for Subic Bay and a refit, Lagarto shaped course for a rendezvous with Haddock the following morning. At 06:12 on 14 March, Lagarto sighted a submarine through her high periscope, and began calling Haddock on the SCR. At 06:48, however, Lagarto sighted another submarine on an opposite bearing. "One of them", Latta later recounted, "is probably enemy—but which?"

Establishing voice communication with Haddock at 07:03 identified her as the first contact, so Lagarto advised her sister boat of the second—obviously enemy—contact. Hobbled by her number two main engine being temporarily out of commission, Lagarto ("Haddock has four engines to our three", Latta lamented) directed Haddock to make an end-around and then attack once she had achieved a favorable position to do so. Tracking the enemy all morning allowed Lagarto to improve the bearing, identifying her as an "I-class submarine." Decreasing the range, both American boats gained on the enemy, but "Haddock found a few more turns and began to pull ahead rapidly." Latta wished Commander Brockman luck. Ultimately, however, the Japanese boat frustrated the Americans' designs, submerging and escaping both. "After [a] final talk with Comdr. Brockman and mutual well-wishing", Latta wrote subsequently, "[Lagarto] took departure and set course for previously assigned route to Subic Bay."

Lagarto joined her escort, Douglas A. Munro an hour into the morning watch on 20 March 1945, and after anchoring for a sound test in Subic Bay, moored alongside the submarine tender Howard W. Gilmore to commence a refit. She returned from patrol "clean and shipshape with a minimum number of material defects."

=== April – May 1945 ===
Lagarto departed Subic Bay on 12 April 1945, bound for the South China Sea, and received orders on 27 April to patrol the outer waters of the Gulf of Siam. A little under an hour into the forenoon watch on 2 May, Baya exchanged calls with Lagarto by SJ radar. Later, an hour into the afternoon watch on 2 May, Baya sighted a Consolidated PB4Y-2 Privateer and contacted him by VHF. While "he had no dope for us", Baya's skipper wrote later, the submarine informed the aviators of the proximity of Lagarto and Caiman. At 20:55, Baya again exchanged calls with Lagarto; less than an hour later, she slowed to take soundings, recording seven fathoms. She changed course to parallel the coast.

==== 2 May ====
Baya's SJ picked up four contacts at 15,000 yards (14,000 m) at 21:55 on 2 May 1945; her battle stations tracking party took their places. At 22:10, Baya sent a contact report to Lagarto. Latta responded at 22:45 that his boat was in contact with a convoy, tracking it on a base course of 310° (T), speed nine knots (17 km/h), running along the 5 to 7 fathom curve (10 m). There was one large ship, one medium, and two escorts, both of which appeared to be equipped with 10-centimeter radar. Beneath a clear, dark, sky, Baya began her attack at 12 knots (22 km/h) through the flat sea, from off the convoy's starboard bow, setting her torpedoes to run at four feet. Soon she began encountering SJ and 10-centimeter radar interference "all around the dial". Two additional contacts materialized—one turned out to be a large three-masted junk, the other proved to be Lagarto. Baya, however, soon had her hands full; as her commanding officer later reported: "Jap gunnery poor but plenty of it. Tracers passing down both sides of the periscope shears and overhead..." Both escort vessels—one of which Baya identified as a "Shiretaka-type minelayer"—gave a good account of themselves; at 23:33, Baya informed Lagarto "that we had been driven off by gunfire." Baya's skipper later ruminated: "It is nothing short of a miracle that we came through so much gun fire without a single hit." "We were in a continuous hail of lead, fire, and steel and sustained not a scratch."

==== 3 May ====
During the mid watch on 3 May 1945, Baya rendezvoused with Lagarto and their captains discussed plans. The latter's proposed to dive on the convoy's track to make contact at 14:00, in the middle of the afternoon watch; Baya would be 10 to 15 miles (24 km) further along the track, "if no contact was made we [Baya] were to intercept at 20:00 at convoy’s possible 21:30 position." That having been arranged, the boats set course for their arranged stations.

At 15:00 on 3 May 1945, Baya sent the first "of numerous contact reports to Lagarto." By 23:47, "having sent Lagarto contact reports almost half hourly with no receipt", Baya decided to go it alone. Again, however, the Japanese escorts drove off Baya when she attacked during the mid watch on 4 May, again saving their charges from destruction.

Post-war examination of Japanese records revealed the most likely reason for Lagarto's silence. One of the two escorts, the minelayer Hatsutaka, made an attack on 3 May against a submerged submarine in 30 fathoms (180 ft; 55 m) of water at 7°55′N 102°00′E.

Announced as "overdue from patrol and presumed lost" on 10 August 1945, Lagarto was stricken from the Naval Vessel Register on 1 September 1945.

== Discovery of wreck, 2005–2006 ==
In May 2005, a group of private deep-sea divers, led by British wreck diver Jamie MacLeod, discovered the wreck in 70 metres (230 ft) of water in the Gulf of Thailand. The wreck is mostly intact and sitting upright on the ocean floor. During the dive, a large rupture was discovered on the port bow area, suggesting a depth charge as the catalyst to her sinking. Also observed during the dive was an open torpedo tube door, with an empty torpedo tube behind it, suggesting the possibility that Lagarto fired off a torpedo shortly before her sinking.

In June 2006, Navy divers from USS Salvor surveyed and photographed the wreck for six days. More evidence was seen that the wreck was Lagarto. A pair of 5-inch gun mounts were seen on the forward and rear parts of the ship. "Manitowoc" was seen on the propellers, providing a connection to the Manitowoc, Wisconsin shipyard where Lagarto was built. The pictures were sent back to naval archeologists for further review. After viewing the evidence provided by the Salvor divers, it was confirmed that this was indeed Lagarto.

== Awards ==
Lagarto received one battle star for World War II service.

== See also ==
- List of submarines of the United States Navy
