= USS Spikefish =

Submarine of the United States

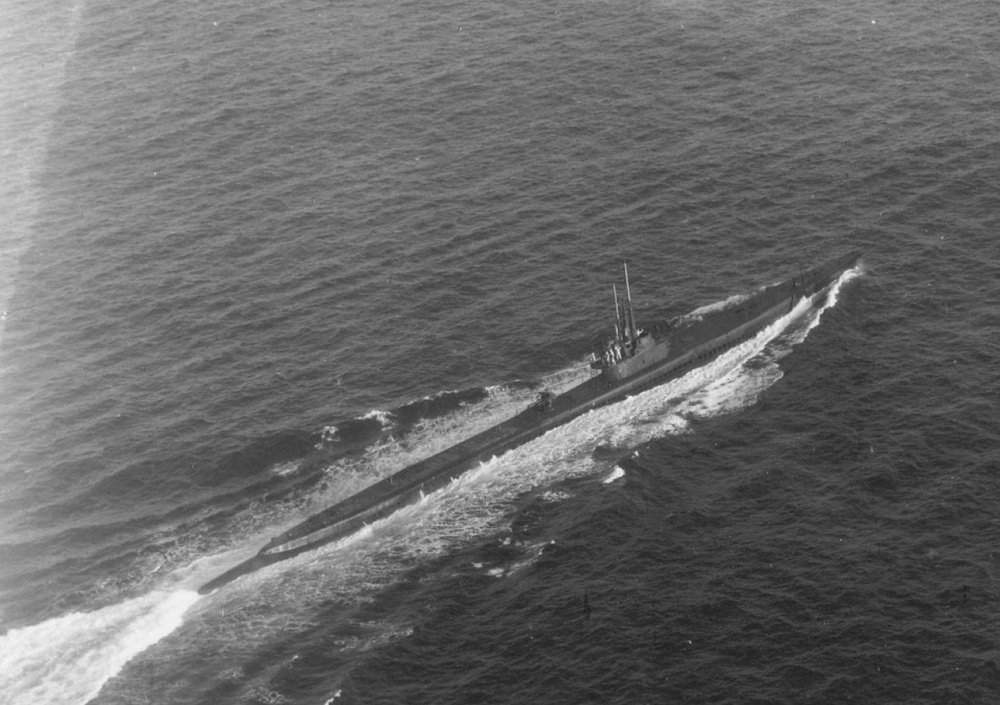
- Spikefish (SS-404) underway.

History

United States
- Builder: Portsmouth Naval Shipyard, Kittery, Maine
- Laid down: 29 January 1944
- Launched: 26 April 1944
- Commissioned: 30 June 1944
- Decommissioned: 2 April 1963
- Stricken: 1 May 1963
- Fate: Sunk as a target off Long Island, 4 August 1964

General characteristics
- Class & type: Balao class diesel-electric submarine
- Displacement: 1,526 tons (1,550 t) surfaced; 2,391 tons (2,429 t) submerged
- Length: 311 ft 6 in (94.95 m)
- Beam: 27 ft 3 in (8.31 m)
- Draft: 16 ft 10 in (5.13 m) maximum
- Propulsion: 4 × Fairbanks-Morse Model 38D8-⅛ 10-cylinder opposed piston diesel engines driving electrical generators; 2 × 126-cell Sargo batteries; 4 × high-speed Elliott electric motors with reduction gears; two propellers; 5,400 shp (4.0 MW) surfaced; 2,740 shp (2.0 MW) submerged
- Speed: 20.25 knots (38 km/h) surfaced; 8.75 kn (16 km/h) submerged
- Range: 11,000 nmi surfaced at 10 knots; (20,000 km at 19 km/h)
- Endurance: 48 hours at 2 knots (3.7 km/h) submerged; 75 days on patrol
- Test depth: 400 ft (120 m)
- Complement: 10 officers, 70–71 enlisted
- Armament: 10 × 21-inch (533 mm) torpedo tubes; 6 forward, 4 aft; 24 torpedoes; 1 × 5-inch (127 mm) / 25 caliber deck gun; Bofors 40 mm and Oerlikon 20 mm cannon

USS Spikefish (SS/AGSS-404), a Balao-class submarine, was a ship of the United States Navy, named for the spikefish. She was the first United States submarine to record 10,000 dives.

== World War II Service ==
Spikefish was laid down on 29 January 1944 by the Portsmouth Navy Yard in Kittery, Maine; launched on 26 April 1944, sponsored by Mrs. Harvey W. Moore, and commissioned on 30 June 1944.

She outfitted there until 31 July when she moved to the Portsmouth-New London area for training. The submarine departed Portsmouth on 16 September and proceeded via the Panama Canal to the Hawaiian Islands. Upon arriving at Pearl Harbor on 23 October, she began preparation for her first war patrol.

Spikefish got underway on 15 November 1944 for the Kuril Islands and the Sea of Okhotsk. She encountered no enemy shipping during the patrol which ended at Midway Island on 1 January 1945. On 26 January, she sailed for the Ryukyus and began patrolling westward of that group.

On 24 February, the submarine made a submerged attack on a convoy of six cargo ships with four escorts. She fired six torpedoes at two of the freighters, three of which were heard to hit, but results were not observed as Spikefish was forced to go deep and weather out a four-hour attack of about 80 depth charges. She sighted another convoy on 5 March and expended six torpedoes in a fruitless attack which led to another pounding by escorts. Spikefish was ordered to terminate her patrol on 6 March, and she returned to Pearl Harbor on 19 March.

One month later, Spikefish, under Cdr. Robert R. Managhan, sailed with Dragonet (SS-293) for Guam, topped off with fuel, and proceeded independently, on 3 May, toward an area off the east coast of Formosa where she assumed lifeguard station duties. She made no rescues during this period and sighted only one enemy ship. That occurred on the night of 14 May, and all four torpedoes that she fired missed the target. On 29 May, Spikefish was ordered to take station off Sakishima Gunto and act as lifeguard for carrier planes in the area. On 5 June, she bombarded Miyara airstrip on Ishigaki Jima with her 5-inch (130 mm) gun. Two days later, the submarine rescued a downed pilot whose plane had crashed after taking off from escort carrier, Sargent Bay (CVE-83). She returned to Guam on 13 June.

Spikefish began her last war patrol on 8 July with an uneventful patrol in the Yellow Sea and lifeguard duty off Shanghai. On 24 July, she bombarded Surveyor Island, off the China coast, in an attempt to destroy an enemy radar station. Shortly after midnight on 11 August, she located a small Japanese cargo ship near her lifeguard station but could not make positive identification at night. The ship was dead in the water, so Spikefish waited until morning, identified it as enemy and sank it with gunfire. Three survivors were brought on board. On the night of 13 August about 190 nmi (350 km) southeast of Shanghai, she made radar contact with a surfaced submarine. After tracking it for about an hour, the submarine submerged and disappeared from Spikefish's scope. At 00:07, contact was regained and the submarine was tracked until morning, when she was sighted on the surface. Her silhouette proved her to be Japanese. Spikefish fired six torpedoes. Two hit the target, which sank in a cloud of smoke at 29°02′N 123°53′E. The sole survivor who was taken prisoner identified the submarine as I-373; she was the last Japanese submarine sunk in the war.

== End of War ==
On 15 August, an order was received to cease all attacks, as Japan had agreed to surrender. The submarine delivered her prisoners to Saipan on 21 August and proceeded to Pearl Harbor, On 6 September, she and Hoe (SS-258) sailed for the east coast of the United States. Spikefish transited the Panama Canal on 23 September and arrived at New London, Conn. on 29 September. She was in drydock at the Portsmouth Navy Yard from 1 November 1945 to 15 February 1946. Upon her return to New London, her home port, she was assigned to Submarine Squadron 2 and trained personnel of the submarine school.

== Post War service and fate ==
Her training duty was interrupted by an overhaul from 7 April to 22 September 1947; a cruise to Bermuda from 25 September to 2 October 1947; and another overhaul at Philadelphia Naval Shipyard from 16 May to 8 July 1948. Spikefish operated from New London making training cruises along the east coast from Bermuda to Nova Scotia until 30 April 1955. On that day, she and Piper (SS-409) sailed for the Mediterranean and deployment with the 6th Fleet. Spikefish returned to New London on 8 October 1955 and resumed her normal training duties until early 1963. On 18 March 1960, Spikefish became the first United States submarine to record 10,000 dives.

Spikefish was redesignated an Auxiliary Research Submarine and renumbered AGSS-404 (auxiliary, submarine) in 1962. She was decommissioned at Key West, Florida on 2 April 1963 and was stricken from the Navy list on 1 May 1963. She was subsequently sunk as a target in August 1964 off Long Island, New York.

Spikefish received three battle stars for World War II service.
