= Japanese submarine I-371 =

History

Japan
- Name: Submarine No. 5471
- Builder: Mitsubishi, Kobe, Japan
- Laid down: 22 March 1944
- Launched: 21 July 1944
- Renamed: I-371 on 21 July 1944
- Completed: 2 October 1944
- Commissioned: 2 October 1944
- Fate: Missing February 1945; Probably sunk 24 February 1945
- Stricken: 10 April 1945

General characteristics
- Class & type: Type D1 submarine
- Displacement: 1,440 long tons (1,463 t) surfaced; 2,215 long tons (2,251 t) submerged
- Length: 73.50 m (241 ft 2 in) overall
- Beam: 8.90 m (29 ft 2 in)
- Draft: 4.76 m (15 ft 7 in)
- Propulsion: 2 × Kampon Mk.23B Model 8 diesels; 1,850 bhp surfaced; 1,200 shp submerged; 2 shafts
- Speed: 13.0 knots (24.1 km/h) surfaced; 6.5 knots (12.0 km/h) submerged
- Range: 15,000 nmi (28,000 km) at 10 knots (19 km/h) surfaced; 120 nmi (220 km) at 3 knots (5.6 km/h) submerged
- Test depth: 75 m (246 ft)
- Boats & landing craft carried: 2 x Daihatsu-class landing craft
- Capacity: 85 tons freight
- Complement: 55
- Sensors & processing systems: 1 × Type 22 surface search radar; 1 × Type 13 early warning radar
- Armament: 1 × 14 cm/40 11th Year Type naval gun; 2 × Type 96 25mm AA guns

I-371 was an Imperial Japanese Navy Type D1 transport submarine. Completed and commissioned in October 1944, she served in World War II and was sunk while returning from her first transport mission in February 1945.

== Construction and commissioning ==
I-371 was laid down on 22 March 1944 by Mitsubishi at Kobe, Japan, with the name Submarine No. 5471. She was launched on 21 July 1944 and renamed I-371 that day. She was completed and commissioned on 2 October 1944.

== Service history ==
Upon commissioning, I-371 was attached to the Sasebo Naval District and was assigned to Submarine Squadron 11 for workups. She was reassigned to Submarine Squadron 7 on 6 December 1944. During December 1944, she moved from the Seto Inland Sea to Yokosuka and began a 20-day period of workups from there.

=== Transport voyage ===
On 30 December 1944, I-371 departed Yokosuka bound for Truk and Mereyon Island at Woleai in the Caroline Islands on her first transport mission, carrying a cargo of 50 metric tons of food and mail, as well as aviation gasoline, spare parts, and ammunition for the Truk-based 171st Naval Air Group, which the aviators required to resume flights by Nakajima C6N1 Saiun ("Iridescent Cloud"; Allied reporting name "Myrt") reconnaissance aircraft over the American fleet anchorage at Ulithi Atoll. She arrived at Truk on 18 January 1945 and unloaded the portion of her cargo destined for Truk. During her stay, an Aichi E13A1 (Allied reporting name "Jake") floatplane arrived from Mereyon on 20 January 1945 with a coded message about I-371′s planned arrival there.

On 22 January 1945 I-371 got underway from Truk bound for Mereyon, which she reached at around 22:00 on 25 January 1945. She unloaded 50 metric tons of food and mail, allowing an increase in the daily ration of rice for each member of the starving Japanese garrison on Mereyon from 5 to 7 ounces (140 to 200 g). She completed unloading her cargo at 03:00 on 26 January 1945 and headed back to Truk, where she arrived on 28 January 1945. She embarked some passengers and put back to sea, bound for Japan, with an estimated arrival date of 21 February 1945. She never arrived.

=== Loss ===
The circumstances of I-371′s loss are not clear. At 11:13 on 24 February 1945, the United States Navy submarine USS Lagarto (SS-371) was operating in the Bungo Strait off the coast of Japan when she detected a surfaced submarine on radar at a range of 5,000 yards (4,600 m). Lagarto sank the submarine at 32°40′N 132°33′E. Her victim probably was I-371, although I-371 would have been running three days behind schedule to be in that location at that time. Other accounts credit the destroyer USS Haggard (DD-555) with sinking I-371 off Okinawa on 23 March 1945, but that was 11 days after the Japanese had declared I-371 missing, and it is more likely that Haggard sank the submarine Ro-41.

On 12 March 1945, the Imperial Japanese Navy declared I-371 to be presumed lost in the vicinity of Truk along with all 84 crew and passengers on board. She was stricken from the Navy list on 10 April 1945.

== Sources ==
- Hackett, Bob & Kingsepp, Sander. IJN Submarine I-371: Tabular Record of Movement. Retrieved on September 19, 2020.
