= Japanese submarine I-368 =

History

Japan
- Name: Submarine No. 5468
- Builder: Yokosuka Navy Yard, Yokosuka, Japan
- Laid down: 15 July 1943
- Renamed: I-368 on 25 January 1944
- Launched: 29 January 1944
- Completed: 25 August 1944
- Commissioned: 25 August 1944
- Fate: Sunk 27 February 1945
- Stricken: 10 April 1945

General characteristics
- Class & type: Type D1 submarine
- Displacement: 1,440 long tons (1,463 t) surfaced; 2,215 long tons (2,251 t) submerged
- Length: 73.50 m (241 ft 2 in) overall
- Beam: 8.90 m (29 ft 2 in)
- Draft: 4.76 m (15 ft 7 in)
- Propulsion: 2 × Kampon Mk.23B Model 8 diesels; 1,850 bhp surfaced; 1,200 shp submerged; 2 shafts
- Speed: 13.0 knots (24.1 km/h) surfaced; 6.5 knots (12.0 km/h) submerged
- Range: 15,000 nmi (28,000 km) at 10 knots (19 km/h) surfaced; 120 nmi (220 km) at 3 knots (5.6 km/h) submerged
- Test depth: 75 m (246 ft)
- Boats & landing craft carried: 2 x Daihatsu-class landing craft (removed January 1945)
- Capacity: 85 tons freight
- Complement: 55
- Sensors & processing systems: 1 × Type 22 surface search radar; 1 × Type 13 early warning radar
- Armament: 1 × 14 cm/40 11th Year Type naval gun (removed January 1945); 2 × Type 96 25mm AA guns; 5 x kaiten suicide attack torpedoes (added January 1945)

I-368 was an Imperial Japanese Navy Type D1 transport submarine. Completed and commissioned in August 1944, she served in World War II and was converted into a kaiten suicide attack torpedo carrier in January 1945. She was sunk in February 1945 while operating during the Battle of Iwo Jima.

== Construction and commissioning ==
I-368 was laid down on 15 July 1943 by Yokosuka Navy Yard at Yokosuka, Japan, with the name Submarine No. 5468. She was renamed I-368 on 25 January 1944 and provisionally attached to the Sasebo Naval District that day. She was launched on 29 January 1944 and was attached formally to the Sasebo Naval District that day. She was completed and commissioned on 25 August 1944.

== Service history ==
Upon commissioning, I-368 was assigned to Submarine Squadron 11 for workups. On 2 November 1944 she was reassigned to Submarine Squadron 7.

In January 1945, I-368 was converted from a transport submarine into a kaiten suicide attack torpedo carrier, the conversion involving the removal of her 140-millimeter (5.5 in) deck gun and Daihatsu-class landing craft and their replacement with fittings allowing her to carry five kaitens on her deck, On 10 January 1945, she and the submarine I-370 took part in simulated kaiten attacks against towed targets in the Seto Inland Sea that lasted 15 days.

The Battle of Iwo Jima began on 19 February 1945 when U.S. forces landed on Iwo Jima. The landings had occurred sooner that the Japanese expected, so they ordered I-368 to cease kaiten training early and formed the Chihaya Kaiten Group, made up of I-368, I-370, and the submarine I-44, with orders to proceed to the waters off Iwo Jima and attack American ships there. On 20 February 1945, I-368 became the first kaiten carrier to get underway for Iwo Jima, departing the kaiten base at Hikari.

I-368 was dead in the water on the surface 35 nautical miles (65 km; 40 mi) west of Iwo Jima at 03:05 on 27 February 1945 when a United States Navy Grumman TBM-1C Avenger torpedo bomber of Composite Squadron 82 (VC-82) operating from the escort aircraft carrier USS Anzio (CVE-57) detected her on radar. The Avenger overshot I-368 on its first pass, and she submerged. The Avenger returned and dropped a float light marker and sonobuoys, followed by a Mark 24 "Fido" acoustic homing torpedo. At 03:38, I-368′s conning tower briefly broke the surface near the float light marker, but she quickly dived again. Another Avenger arrived on the scene and dropped more sonobuoys and another Fido, which sank I-368 at 24°43′N 140°37′E. All 86 men on board were lost.

On 6 March 1945, the Japanese ordered I-368 to return to Japan, but she never acknowledged the order. On 14 March 1945, the Imperial Japanese Navy declared I-368 to be presumed lost with all hands off Iwo Jima, although she nonetheless was officially transferred from Submarine Squadron 7 to Submarine Division 15 when Submarine Squadron 7 was deactivated on 20 March 1945. She was stricken from the Navy list on 10 April 1945.

== Sources ==
- Hackett, Bob & Kingsepp, Sander. IJN Submarine I-368: Tabular Record of Movement. Retrieved on September 16, 2020.
