= Japanese submarine I-361 =

1943 Type D1 submarine

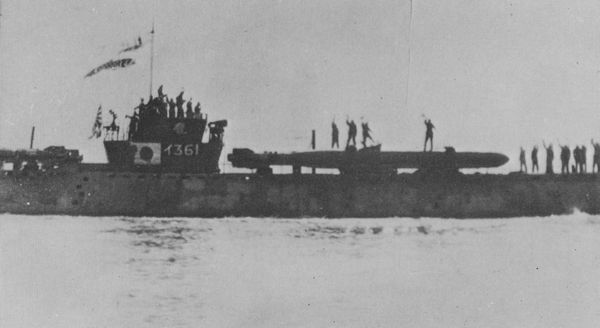
- I-361 departing Hikari Naval Base on 24 May 1945.

History

Japan
- Name: Submarine No. 5461
- Builder: Kure Naval Arsenal, Kure, Japan
- Laid down: 16 February 1943
- Renamed: I-361 on 20 October 1943
- Launched: 30 October 1943
- Completed: 25 May 1944
- Commissioned: 25 May 1944
- Fate: Sunk 31 May 1945
- Stricken: 10 August 1945

General characteristics
- Class & type: Type D1 submarine
- Displacement: 1,440 long tons (1,463 t) surfaced; 2,215 long tons (2,251 t) submerged
- Length: 73.50 m (241 ft 2 in) overall
- Beam: 8.90 m (29 ft 2 in)
- Draft: 4.76 m (15 ft 7 in)
- Propulsion: 2 × Kampon Mk.23B Model 8 diesels; 1,850 bhp surfaced; 1,200 shp submerged; 2 shafts
- Speed: 13.0 knots (24.1 km/h) surfaced; 6.5 knots (12.0 km/h) submerged
- Range: 15,000 nmi (28,000 km) at 10 knots (19 km/h) surfaced; 120 nmi (220 km) at 3 knots (5.6 km/h) submerged
- Test depth: 75 m (246 ft)
- Boats & landing craft carried: 2 x Daihatsu-class landing craft (removed February–May 1945)
- Capacity: 85 tons freight
- Complement: 55
- Sensors & processing systems: 1 × Type 22 surface search radar; 1 × Type 13 early warning radar
- Armament: 2 × 533 mm (21 in) torpedo tubes; 2 × Type 95 torpedoes; 1 × 14 cm/40 11th Year Type naval gun (removed February–May 1945); 2 × Type 96 25mm AA guns; 5 x kaiten suicide attack torpedoes (added February–May 1945)

I-361 was an Imperial Japanese Navy Type D1 transport submarine. Completed and commissioned in May 1944, she served in World War II and conducted transport missions between Japan and Wake Island until she was converted into a kaiten suicide attack torpedo carrier 1945. She was sunk during her first kaiten mission in May 1945.

== Construction and commissioning ==
I-361 was laid down on 16 February 1943 by the Kure Naval Arsenal at Kure, Japan, with the name Submarine No. 5461. She was renamed I-361 on 20 October 1943 and provisionally attached to the Yokosuka Naval District that day. She was launched on 30 October 1943 and was attached formally to the Yokosuka Naval District that day. She was completed and commissioned on 25 May 1944.

== Service history ==
Upon commissioning, I-361 was assigned to Submarine Squadron 11 for workups. With her workups complete, she was reassigned to Submarine Squadron 7 on 15 August 1944.

=== Transport missions ===
On 23 August 1944, I-361 departed Yokosuka bound for Wake Island on her first transport mission. She arrived at Wake Island on 7 September 1944, discharged 70 tons of cargo, embarked 30 passengers, and got back underway the same day for her return voyage. She arrived at Yokosuka on 17 September 1944. While in Japan, she briefly ran aground on 4 October 1944.

I-361 got underway from Yokosuka on 17 October 1944 for her second transport voyage, again setting course for Wake Island, which she reached on 29 October 1944. After unloading 67 tons of ammunition and taking five passengers aboard, she left the same day bound for Yokosuka, where she arrived on 9 November 1944.

On 9 January 1945, I-361 began her final supply voyage, again destined for Wake Island. Calling there on 22 January 1945, she unloaded her cargo, embarked passengers, and got back underway the same day. She arrived at Yokosuka on 7 February 1945.

=== Kaiten carrier ===
After returning to Japan, I-361 was converted from a transport submarine into a kaiten suicide attack torpedo carrier, the conversion involving the removal of her 140-millimeter (5.5 in) deck gun and Daihatsu-class landing craft and their replacement with fittings allowing her to carry five kaitens on her deck. On 20 March 1945, Submarine Squadron 7 was deactivated, and I-361 was reassigned to Submarine Division 15.

Between 26 and 29 March 1945, U.S. forces captured advanced bases and anchorages in the Kerama Islands southwest of Okinawa, and the Battle of Okinawa began when U.S. forces landed on Okinawa itself on 1 April 1945. By 24 May 1945, I-361 was part of the Todoroki ("Thunderclap") Kaiten Group along with the submarines I-36, I-165, and I-363. With five kaitens on board, she got underway from the kaiten base at Hikari that day bound for a patrol area southeast of Okinawa.

=== Loss ===
On 28 May 1945, a United States Navy minesweeper detected I-361. The minesweeper alerted the escort aircraft carrier USS Anzio (CVE-57) and the four destroyer escorts screening her of the contact, and Anzio and her escorts headed for the scene, with Anzio launching aircraft from her embarked Composite Squadron 13 (VC-13) to conduct a series of searches for I-361.

At 04:36 on 31 May 1945, a VC-13 TBM-1C Avenger torpedo bomber established radar contact on I-361, which was on the surface 400 nautical miles (740 km; 460 mi) southeast of Okinawa. Dropping out of a cloud, the Avenger sighted I-361 at a range of about 6,000 yards (5,500 m), misidentifying her as an "I-161-class submarine" without a deck gun and not reporting any kaitens on her deck. The Avenger fired four rockets at I-361, and the plane′s crew believed they had scored two hits. I-361 crash-dived. The Avenger then dropped sonobuoys and a Mark 24 "Fido" acoustic homing torpedo. The Fido homed in on I-361′s propeller noises and exploded. The approaching destroyer escort USS Oliver Mitchell (DE-417) felt a strong underwater shock 15 nautical miles (28 km; 17 mi) away, and when she and the destroyer escort USS Tabberer (DE-418) arrived on the scene of the sinking they sighted a heavy oil slick and floating debris. It marked the end of I-361, sunk with the loss of all 81 men on board — her entire crew of 76 and all five of her embarked kaiten pilots — at 20°22′N 134°09′E.

On 25 June 1945, the Imperial Japanese Navy declared I-361 to be presumed lost with all hands southeast of Okinawa. She was stricken from the Navy list on 10 August 1945.

== Sources ==
- Hackett, Bob & Kingsepp, Sander. IJN Submarine I-361: Tabular Record of Movement. Retrieved on September 17, 2020.
