= Daihatsu-class landing craft =

Japanese military landing craft

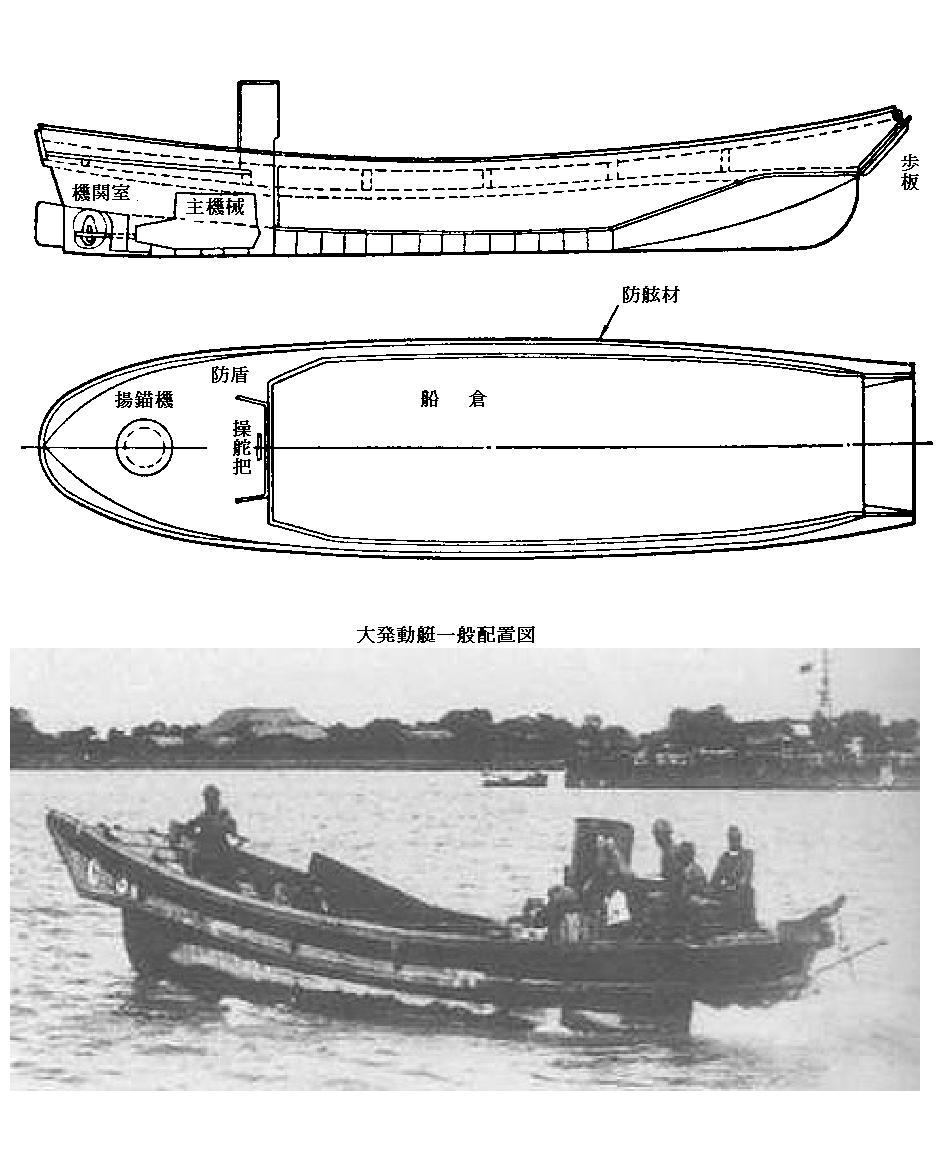

Class overview
- Name: Daihatsu class
- Operators: Imperial Japanese Army
- In service: 1937–1945
- Planned: 3,229

General characteristics (Daihatsu-class landing craft)
- Type: Landing craft
- Tonnage: 21 tons
- Length: 47 ft (14.33 m)o/a
- Beam: 10 ft (3.05 m)
- Draught: 2.6 ft (0.79 m)
- Installed power: 60 hp (45 kW)
- Propulsion: Diesel engine
- Speed: 8 knots (14.8 km/h)
- Range: 100 nautical miles (185 km) at 7.5 knots (13.9 km/h); 50 nautical miles (93 km) at 8.5 knots (15.7 km/h)
- Capacity: 1 Type 95 7.4 ton tank or 70 men or 10 tons cargo
- Complement: 12
- Armament: 2 light machine guns or 2-3 25mm/60 AA guns

The Daihatsu-class or 14 m landing craft (大発; abbreviation of 大型発動機艇 which means "large motorized boat") was a type of landing craft used by the Imperial Japanese Army from 1937 to 1945, in the Second Sino-Japanese War and World War II. It was designated the "Type A" landing craft by the United States.

== History ==
Daihatsu-class Landing Craft ((大発動艇, Daihatsudōtei; translated: Large Powered Boat) was a landing craft of the Imperial Japanese Army, originally developed in 1924, further refined later on and also adopted to the Imperial Japanese Navy service.

Boats were first used in combat on 29 February 1932, during the Shanghai incident landing IJA's 11th Division behind enemy lines blocking enemy from receiving supplies and reinforcements that led to a withdrawal of the Chinese 19th Route Army. This operation was studied carefully by USMC Victor Krulak, with photographs of the boats provided to Andrew Higgins who copied the design into LCVP.

Landing craft were built until the end of World War 2, with one of the last reported combat uses being a supply delivery on the Kaladan River. It took place on 10 May 1944, as a part of the U-Go offensive, where boats were camouflaged with bushes and armed with Type 92 heavy machine guns. An estimated 6000 boats were built for both the Imperial Japanese Army and Navy.

It had a bow ramp that was lowered to disembark cargo upon riding up onto a beach. After reviewing photos of a Daihatsu landing craft, this was adopted by American landing craft designer Andrew Higgins in developing the Landing Craft, Personnel (Large) (LCP(L)) into the Landing Craft, Personnel (Ramped) (LCP(R)) and later the Landing Craft, Vehicle and Personnel (LCVP). However, the Daihatsu landing craft was more seaworthy than an LCVP due to its hull design. It was constructed of a metal hull and powered by a diesel engine.

The landing craft could be modified to carry weapons of up to 37 mm (1.46 inch) caliber as armament and could be uparmoured against 40 mm fire. The 17 meter Toku Daihatsu-class landing craft was a lengthened version that was capable of carrying a medium-sized tank or two eight ton tanks.

== Gallery ==
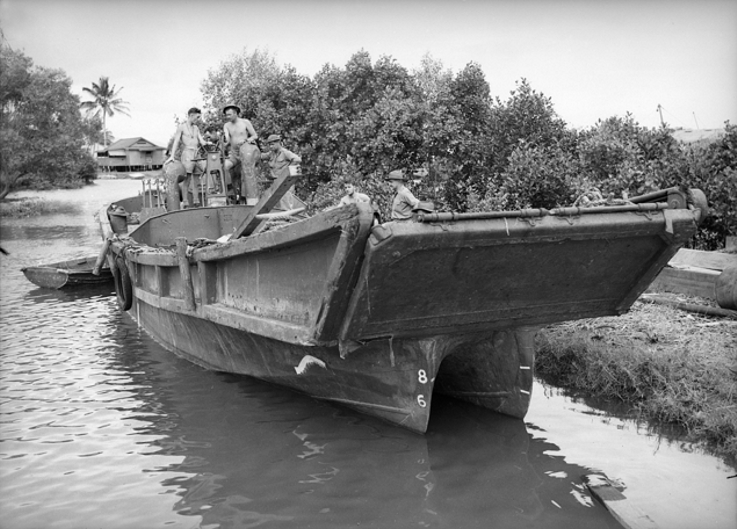
An example captured at the Battle of Milne Bay

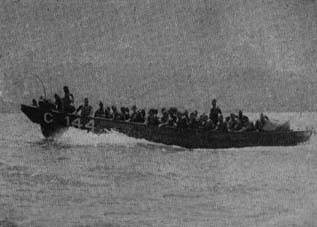
Imperial Japanese Army practicing landings with the Daihatsu landing craft, 1935.

== Bibliography ==
- Jentschura, Hansgeorg; Jung, Dieter; and Mickel, Peter. Translated by Brown, J.D. 1977. Warships of the Imperial Japanese Navy, 1869–1945. Naval Institute Press. ISBN 0-87021-893-X.
- Morison, Samuel Eliot. 1950. History of United States Naval Operations in World War II, Volume VI: Breaking the Bismarck Barrier, 22 July 1942 – 1 May 1942. Boston: Little, Brown, and Company.
- Parillo, Mark P. 1993. The Japanese Merchant Marine in World War II. Naval Institute Press. ISBN 1-55750-677-9
