= SS Absaroka =

Steamer in the United States Navy

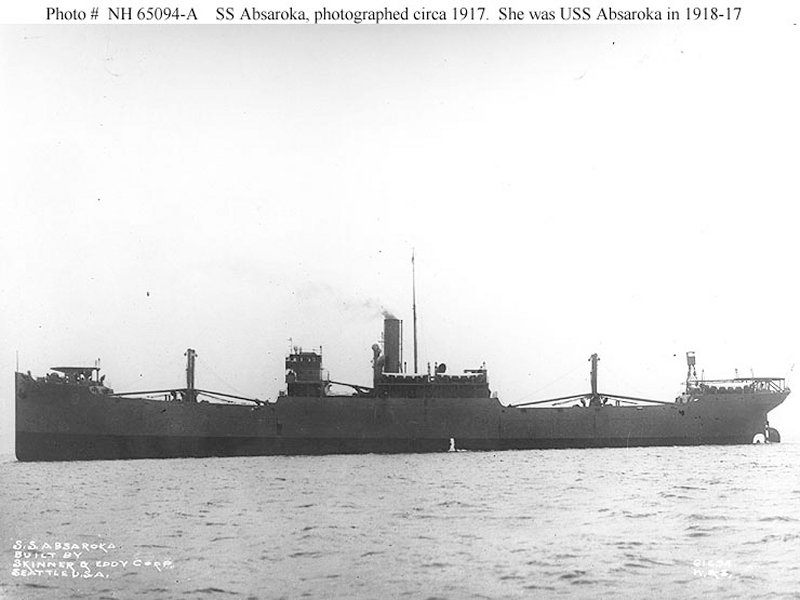
- USS Absaroka (ID-2518) probably photographed upon completion of construction, circa 1917

History
- Name: Absaroka (1917—1946); Prima Vista / Primavista (1946—1948); Panenterprise (1948—1952); Maryland (1952-1954)
- Namesake: Absaroka Range
- Owner: United States Shipping Board (1917—1927); McCormick Steamship Company (1927—1940); Pope & Talbot, Inc. (1940—1946); Samsco (Panama) (1946—1948); Primavista (Panama) (1948—1949); Mary Louisa (Panama) (1949—1952); Tidewater Commercial (Panama) (1952—1954)
- Port of registry: Seattle (1917—1927)
- Builder: Skinner & Eddy, Seattle
- Yard number: 15
- Laid down: 4 September 1917
- Launched: 22 December 1917
- Completed: 12 February 1918
- Identification: U.S. Official Number 215986; Code letters: LJQR (1917—1933); Call sign KGDG (1934–1946)
- Fate: Scrapped 1954
- Notes: U.S. Navy commissioned status: 17 September 1918—4 March 1919

General characteristics
- Type: Design 1013 cargo ship
- Tonnage: 5,641 GRT; 4,027 NRT; 8,521 DWT
- Displacement: 12,397 long tons (12,596 t)
- Length: 409.6 ft (124.8 m)
- Beam: 54.1 ft (16.5 m)
- Draft: 24 ft 6 in (7.47 m)
- Depth: 27.1 ft (8.3 m)
- Installed power: 2,500 ihp, 359 Nhp
- Propulsion: Seattle Machine Works 3-cylinder triple expansion engine
- Speed: 10.5 knots (12.1 mph; 19.4 km/h)
- Crew: Commercial: 45; NOTS: 70
- Notes: Ship armament, WW I; 1 × 6 in (150 mm) gun; 1 × 3 in (76 mm) gun

SS Absaroka was a steamer, named after the Absaroka Range of mountains in Montana and Wyoming, completed in February 1918 for the United States Shipping Board (USSB) which briefly operated the ship. From 17 September 1918 to 4 March 1919 the ship was commissioned as USS Absaroka with the identification number IX-2581 in United States Navy and operated by the Naval Overseas Transportation Service.

The ship was returned to the USSB which operated the vessel until sold in 1927 to McCormick Steamship Company. In 1940 Absaroka was sold to Pope & Talbot, Inc. which operated it until sold foreign in April 1946. On 24 December 1941 the ship was torpedoed and damaged by torpedo off the California coast. During World War II the War Shipping Administration (WSA) took control of all oceanic shipping with Absaroka delivered to WSA 9 May 1942 to be operated by Pope & Talbot for WSA under Army and general standard agreements. On 9 April 1946 the ship was redelivered to Pope & Talbot and sold 14 April 1946 to the Greek government and then operated as Prima Vista or Primavista until 1948. The ship was then sold to other foreign interests operating as Panenterprise to 1952 and finally Maryland until broken up in 1954.

== Construction ==
Absaroka was an Emergency Fleet Corporation (EFC) Design 1013 cargo ship built in 1917 for the United States Shipping Board (USSB) by Skinner & Eddy Company, Seattle, Washington as USSB number 84, yard number 15, U.S. Official Number 215986 with signal LJQR. The single 2,700 h.p. triple expansion steam engine was built by Seattle Machine Works.

== Operation ==
The USSB took delivery of Absaroka on completion in February 1918 for operation. On 17 September 1918 the ship was taken over by the Navy on a bare boat charter basis, assigned identification number IX-2581 and commissioned USS Absaroka under the command of Lieutenant commander O. W. Hughes for operation in the Naval Overseas Transportation Service (NOTS).

Between October 1918 and February 1919, the ship made two transatlantic voyages carrying Army cargo to ports in France, England, and the Netherlands. During her second trip, Absaroka rescued the captain and crew of the disabled British steamer War Marvel and landed them safely at Falmouth, England.

The ship arrived in New York City on 12 February 1919 and was immediately drydocked for overhaul. Absaroka was decommissioned on 4 March 1919 and returned to the United States Shipping Board. The USSB sold the ship with requirements for specified alterations and improvements to the McCormick Steamship Company for $131,000 before 30 June 1927. From 1927 to 1940 Absaroka was operated by McCormick which in 1935 was acquired by Pope & Talbot, Incorporated to become legally identified as the Pope & Talbot-McCormick Steamship Division. From 1940 the ship was operated as a lumber carrier under the Pope & Talbot identity. (Note: Both McCormick Steamship and Pope & Talbot originated in the Pacific Northwest lumber business. See the article Port Gamble, Washington sections Sale of Puget Mill Company and the next section Creation of Pope & Talbot Co. for some of the background. In 1946 the McCormick Steamship name, legally identified as the Pope & Talbot-McCormick Steamship Division, itself was absorbed into the Pope & Talbot identity.)

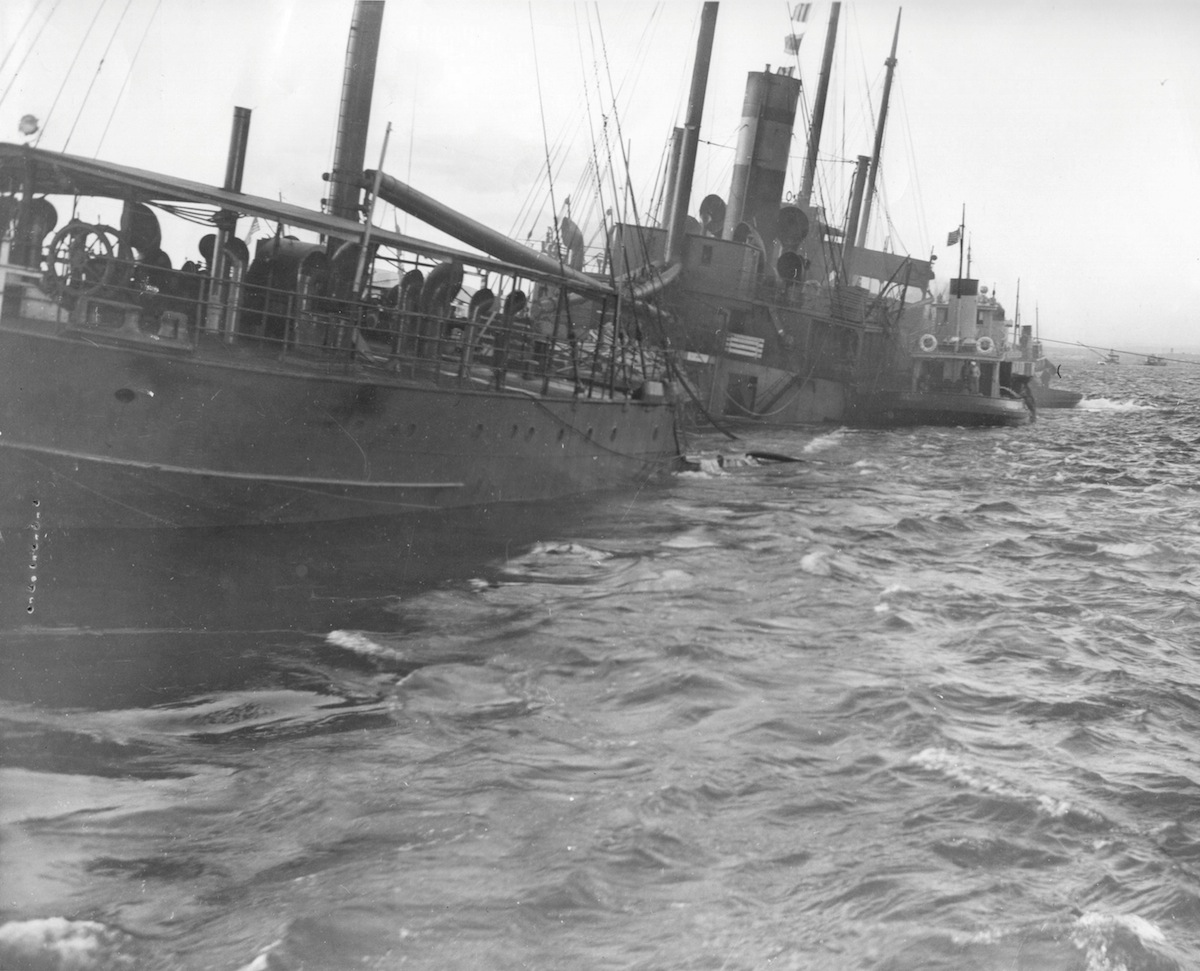
Absaroka listing to starboard following torpedo attack by Japanese submarine. December 1941.jpg

Absaroka was torpedoed and damaged by the Japanese submarine I-19 off Point Fermin, California, and beached off Fort MacArthur on 24 December 1941. The attack was one of the opening incidents of what is called the Battle of Los Angeles during which American merchant ships were attacked by Japanese submarines in waters off the West Coast from the last half of December 1941 through February 1942. Other ships attacked during this event were Agwiworld, Samoa escaped shelling and torpedoes as did Barbara Olson, Dorothy Phillips, Connecticut and Idaho but with damage. H.M. Storey escaped but sank later. Emidio, Montebello, Larry Doheny, Camden and Fort Camosun were sunk.

The ship was delivered to the War Shipping Administration on 9 May 1942 for operation by Pope & Talbot as the administration's agent. The operating agreement was for Army Transportation Corps requirements until 16 August 1943 when it was changed to a General Agency Agreement. On 9 April 1946 Absaroka was delivered to Pope & Talbot as owner at San Francisco.

== Post-war service ==
On 14 April 1946 Pope & Talbot sold Absaroka to the Greek government. It passed into the ownership of J A Cosmas, and was registered in Panama as Primavista or Prima Vista under the registered ownership of Compañia Marítima Samsoc Limitada S.A., Panama. (Note: Sources vary of whether it was Prima Vista or Primavista with MARAD and DANFS using Prima Vista, while Lloyd's Register of Shipping and later sources have Primavista.) In 1948 the vessel was sold to Primavista Compañia de Navegación S.A., under the management of Pietro Ruggiero, and remaining under the Panamanian flag as Panenterprise. In 1948-49 the ship made at least three trips from Europe to Buenos Aires and brought a small number of immigrants. The ship was again sold in 1952, again with Panamanian registration, and renamed Maryland in the ownership of The Tidewater Commercial Company Inc., based in Baltimore, Maryland, though controlled by the Italian shipowner Albert Ravano.

The ship was broken up in 1954, either by Patapsco Scrap Company at Baltimore, or by Shipbreaking Industries Ltd, Faslane, Scotland, arriving on 9 April.
