= SS Agwiworld =

Tanker Ship (1921 - 1946)

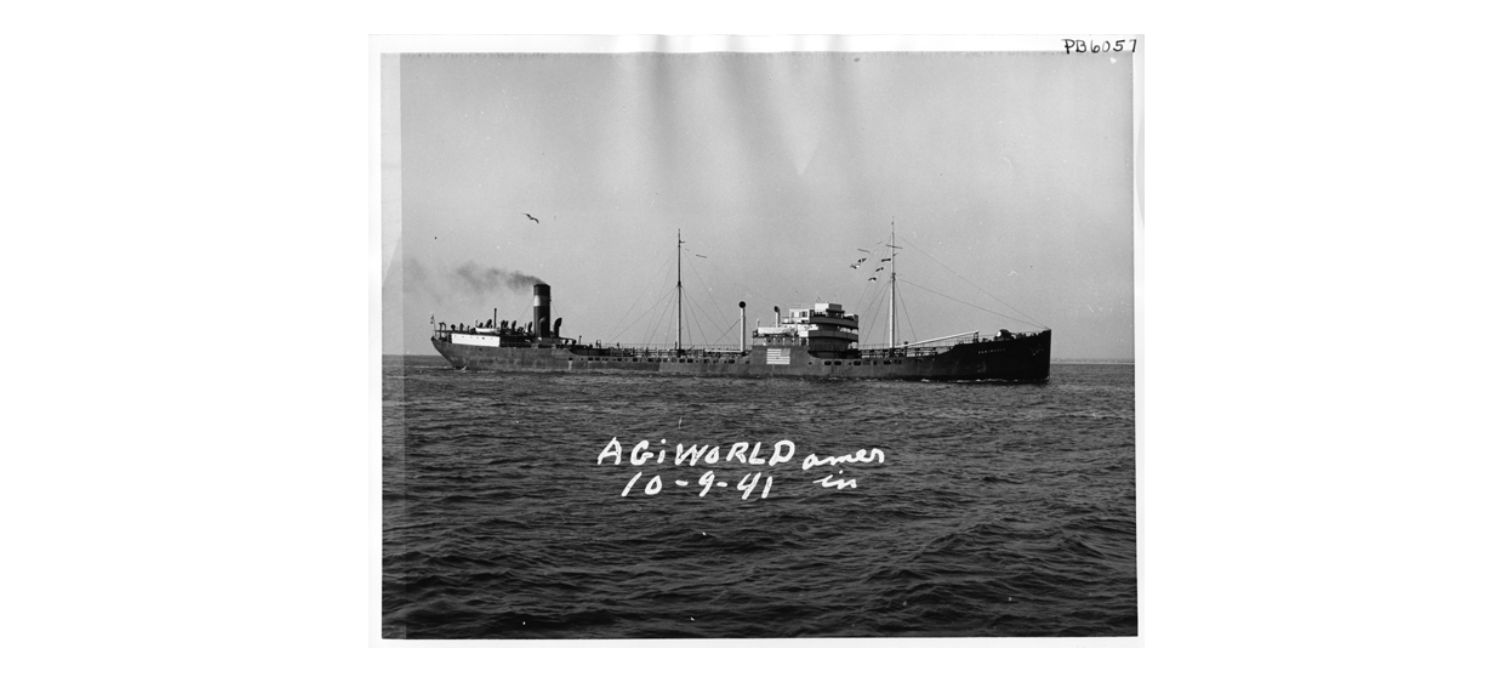
- SS Agwiworld in 1941

History

United States
- Name: Agwiworld
- Owner: Richfield Oil Company
- Operator: Richfield Oil Company
- Builder: Sun Shipbuilding
- Way number: 220911 - Hull # 32
- Laid down: July 28, 1920
- Launched: December 22, 1920
- Completed: January 19, 1921
- Home port: Los Angeles, California
- Identification: Call sign KDMD
- Fate: Scrapped in 1954

General characteristics
- Tonnage: 6,771 GRT; 10,600 DWT
- Length: 429
- Beam: 59
- Draught: 31
- Installed power: 3,800
- Speed: 10 knots (19 km/h; 12 mph)
- Complement: 31

SS Agwiworld was a tanker ship that was able to evade an attack off the coast of California in the early days of World War II. Agwiworld was built by Sun Shipbuilding in Chester, Pennsylvania on the Delaware River. Agwiworld's keel was laid down on July 28, 1920. The vessel was launched on December 22, 1920, and delivered on January 19, 1921. Agwiworld was owned and operated by Richfield Oil Company and homeport was Los Angeles, California.

After the Attack on Pearl Harbor on December 7, 1941 the United States entered World War II. The Imperial Japanese Navy sent submarines to attack ships off Coastal California. On December 20, 1941 at 2:15 pm the Agwiworld was 20 miles (32 km) off Cypress Point, Monterey Peninsula near Monterey Bay when the Japanese submarine I-23 fired 14 artillery shells at her from her single 14 cm (5.5 in) naval gun. The first shell missed and exploded off the stern, Captain Frederick Goncalves saw the sub 500 yards (460 m) to the west. Goncalves took evasive moves, zigzagging to avoid the incoming shells and to flee the site. Goncalves had a distress call sent to the US Navy. Captain Genichi Shibata of I-23 was not able to get off accurate fire, nor able to follow the Agwiworld, as the water was rough that day. The sub I-23 was faster than the Agwiworld, but with the heavy swells Shibata called off the attack. Shibata's gun crew were on the deck and the heavy swells risked washing his crew overboard. The deck gun had a range of 9.6 miles (15.4 km) and continued to fire as Agwiworld departed. Agwiworld steamed to Santa Cruz, away from the sub, looking for a safe port. After the sub fired its last shell, it submerged. People, including golfers, on the Monterey peninsula saw the shells exploding around the ship as she entered the bay still zigzagging at top speed. Salinas Air Base sent out observation planes to look for the sub, but due to poor visibility they found nothing. It is reported that the Japanese submarine I-23 was lost with all 96 crew members off Hawaii on February 28, 1942. In 1949 the Agwiworld was sold to Cia. Atlantica Pacifica S.A. (Atlantic & Pacific Corporation) of Panama City, Panama and renamed the SS Edgewater. In 1954 the ship was scrapped by the British Iron and Steel Corporation.

On the same day, December 20, 1941, at about the same time, 330 miles (530 km) to the north, off Cape Mendocino, the Japanese submarine I-17 was able to hit its target, SS Emidio. Five shells and one torpedo killed five crew members and wrecked the Emidio, which ran aground. I-17 was sunk on August 19, 1943 by HMNZS Tui and US Kingfisher floatplanes.

== See also ==
- SS Dorothy Phillips
- SS Barbara Olson
- California during World War II
