= SS Camden =

Coordinates: 46.7772°N 124.5208°W

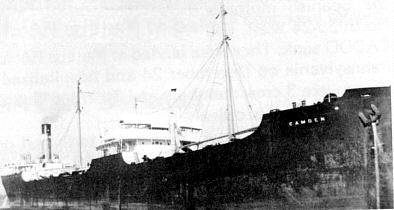
- SS Camden

History
- Name: SS Camden
- Owner: Charles Kurz & Co. Inc. and Pennsylvania Shipping Co. Mgrs
- Operator: Shell Oil Company Wilmington, DE
- Builder: New York Shipbuilding company, Camden, N.J.
- Yard number: 258
- Launched: 24 November 1920
- Completed: 1921
- Fate: Sunk by Japanese submarine I-25 in 1942

General characteristics
- Class & type: Petroleum tanker
- Tonnage: 6,653 tons
- Length: 127.9 m - 419.6 feet
- Beam: 17.2 m -56.4 feet
- Draught: 10.1 m - 33 feet
- Installed power: 601 nhp, 1 x 3-cyl. triple expansion steam engine, 1 screw 3 single boilers
- Propulsion: Oil fueled
- Speed: 11 knots
- Crew: 38/42

SS Camden was an American 6,653-ton tanker built by the New York Shipbuilding Company of Camden, New Jersey, for the Charles Kurz & Co. Inc. of Pennsylvania Shipping Company. She was operated by Shell Oil Company of Wilmington, Delaware. She was launched in 1921. The ship became famous when it was torpedoed early in World War II off the West Coast of the United States off Coos Bay, Oregon, at 43.38 N, –124.48 W at 7:00 am. She had departed San Pedro, Los Angeles, California, to Portland, Oregon, with fuel oil. The ship was attacked by Japanese submarine I-25 on October 4, 1942 off Oregon. She had been stopped for engine repairs at the time of the attack. She survived the attack, but later sank on October 10. One Crew member died and went down with the ship. The Camden was set on fire by the torpedo hit to her bow and was sinking. The crew abandoned ship and was rescued by a Swedish merchant ship, the MV Kookaburra. The Camden still on fire remained afloat. The tugboat Kenai was towing her to Astoria, Oregon, but then changed the path to Seattle, but the Camden sank off the coast of Washington state at 46.7772, -124.5208 and now rests at a depth of 312 feet.

== See also ==
- California during World War II
- Battle of Los Angeles
- American Theater (1939–1945)
- Military history of the United States during World War II
- United States home front during World War II
- Home front during World War II
