= SS Larry Doheny =

Ship that sunk in 1942

Coordinates: 41°17′24″N 125°21′00″W

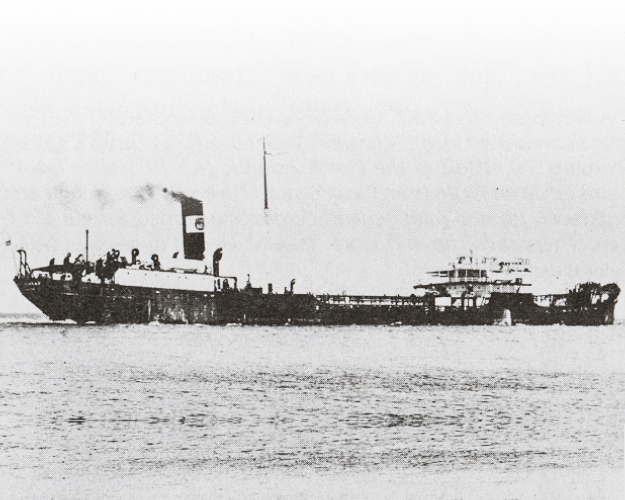
- SS Larry Doheny in 1941

History

Norway; United States
- Name: Foldenfjord (1921–1927); Larry Doheny (1927–1941)
- Namesake: Larry Doheny
- Owner: Den Norske Amerikalinje (1921–1927); Petroleum Securities Co. (1927–1928); Richfield Oil Company (1928–1941)
- Ordered: 2 May 1920
- Builder: Sun Shipbuilding & Drydock Co., Chester
- Yard number: 44
- Laid down: 17 January 1921
- Launched: 12 May 1921
- Sponsored by: Mrs. J.O. Bredal
- Homeport: Oslo (1921–1927); Los Angeles (1927–1941)
- Identification: US Official Number 226889; Call sign MGPT (1927–1933); Call sign WOBE (1934–1942)
- Fate: Sunk, 5 October 1942

General characteristics
- Type: Tanker
- Tonnage: 7,038 GRT; 4,348 NRT; 10,750 DWT
- Length: 430 ft 4 in (131.17 m)
- Beam: 59 ft 3 in (18.06 m)
- Depth: 33 ft 3 in (10.13 m)
- Installed power: 412 Nhp
- Propulsion: Sun Shipbuilding & Drydock Co. 3-cylinder triple expansion
- Speed: 10 1/2 knots (19.4 km/h; 12.1 mph)
- Armament: During WWII; 1 × 5-inch (127 mm)/38 caliber gun; 2 × 3-inch (76 mm)/50 caliber gun

Larry Doheny was a tanker ship that sank during World War II. The 430 ft x 59 ft x 33 ft oil tanker had nine cargo tanks and was built in 1921 by the Sun Shipbuilding & Dry Dock Company in Chester, Pennsylvania. The first owner of Larry Doheny was the Norwegian America Line and it was called SS Foldenfjord. In 1928, the ship was sold to the Richfield Oil Company, who owned many gas stations throughout the west coast of the U.S. Larry Doheny’s homeport was Los Angeles.

On October 5, 1942, The ship sank 8 miles off of Gold Beach, Oregon after an attack by the Japanese submarine I-25. Larry Doheny was on her way to Portland, Oregon from Long Beach, California and was loaded with 66,000 barrels of Bunker C Crude Oil. On October 4th, a radio warning of a submarine caused the ship to alter her course. A day later, at 21:21, a torpedo track was seen and soon after, a second miss was reported. At 22:07, the ship was struck by a torpedo from the forward direction at port side number 2. The crew reported hearing a loud thud and a crack as the vessel rose two feet in the air. The number 3 tank exploded which set the bridge afire and the port side buckled as a 14-foot hole opened six feet below the waterline. Larry Doheny was unable to counterattack as the ship was aflame, mechanisms were wrecked, and many personnel were trapped, but debris from the ship did hit the submarine. The steering mechanisms were destroyed, and the ship lost headway within two minutes. The explosion destroyed the radio, so no distress call was sent. Three men were known to be killed, and three believed dead. The surviving 40 crew members were rescued by USS Coos Bay, a United States Navy Barnegat-class small seaplane tender. The ship sank thirteen hours after the attack about 36 miles offshore of Cape Sebastian, although the precise location is still unknown.

== See also ==
- Attack on Pearl Harbor
- California during World War II
- SS Agwiworld
- SS Barbara Olson
- SS Montebello
