= SS Barbara Olson =

Cargo ship built in Wisconsin in 1918

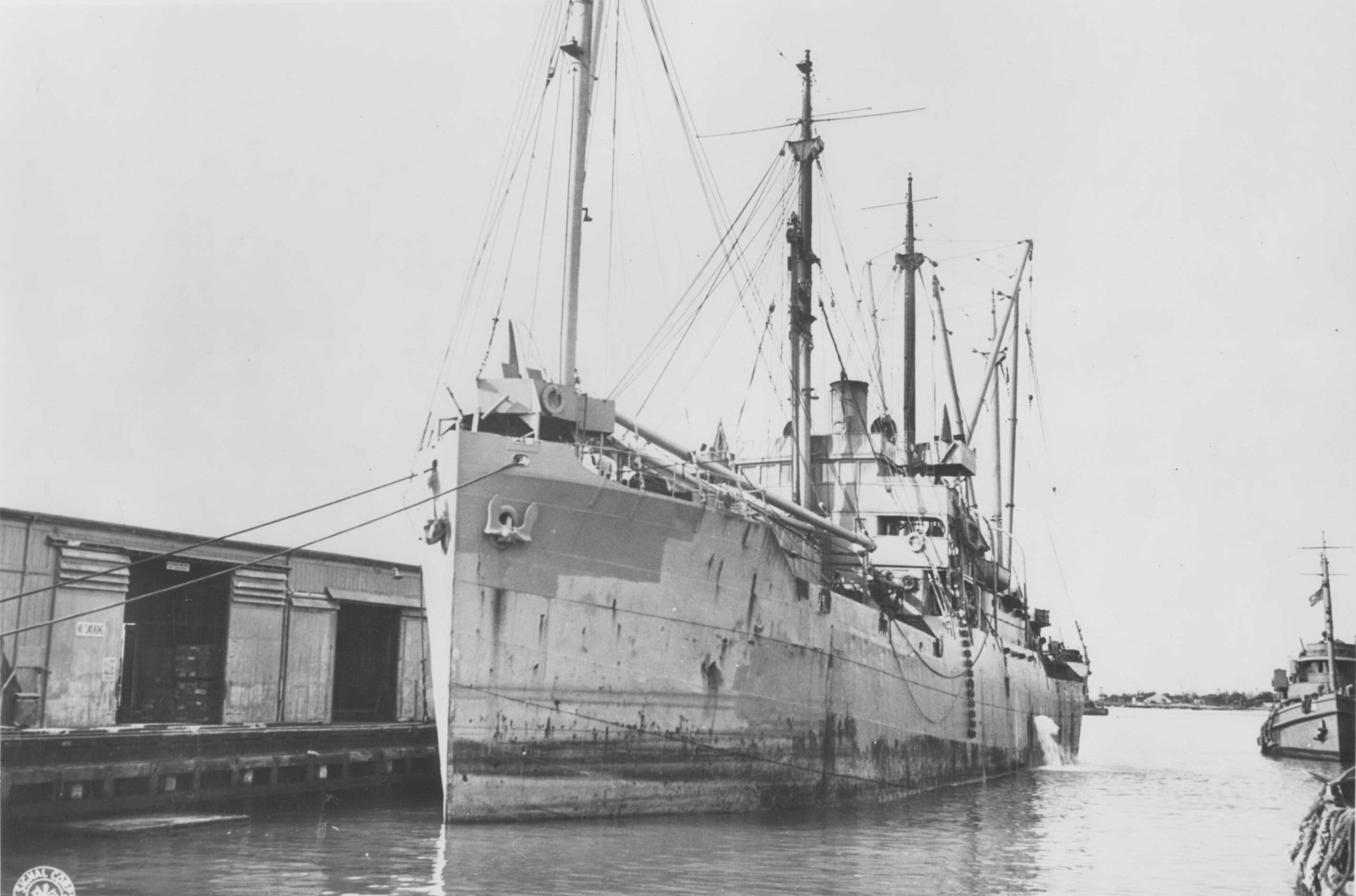
- USAT Barbara Olson

History
- Name: 1918–1940: Corrales; 1940–1941: Barbara Olson
- Operator: 1918–1940: United States Shipping Board; 1925–1934 Pillsbury-Curtis; 1934–1935 California Steamship Co.; 1935–1940 Matson Navigation Co; 1940–1941: Oliver J. Olson & Company, renamed SS Barbara Olson; 1942–1946 War Department; renamed USAT Barbara Olson; 1946–1957 Returned to Oliver J. Olson & Company.; 1957 Sold to Industrias Alimenticias Huacho S. A., El Callao; renamed SS Rio Pastaza; Flag: Peru
- Port of registry: (United States)
- Builder: Manitowoc Shipbuilding Company, Manitowoc, Wisconsin
- Yard number: Hull # 97
- Launched: 18 September 1918
- Completed: November 1918
- Identification: Official number: 217197; Signal letters: LQRK
- Fate: Stranded 4 mi (6.4 km) north of Pimentel, Peru, total loss.

General characteristics
- Type: Cargo ship
- Tonnage: 2,153 GRT (1919); 2,140 GRT (1920)
- Length: 250 ft 5 in (76.3 m) registered length
- Beam: 43 ft 7 in (13.3 m)
- Depth: 20 ft 1 in (6.1 m)
- Installed power: 1,250 ihp (930 kW)
- Propulsion: 1 triple expansion steam engine, 2 boilers, 1 screw
- Speed: 10 knots (19 km/h; 12 mph)
- Crew: 35

SS Barbara Olson was a cargo ship built in Wisconsin in 1918 as the SS Corrales. Barbara Olson was able to escape an attack off the coast of California in the early days of World War II. The Barbara Olson was built under a United States Shipping Board (USSB) contract in 1918 as the SS Corrales and renamed in 1940. On July 25, 1942, she was chartered by the US Army to transport supplies to the Territory of Hawaii as the USAT Barbara Olson for World War II. On January 14, 1946, her Army service ended. In 1964 she was run aground four miles (6.4 km) north of Pimentel, Peru and declared a total loss.

== Construction ==
SS Corrales was ordered by the United States Shipping Board during World War I. She was laid down in the late summer of 1918 and being built in prefabricated steel sections, was able to be launched in November 1918. The ship was one of nine Emergency Fleet Corporation Design 1044 hulls known as "Laker, Manitowoc Type" built by the Manitowoc Shipbuilding Company in Manitowoc, Wisconsin. The Corrales had the yard number 97 and was completed in November 1918, assigned official number 217197. Ship's characteristics were 2,153 GRT, changed in the 1920 register to 2,140 GRT, 250 ft 5 in (76.3 m) registered length, 43 ft 7 in (13.3 m) beam with a depth of 20 ft 1 in (6.1 m).

== Service ==
SS Corrales was purchased in 1925 by Pillsbury and Curtis for the West Coast lumber trade. In 1934 she was sold to the California Steamship Company. In 1935 sold to Matson Navigation Company. In 1940 sold to the Olson Brothers and renamed SS Barbara Olson.

After the Attack on Pearl Harbor on December 7, 1941, the United States entered World War II. The Imperial Japanese Navy sent submarines to attack ships off Coastal California. On December 24, 1941, at 6:25 am the Barbara Olson was steaming toward San Diego with a load of lumber. When at the entrance to the Port of Los Angeles, when the Japanese submarine I-19 fired a torpedo at the Barbara Olson. The torpedo passed under the ship, continued, and after passing the ship exploded 100 ft (30 m) from the ship. The explosion gave off smoke and flames, with torpedo fragments falling on the Barbara Olson's deck. The torpedo explosion was seen by the nearby United States Navy patrol boat subchaser USS Amethyst. I-19, far from home, was under orders to conserve torpedoes so only fired one at the Barbara Olson. I-19 was under the command of Lieutenant Commander Narahara Shogo at the time. USS Amethyst hunted for I-19, but was not able to find her.

Later that day I-19 torpedoed and hit the McCormick Steamship Company's 5,695-ton American lumber carrier, SS Absaroka off Point Fermin Light in San Pedro, Los Angeles. Absaroka was towed and beached at Fort MacArthur, preventing her from sinking. SS Emidio and SS Montebello were attacked and sank off the West Coast of the United States in the early days of the war.

On November 25, 1943 50 nautical miles (93 km) west of Makin Island the destroyer USS Radford found I-19 and sank her with depth charges, with all crew lost.

On July 25, 1942 Barbara Olson was chartered by the US Army to transport supplies to Hawaii and renamed the USAT Barbara Olson. On January 22, 1942, the cutter USCGC Taney was assigned to protect the USAT Barbara Olson. Both departed Honolulu and arrived at Kanton Island on January 28, 1942. Both crews helped to unload Barbara Olson's supplies. Taney continued to screen the Barbara Olson offshore until February 17, 942. Both ships went to Enderbury Island to evacuate the American colony. Both then went to Jarvis Island. Next, they went to Palmyra Atoll arriving on February 12, 1942, the ships remained there until 15 February 1942, before they headed back for the Hawaiian Islands, arriving at Honolulu on March 5, 1942.

On January 14, 1946, her Army service ended and she was returned to Oliver J. Olson & Company. In 1957 she was sold to Industrias Alimenticias Huacho S. A., El Callao; renamed SS Rio Pastaza of Peru. On October 8, 1964, the crew ran her aground, stranded her four miles (6.4 km) north of Pimentel, Peru to prevent her from sinking. She had started to leak and the crew was not able to stop the leak. She was declared a complete total loss.

== See also ==
- USS Stratford (AP-41) sister ship
- USS Gemini (AP-75) sister ship
- SS Cynthia Olson sister ship
- SS Dorothy Phillips
- California during World War II
