= SS Dorothy Phillips =

History

United States
- Name: Point Loma (1918–1937); Dorothy Phillips (1937–1946); Karen Olson (1946–1957); Rio Tigre (1957–1961)
- Namesake: Point Loma; Dorothy Phillips; Rio Tigre
- Owner: USSB (1918–1923)
- Builder: Albina Engine & Machine Works, Portland
- Yard number: 1
- Laid down: 18 April 1917
- Launched: 3 November 1917
- Christened: Margit
- Completed: 7 March 1918
- Identification: US Official Number 216021; Call sign LJSB
- Fate: Broken up, 1962

General characteristics
- Tonnage: 2,119 GRT; 1,289 NRT; 3,270 DWT
- Length: 251.0 ft (76.50 m)
- Beam: 43.5 ft (13.26 m)
- Depth: 18.1 ft (5.52 m)
- Installed power: 279 nhp, 1,200 ihp (890 kW)
- Propulsion: Albina Engine & Machine Works 3-cylinder triple expansion
- Speed: 9.5 knots (17.6 km/h; 10.9 mph)
- Armament: During WWII; 1 × 5-inch (127 mm)/38-caliber gun; 1 × 3-inch (76 mm)/50-caliber gun

SS Dorothy Phillips was a 2,119-ton cargo ship that was attacked during World War II. The Japanese submarine I-23 fired at her on December 24, 1941. Dorothy Phillips was damaged in the attack off the coast of Monterey, California. In the attack the ship's rudder was damaged and the ship could not steer and ran aground. Dorothy Phillips was built in 1918 by Albina Engine and Machine Works in Portland, Oregon. The attack helped put fear into the West Coast of the United States and started the Battle of Los Angeles. SS Emidio and SS Larry Doheny were also attacked and sank off the west coast.

Dorothy Phillips was built by Albina Engine & Machine Works in a shipyard along the Willamette River in Portland, Oregon, United States, for a Scandinavian shipping line and was requisitioned by the Emergency Fleet Corporation during World War I as Point Loma. In 1937, she was sold and renamed Dorothy Phillips. In 1946, she was sold and renamed Karen Olson. In 1957, she was sold and renamed Rio Tigre. In 1962, she was scrapped.

== See also ==
- Attack on Pearl Harbor
- List of shipwrecks in 1941
- California during World War II
- SS Barbara Olson
