= Japanese submarine I-19 =

1941 1st class submarine of the Imperial Japanese Navy

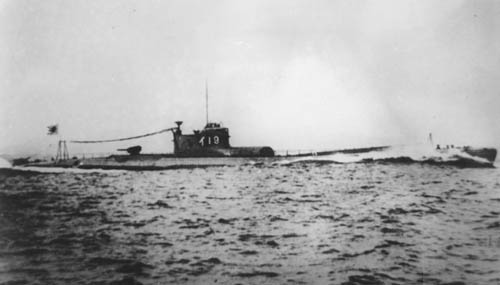
- I-19 in 1943

History

Japan
- Name: I-19
- Builder: Mitsubishi Heavy Industries, Kobe
- Laid down: 15 March 1938
- Launched: 16 September 1939
- Completed: 28 April 1941
- Stricken: 1 April 1944
- Fate: Depth charged and sunk 25 November 1943 by USS Radford.

General characteristics
- Class & type: Type B1 submarine
- Displacement: 2,584 tons surfaced; 3,654 tons submerged
- Length: 108.7 m (357 ft)
- Beam: 9.3 m (31 ft)
- Draught: 5.14 m (16.9 ft)
- Propulsion: 2 diesels: 12,400 hp (9,250 kW); Electric motors: 2,000 hp (1,500 kW)
- Speed: 23.5 knots (44 km/h) surfaced; 8 knots (15 km/h) submerged
- Range: 14,000 nautical miles (26,000 km) at 16 knots (30 km/h)
- Test depth: 100 m (330 ft)
- Complement: 94 officers and men
- Armament: 6 × 533 mm forward torpedo tubes; 17 torpedoes; 1 × 14 cm/40 11th Year Type naval gun
- Aircraft carried: 1 Yokosuka E14Y floatplane

Service record
- Part of: Submarine Division 1, Yokosuka Naval District; 15 November 1939 – 15 November 1940; Submarine Division 2, 6th Fleet; 15 November 1940 – 25 November 1943
- Commanders: Kaigun-chūsa Shogo Narahara; 28 April 1941 – 15 July 1942; Kaigun-chūsa Takakazu Kinashi; 15 July 1942 – 27 September 1943; Kaigun-shōsa Shigeo Kobayashi; 27 September – 25 November 1943
- Victories: 2 warships sunk (16,464 GRT); 1 warship damaged (37,484 GRT); 3 merchant ships sunk (21,533 GRT); 2 merchant ships damaged (12,876 GRT)

I-19 was a Japanese Type B1 submarine which damaged and destroyed several enemy ships during World War II while serving in the Imperial Japanese Navy. During the Guadalcanal Campaign, with a single torpedo salvo, the submarine sank the aircraft carrier USS Wasp and the destroyer USS O'Brien and damaged the battleship USS North Carolina.

== Service history ==
=== Attacks off California ===
I-19 attacked the SS H.M. Storey as she was bringing oil to Los Angeles on 22 December 1941, chasing the ship for an hour. Two miles off Point Arguello California, 55 miles north of Santa Barbara, the captain of I-19, Narahara, fired three torpedoes at H.M. Storey. All missed. A US Navy plane saw the sub and dropped depth charges. The sub was forced to dive and end the attack. Her single biggest success in this time period came when she torpedoed the cargo ship SS Absaroka, forcing the ship to beach herself (she was eventually repaired and put back into service).

=== Operation K ===
On 23 February 1942, I-19's Yokosuka E14Y (Glen) floatplane made a night reconnaissance over Pearl Harbor, Hawaii in preparation for Operation K, the second attack on Pearl Harbor by the Imperial Japanese Navy. On 4 March, she arrived at the French Frigate Shoals to serve as a radio beacon for the Kawanishi H8K (Emily) flying boats that were to attack Pearl Harbor. I-19 did not otherwise participate in the attack, which was carried out by two of the planned five H8Ks. No damages were inflicted by either H8K due to weather obscuring the target.

=== Aleutian Islands campaign ===
In early June 1942, I-19 took part in the opening stages of the Aleutian Islands campaign.

=== Sinking of USS Wasp and USS O'Brien ===
On 15 September 1942, while patrolling south of the Solomon Islands during the Guadalcanal Campaign under the command of Commander Takakazu Kinashi, I-19 sighted and attacked the U.S. carrier Wasp, firing a spread of six torpedoes. Three of the torpedoes hit the Wasp, causing heavy damage. With power knocked out, Wasp’s damage-control teams were unable to contain fires. She was abandoned and scuttled.

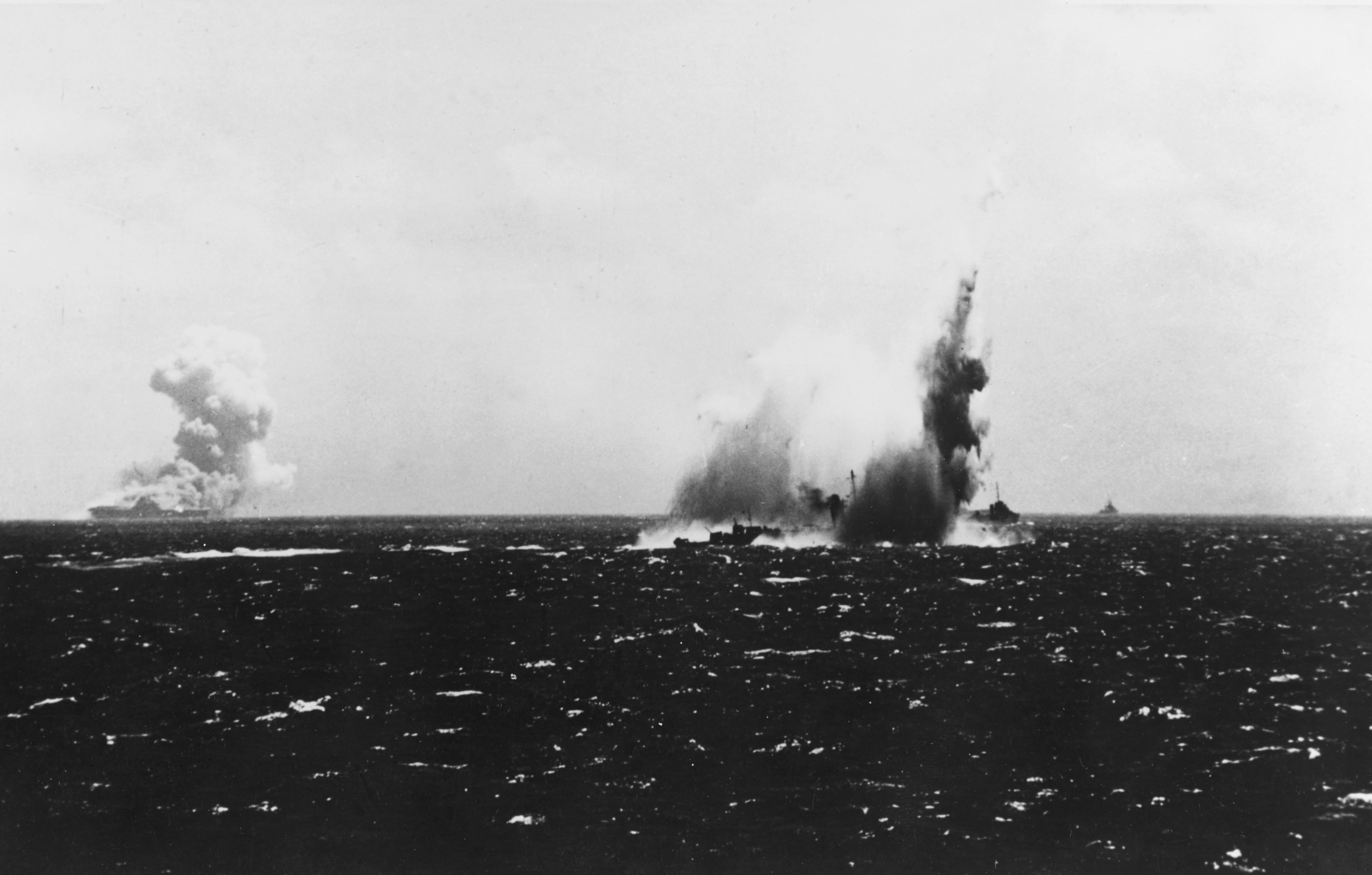
O'Brien hit by torpedo as USS Wasp burns. Both ships were torpedoed and sunk by I-19.

The remaining three torpedoes travelled for another 5 miles into the path of the Hornet task force. The spread hit the U.S. battleship North Carolina on its port side and the destroyer O'Brien, the latter of which later sank on 19 October 1942 en route for repairs. North Carolina sustained significant damage and underwent repairs at Pearl Harbor until 16 November 1942.

I-19's torpedo salvo sank an aircraft carrier and a destroyer and severely damaged a battleship, making it one of the most damaging torpedo salvos in history.

=== "Tokyo Express" ===
From November 1942 until February 1943, I-19 assisted with nocturnal supply and reinforcement deliveries and, later, evacuations for Japanese forces on Guadalcanal. Such missions by Japanese ships to Guadalcanal were called the "Tokyo Express" by Allied forces.

=== Fiji ===
Between April and September 1943, I-19 was stationed off Fiji and took part in several transport missions and war patrols. During this time, the submarine saw successes against multiple American cargo ships. On 30 April, I-19 torpedoed and sank the Liberty Ship SS Phoebe A Hearst, then damaged SS William Williams. I-19 then sank the SS William L Vanderbilt, before she crippled the SS M H DeYoung, which could not be repaired and was decommissioned.

=== Loss ===
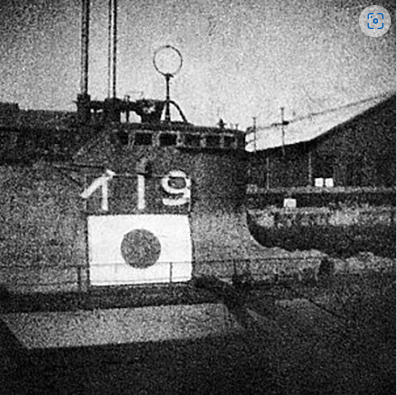
I-19 docked in harbor, showing her conning tower

On 25 November 1943, at 20:49, 50 nautical miles (93 km) west of Makin Island, destroyer USS Radford detected I-19 on the surface with radar. After I-19 submerged, Radford attacked with depth charges. I-19 was lost with all hands in this attack.

== History of Raiding Summary ==
Date	Ship Name	Classification	Nationality	Tonnage	Fate
24 December 1941	Absaroka	Cargo Ship	US	5,698	Damaged
15 September 1942	Wasp	Aircraft Carrier	US	19,423	Sunk
15 September 1942	O'Brien	Destroyer	US	2,246	Sunk
15 September 1942	North Carolina	Battleship	US	44,800	Damaged
30 April 1943	Phoebe A Hearst	Cargo Ship	US	7,176	Sunk
2 May 1943	William Williams	Cargo Ship	US	7,176	Damaged
16 May 1943	William L Vanderbilt	Cargo Ship	US	7,176	Sunk
13 August 1943	M H DeYoung	Cargo Ship	US	7,176	Destroyed
