= Bombardment of Ellwood =

1942 Japanese naval attack off the coast of Santa Barbara, California, USA

Coordinates: 34.426°N 119.908°W

- Part of World War II; Pacific War and American War
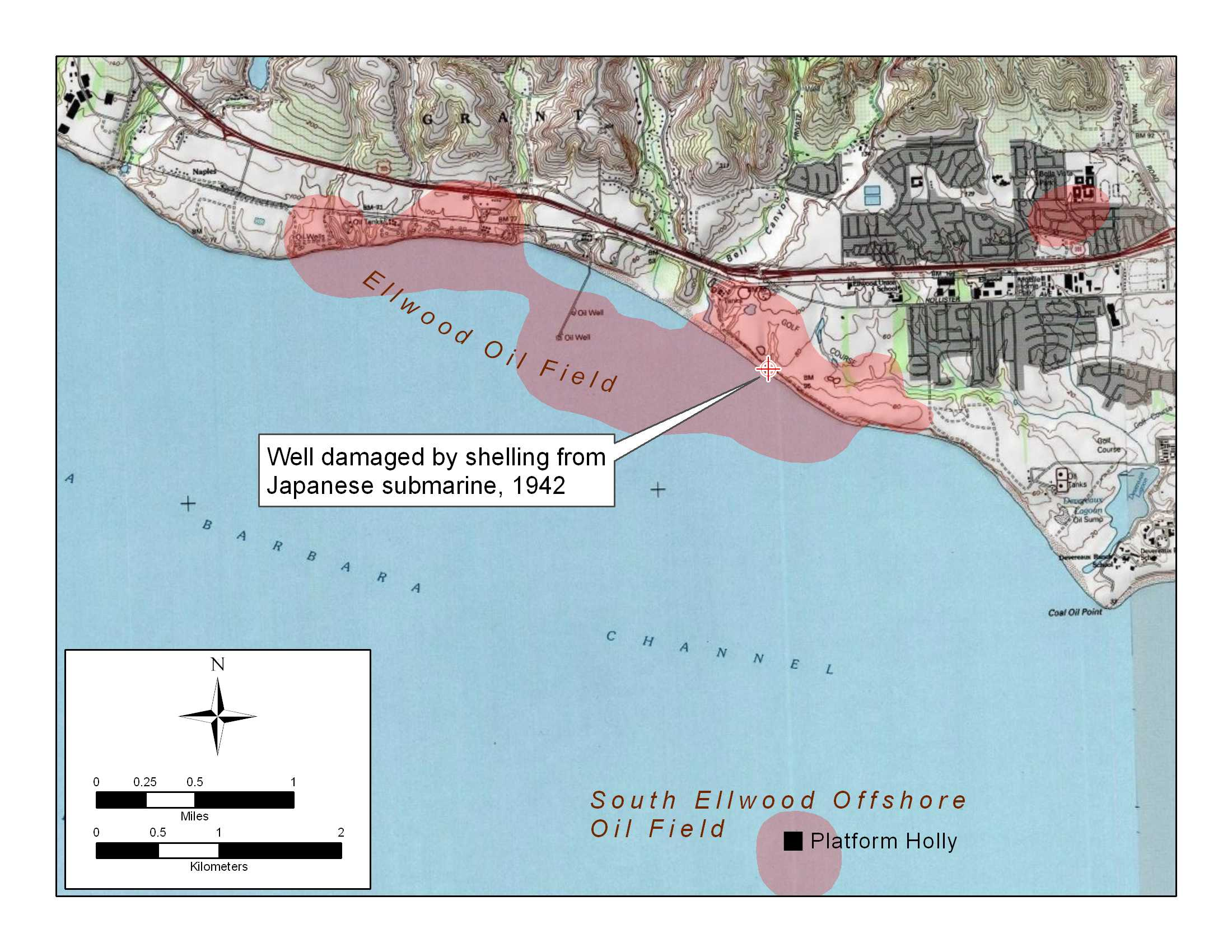
- The Ellwood Oil Field and the location of the Japanese attack.
Date	February 23, 1942
Location	Ellwood, California, Santa Barbara Channel, Pacific Ocean
Result	Japanese victory

Belligerents
United States	Japan

Commanders and leaders
N/A	Kozo Nishino

Strength
N/A	1 submarine

The Bombardment of Ellwood during World War II was a naval attack by a Japanese submarine against United States coastal targets near Santa Barbara, California in February 1942. Though the damage was minimal, the event was key in triggering the West Coast invasion scare and influenced the decision to intern Japanese-Americans. The event also marked the first shelling of the North American mainland during the conflict.

== Background ==
Following the surprise attack on Pearl Harbor in Hawaii, seven Japanese submarines patrolled the American West Coast. They sank two merchant ships and damaged six more, skirmishing twice with U.S. Navy air or sea forces. By the end of December, the submarines had all returned to friendly waters to resupply. However, several had gone to Kwajalein and would pay a return visit to American waters. One of these was the Imperial Japanese Navy submarine I-17. The I-17 displaced 3,654 long tons (3,713 t) when submerged and was 365 ft 6 in (111.40 m) long. Her armament included six 20 in (510 mm) torpedo tubes and 17 torpedoes, plus a 14-cm deck gun. She carried 101 officers and men, captained by Commander Kozo Nishino.

The Japanese government, concerned about President Roosevelt's radio speech scheduled for February 23, 1942, ordered a Japanese submarine to shell the California coast on that day. A popular story about the attack is that Nishino had been a naval reserve officer before the war and had commanded a pre-war merchant ship that sailed through the Santa Barbara Channel and had once stopped at the Ellwood Oil Field to take on a cargo of oil. However, after graduating from the Imperial Japanese Naval Academy in 1920, Nishino spent his entire career as a submarine crew member and officer and did not command a merchant ship, so the story of his prewar relationship to Santa Barbara is unlikely.

== Bombardment ==
At around 7:00 pm on February 23, 1942, the I-17 came to a stop opposite the Ellwood field on the Gaviota Coast. Nishino ordered the deck gun readied for action. Its crew took aim at a Richfield aviation fuel tank just beyond the beach and opened fire about 15 minutes later with the first rounds landing near a storage facility. The oil field's workmen had mostly left for the day, but a skeleton crew on duty heard the rounds hit. They took it to be an internal explosion until one man spotted the I-17 off the coast. An oiler named G. Brown later told reporters that the enemy submarine looked so big to him he thought it must be a cruiser or a destroyer until he realized that only one gun was firing.

Nishino soon ordered his men to aim at the second storage tank. Brown and the others called the police, as the Japanese shells continued to fall around them.

Firing in the dark from a submarine buffeted by waves, it was likely that rounds would miss their target. One round passed over Wheeler's Inn, whose owner Laurence Wheeler promptly called the Santa Barbara County Sheriff's Office. A deputy sheriff assured him that warplanes were already on their way, but none arrived. The Japanese shells destroyed a derrick and a pump house, while the Ellwood Pier and a catwalk suffered minor damage. After 20 minutes, the gunners ceased fire and the submarine sailed away. Estimates of the number of explosive shells fired ranged from 12 to 25. Although he caused only light damage, Nishino had achieved his purpose, which was to spread fear along the American west coast. A day later, reports of enemy aircraft led to the so-called “Battle of Los Angeles,” in which American artillery was discharged over Los Angeles for several hours due to the mistaken belief that the Japanese were invading.

Reverend Arthur Basham of Montecito called the police to claim he had seen the enemy submarine from his home. He said the I-17 turned south towards Los Angeles, apparently flashing signal lights to someone onshore. In reality, the I-17 had sailed west, safely returning to Japan.

== Aftermath ==
The attack was the first naval bombardment of the United States by a foreign power since the War of 1812 (Battle of Baltimore of 1814 by the British Royal Navy), excluding the incidental shelling of coastland Orleans, Massachusetts in 1918. Additionally, at about 5,100 miles east of Japan, the bombardment of Ellwood was the furthest direct attack on a land target that the Japanese Empire made during World War Two, several hundred miles further than the attacks on Sydney Harbor, Australia and Fort Stevens, Oregon in June 1942.

The reports of Nishino's attack caused hundreds to flee inland; many feared that the event was a prelude to a full-scale attack on the West Coast of the United States. Since several people in Santa Barbara claimed to have seen "signal lights", a blackout was ordered for the rest of the night. The claims of signals were used to justify Franklin D. Roosevelt's internment of Japanese Americans, which began just one week later.

One night after the Ellwood attack, the Battle of Los Angeles took place. In response to claimed sightings of "enemy aircraft", anti-aircraft batteries opened fire all across the city, causing panic among its residents.

Japanese submarines continued to conduct occasional attacks against allied shipping off the U.S. coast during the rest of the war. Sent to American waters in hopes of targeting warships, the submarines managed to sink only a handful of merchant ships, besides conducting a few minor attacks on shore targets. These consisted of a bombardment of Fort Stevens on the Columbia River, an attack on a Canadian lighthouse on Vancouver Island, and two air raids launched from a submarine in an attempt to start forest fires in southwest Oregon.

== See also ==
- Attacks on the United States
- Attack on Orleans
- California during World War II
- American Theater (World War II), detailing attacks and infiltrations on and near the Americas
- 1941, a 1979 film by Steven Spielberg, loosely based on the Bombardment of Ellwood
