= Japanese submarine I-17 =

1941 1st class submarine of the Imperial Japanese Navy

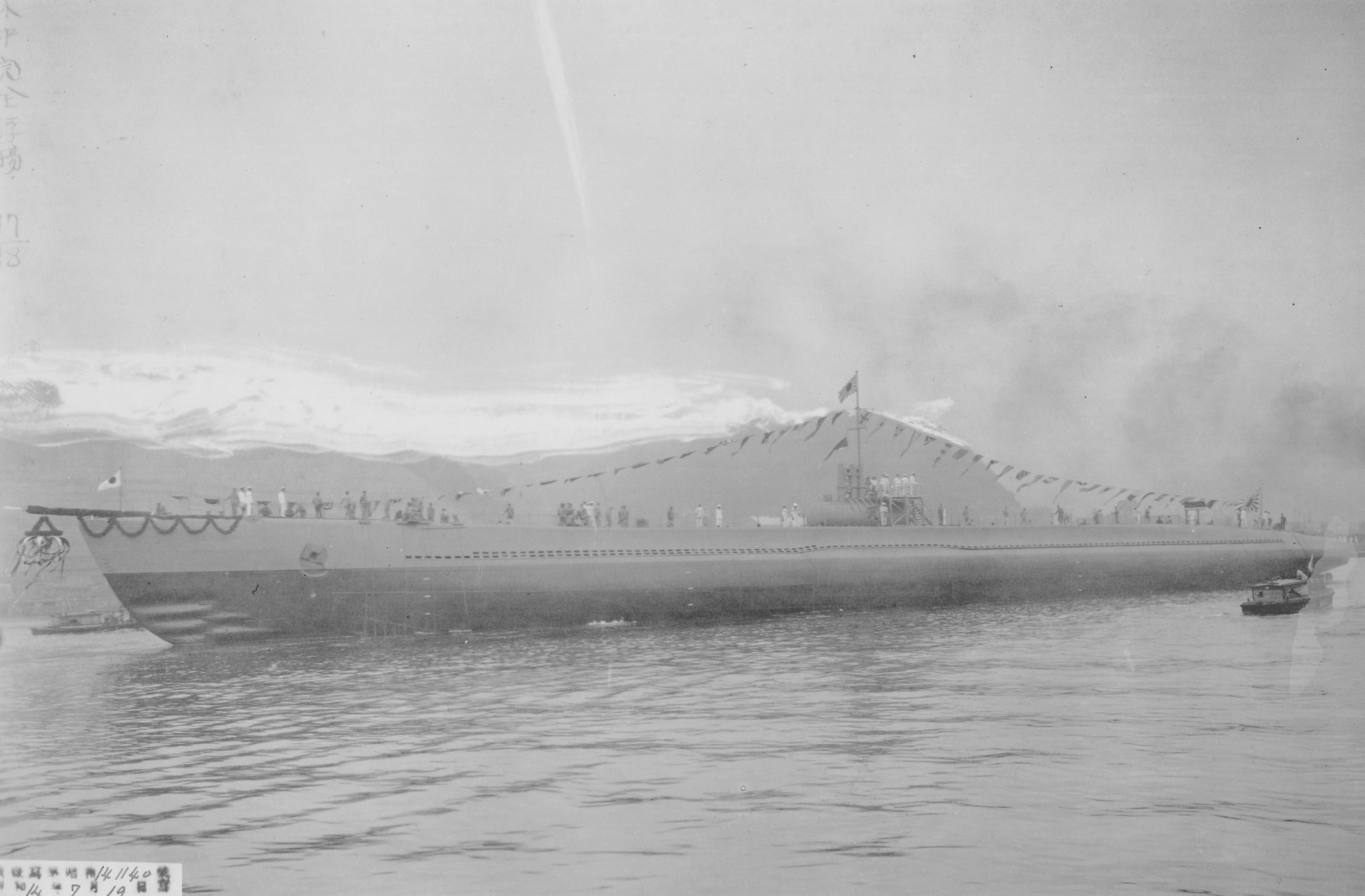
- I-17 shortly after launching, 19 July 1939

History

Empire of Japan
- Name: I-17
- Builder: Yokosuka Navy Yard
- Laid down: 18 April 1938
- Launched: 19 July 1939
- Commissioned: 24 January 1941
- Stricken: 1 December 1943
- Fate: Sunk on 19 August 1943 by HMNZS Tui (T234) and US Kingfisher float-planes

General characteristics
- Class & type: Type B1 submarine
- Displacement: 2,584 tons surfaced; 3,654 tons submerged
- Length: 108.7 m (356 ft 8 in)
- Beam: 9.3 m (30 ft 6 in)
- Draft: 5.14 m (16 ft 10 in)
- Propulsion: 2 diesels: 12,400 hp (9,250 kW); Electric motors: 2,000 hp (1,500 kW)
- Speed: 23.5 knots (43.5 km/h) surfaced; 8 knots (15 km/h) submerged
- Range: 14,000 nautical miles (25,928 km) at 16 knots (30 km/h)
- Test depth: 100 m (328.1 ft)
- Complement: 94 officers and men
- Armament: 6 × 533 mm forward torpedo tubes; 17 torpedoes; 1 × 14 cm/40 11th Year Type naval gun (removed November 1942)
- Aircraft carried: 1 Yokosuka E14Y seaplane

I-17 was a Japanese B1 type submarine of the Imperial Japanese Navy which saw service during World War II. This long-range submarine cruiser spent the early months of the war in the eastern Pacific and was the first Axis ship to shell the continental United States. She later supported the Imperial Japanese Army in fighting around the Solomon Islands and remained active in the southwest Pacific until she was sunk in August 1943.

== Service ==
=== Pearl Harbor ===
During the attack on Pearl Harbor on 7 December 1941, I-17 patrolled north of Oahu. Its mission was to reconnoiter and engage any ships that tried to sortie from Pearl Harbor. I-17 proceeded to a patrol station off Cape Mendocino following the attack on Pearl Harbor. The 6,912-ton General Petroleum tanker SS Emidio was sailing in ballast from Seattle, Washington en route to San Pedro, California. I-17 hit the tanker with five 14-centimeter (5.5 in) shells in the early afternoon of 20 December 1941. The tanker was within sight of land, and survivors reached the Blunt Reef lightship in lifeboats. The tanker drifted north onto rocks off Crescent City, California where the wreck remained until scrapped in 1959. A scheduled shelling of American coastal cities on Christmas Eve of 1941 was canceled because of the frequency of coastal air and surface patrols.

=== Shelling the U.S. continent ===
At night on 19 February 1942, I-17 covertly landed on Point Loma, San Diego to determine her position after arriving from Kwajalein Atoll. I-17 then headed north along the coast of California. On 23 February, I-17 achieved some notability as the first Axis ship to shell the United States mainland in an incident known as the Bombardment of Ellwood. A few minutes after 7 pm, she surfaced a few hundred yards off a beach 10 miles (16 km) west of Santa Barbara, California, within the Ellwood Oil Field. Over 20 minutes, she fired 17 shells from her 14 cm gun at the giant Richfield aviation fuel storage tanks on the blufftop behind the beach. The shots were mostly wild, one landing more than a mile inland. The closest shell exploded in a field 30 yards (27 m) from one of the tanks. The shelling did only minor damage to a pier and a pumphouse, but news of the shelling triggered an "invasion" scare along the West Coast.

The following night, the anti-aircraft defenses in Los Angeles exploded into action in response to an imagined invasion (later to be known as the Battle of Los Angeles. During a 30-minute fusillade, guns hurled 1,440 rounds of 3-inch (76 mm) and 37 mm ammunition into the night sky at a supposed enemy aircraft, and about ten tons of shrapnel and unexploded ammunition fell back on the city.

Date	Attack type/Location	Vessel/Weapon	Commander
23 Feb 1942	Oil Field, Goleta, California	I-17, 5.5-inch deck gun	Cdr Nishino
24 and 25 Feb 1942	Battle of Los Angeles, California	I-17 - This battle was the result of panic created by I-17's attack on 23 Feb 1942	Cdr Nishino

=== Aleutians and Guadalcanal ===
In early June 1942, I-17 took part in the opening stages of the Aleutian Islands campaign.

In November 1942, I-17's 14 cm deck gun was removed and she set out for Guadalcanal on the first of many supply missions.

=== Battle of the Bismarck Sea ===
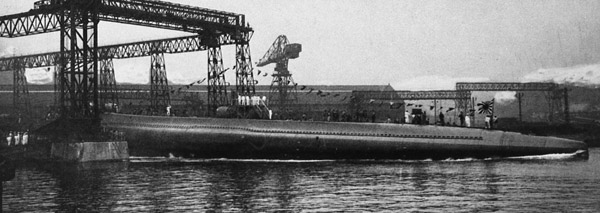
Launching of I-17, 17 July 1939

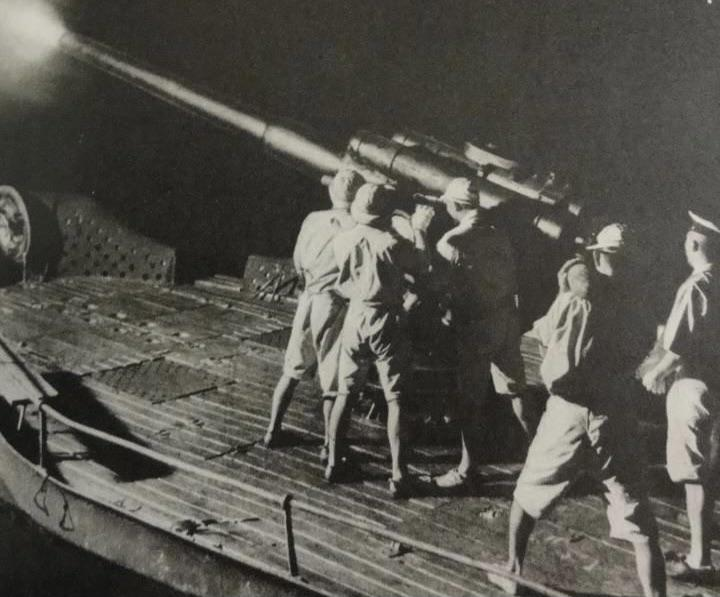
This photo is often credited as I-17 during the bombardment of Ellwood

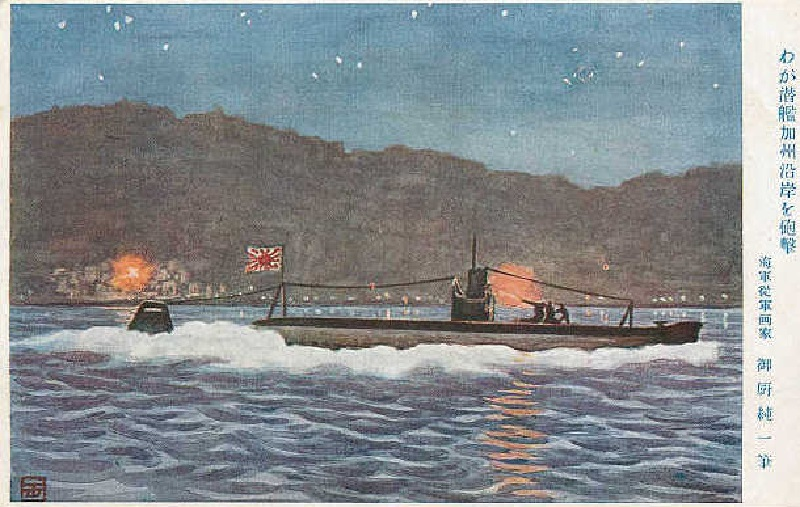
Artwork of I-17 bombarding Ellwood

On 2 March 1943 in the Battle of the Bismarck Sea, a Japanese convoy carrying troops to Lae was bombed and strafed by USAAF and Royal Australian Air Force planes for three successive days. All of the eight transports and cargo vessels in the convoy and four of the eight escorting destroyers were sunk. The Japanese in lifeboats, rafts and in the water were strafed by planes and PT boats. I-17 was directed to the area.

On 5 March two PT boats, PT-143 and PT-150, discovered I-17 with three lifeboats full of survivors from the Bismarck Sea battle. The submarine was taking them on board. I-17 crash dived as the PT boats strafed and fired torpedoes at her. The PT boats then sank the lifeboats with machine gun fire and depth charges. Several hours later, I-17 resurfaced and picked up 33 surviving soldiers.

The following day, I-17 rescued another 118 soldiers and four sailors. She then sailed to Lae and disembarked her 155 passengers.

=== Torpedoing Stanvac Manila ===
On 24 May 1943, 100 miles (160 km) south off Noumea 23°45′S 166°30′E. I-17 sighted the 10,169 ton Panamanian-flagged tanker Stanvac Manila. The tanker had six PT boats on board as cargo. At 0407, I-17's torpedo hit the tanker, flooding the engine and fire room and disabling all power and communications. At 12:05 Stanvac Manila sank, taking PT-165 and PT-173 with her. At about 13:00 the destroyer USS Preble arrived and towed three of the surviving PT boats, PT-167, PT-171 and PT-174 to Noumea. The remaining boat, PT-172, made Noumea under her own power. One life was lost.

=== Loss ===
On 19 August 1943, 40 miles (64 km) southwest off Noumea, I-17's "Glen" floatplane made a reconnaissance flight and spotted a convoy that had just cleared the harbour. After stowing the aircraft, I-17 set out after the convoy. The New Zealand armed trawler HMNZS Tui, escorting the convoy, picked up a submarine contact, she made an initial run without using depth charges, a second dropping two depth charges, and a third run with another two depth charges, then lost contact with I-17.

Kingfisher floatplanes of US Scouting Squadron VS-57, based in New Caledonia, joined the search. One of these indicated that Tui should investigate smoke on the horizon, I-17 was sighted on the surface and Tui opened fire at maximum range, scoring one, possibly two hits. I-17 was severely damaged and sank, leaving a trail of bubbles and oil.

Five minutes later, I-17 resurfaced with her bow exiting at a steep angle. The floatplane briefly strafed the submarine, before dropping more depth charges and I-17 sank at 23°26′S 166°50′E. I-17's with the loss of 91 of her crew. Tui rescued six survivors, who said Tui's depth charge attacks had damaged I-17, forced her to the surface and the Kingfisher's depth charges had sunk her.
