= SS Connecticut (1938) =

Tanker ship

Coordinates: 22°58′S 16°05′W

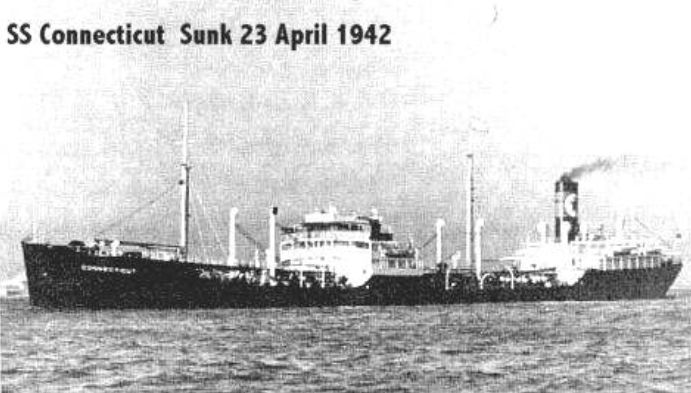
- SS Connecticut

History

United States
- Name: Connecticut
- Namesake: Connecticut
- Owner: Texaco
- Builder: Bethlehem Shipbuilding Corp. Ltd. - Bethlehem Steel
- Yard number: 4327
- Launched: 1 September 1938
- Identification: 237981 - WNZB
- Fate: Sank after surface raider attack, 22 April 1942

General characteristics
- Tonnage: 8,684 grt
- Length: 149.5 m
- Beam: 19.9 m
- Draught: 10.4 m
- Installed power: 880 n.h.p.
- Propulsion: 2 x Steam turbines DR geared to 1 screw shaft, one propeller
- Speed: 13 knots
- Complement: 53 Merchant and US Navy armed guard
- Armament: Deck guns

SS Connecticut was a 8684 ton tanker ship built in 1938 by Bethlehem Shipbuilding Corporation and used for a World War II. She operated her under the United States Merchant Marine act for the War Shipping Administration, with United States Navy Armed Guards to man her deck guns. On 28 December 1941, the Connecticut was torpedoed near Cape Disappointment in the Pacific Ocean by I-25 of the Imperial Japanese Navy. To stop from sinking the Connecticut ran aground and was later salvaged. The attack took place 10 nautical miles off the mouth of the Columbia River near Oregon. The Japanese attack on the Connecticut was under the command of Lieutenant Commander Akiji Tagami.

The Connecticut was later sunk on 22 April 1942 in the middle of the South Atlantic, while in route from Port Arthur, Texas, to Cape Town, South Africa. German light motor torpedo boat Esau (LS-4) from the auxiliary cruiser SS Michel torpedoed the Connecticut at 2:10am. The first torpedo started a fire to her cargo of 84,299 barrels of gasoline and heating oil. The radio operator was able send out a SOS call before the second torpedo hit and blew the ship apart. The attack killed 35 men and one more died aboard the Michel. All 11 of the Navy Armed Guards were killed. Only 18 sailors survived, they were turned over to Japan at Yokohama. Two prisoners of war died under the barbaric conditions as POWs of the Japanese. Connecticut rest at 22.58 S - 16.05 W. After the war the 16 surviving prisoners made it back home.

The merchant raider Michel was torpedoed and sunk by the US submarine USS Tarpon on 17 October 1943, near Tokyo Bay 290 men went down with the ship, other 116 reached Japan in lifeboats.

== See also ==
- California during World War II
- American Theater (1939–1945)
- United States home front during World War II
- Home front during World War II
