= SS Idaho =

Tanker owned by Texco

Coordinates: 35°35′N 121°16′W

SS Idaho was a 10,000-ton Texaco T2 type tanker ship, original named SS Dirigo built by the Texas Steamship Company of Bath, Maine, launched on 9 November 1918 and completed in February 1919. In 1940 she was renamed the SS Idaho. SS Idaho was attacked by the Japanese submarine I-21 off the coast of California on 23 December 1941. Sub I-21, captain Matsumura, surfaced and used his deck guns to attack the SS Idaho 18 miles off the coast of the small town of Cambria, California, but the 10,000-ton Texaco tanker escaped with minimal damage. A few hour earlier on 23 December, the submarine I-21 torpedoed the tanker SS Montebello, in the same spot off the coast of northern California, and then proceeded to machine-gun the survivors in the water. All of Montebello's 38 crew members survived the atrocity. After the war the Idaho was scrapped in 1947.

== Battle of Los Angeles ==
These and other attacks put fear into California coastal cites, they turned off lights or blacked out windows at night. Some sandbagged their homes and businesses. Some radio stations went off the air and civil ships were ordered to stay in port. Commercial air travel was grounded. A military defense system was installed up and down the coast, that included blimps, patrol ships, artillery batteries, and aircraft.

== See also ==
- California during World War II
- American Theater (1939–1945)
- United States home front during World War II
- Home front during World War II
