= 14 cm/40 11th Year Type naval gun =

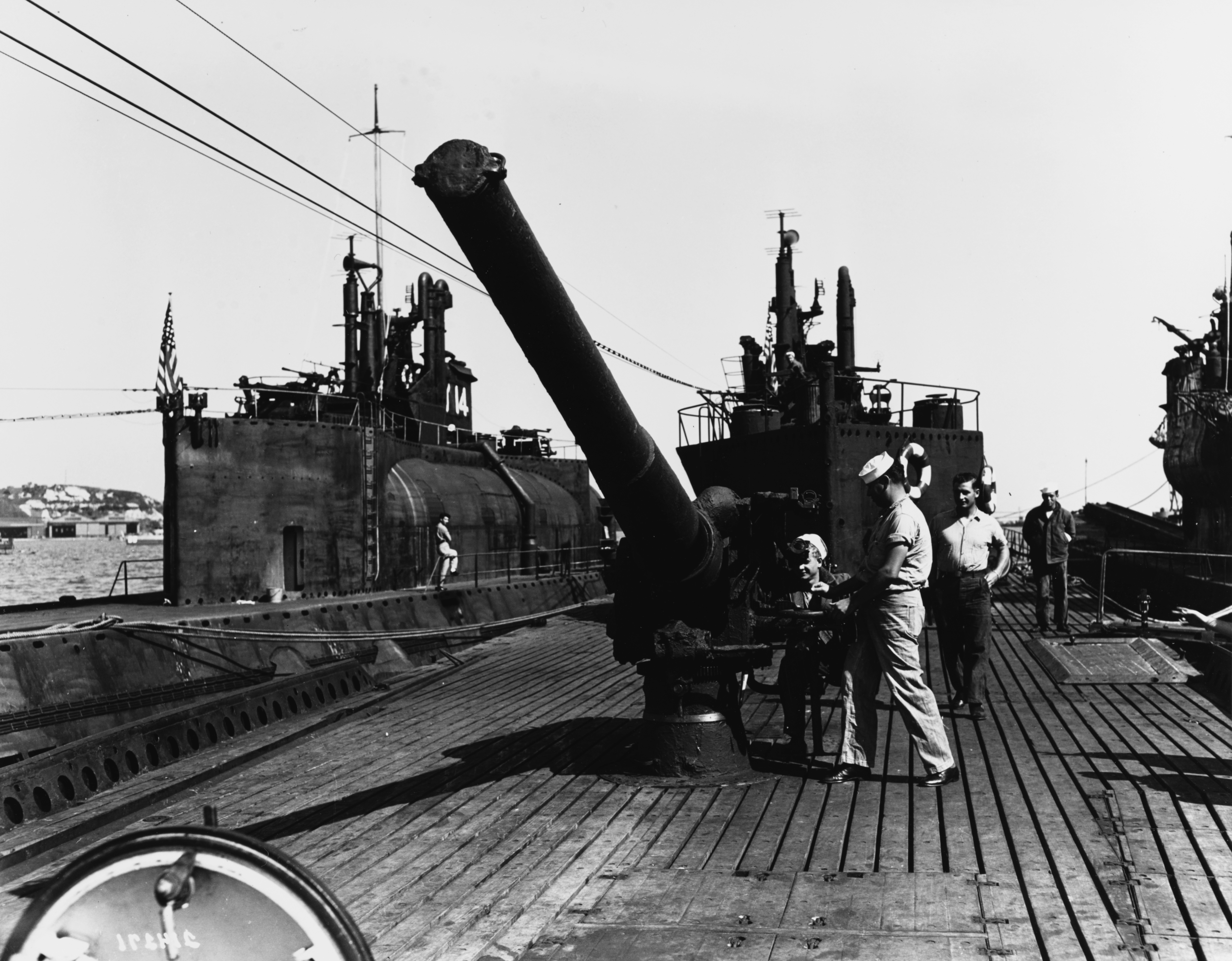
- 14 cm/40 11th Year Type naval gun aboard Japanese submarine I-400 being inspected by United States Navy personnel.
- Type: Naval gun
- Place of origin: Empire of Japan

Service history
- In service: 1922–1945
- Used by: Imperial Japanese Navy
- Wars: World War II

Specifications
- Mass: Single Mount: 8,600 kilograms (18,960 lb); Twin Mount: 18,300 kilograms (40,345 lb)
- Length: 5.9 meters (19 ft 4 in)
- Barrel length: 5.6 meters (18 ft 4 in) (bore length)
- Shell: separate-loading, cased charge
- Shell weight: 38 kilograms (84 lb)
- Caliber: 14-centimeter (5.5 in)
- Breech: Horizontal sliding breech block
- Elevation: Single Mount: +30° to −5° Twin Mount: +40° to −7°
- Rate of fire: 5 rounds per minute
- Muzzle velocity: 700 meters per second (2,300 ft/s)
- Maximum firing range: 16,000 meters (17,000 yd) at +30°

The 14 cm/40 11th Year Type naval gun was the standard surface battery for Japanese submarine cruisers of World War II. Most carried single guns, but Junsen type submarines carried two. Japanese submarines I-7 and I-8 carried an unusual twin mounting capable of elevating to 40°. The appended designation 11th year type refers to the horizontal sliding breech block on these guns. Breech block design began in 1922, or the eleventh year of the Taishō period in the Japanese calendar. The gun fired a projectile 14 centimeters (5.5 in) in diameter, and the barrel was 40 calibers long (barrel length is 14 cm x 40 = 560 centimeters or 220 inches).

== World War II ==
This gun was the weapon used by Japanese submarine I-26, along with torpedoes, to sink SS Cynthia Olson, on December 7 1941, the first United States Merchant Marine vessel to be sunk after the entry of the United States into World War II. The type was used by I-17 to sink SS Emidio on December 18, 1941, and to bombard the Ellwood Oil Field near Santa Barbara, California on February 23, 1942. It was also used by I-25 for the Bombardment of Fort Stevens in Oregon near the mouth of the Columbia River on June 21, 1942, and by I-26 to shell the Estevan Point lighthouse in British Columbia.

On June 8, 1942, on the coast of New South Wales, Australia, the type was used by I-21 to shell Newcastle and by I-24 to bombard Sydney Harbour.

== Similar weapon ==
A longer-barreled 14 cm/50 3rd Year Type naval gun was used aboard surface ships and for coastal defense. The 40 caliber/11th Year Type guns were intended for use against destroyers, and fired base-fuzed projectiles with thinner shell walls allowing a larger bursting charge than the 50 caliber/3rd Year Type guns for potential use against armored ships. The lower velocity 40 caliber gun had a useful life expectancy of 800 to 1000 effective full charges (EFC) per barrel.
