= SS H.M. Storey =

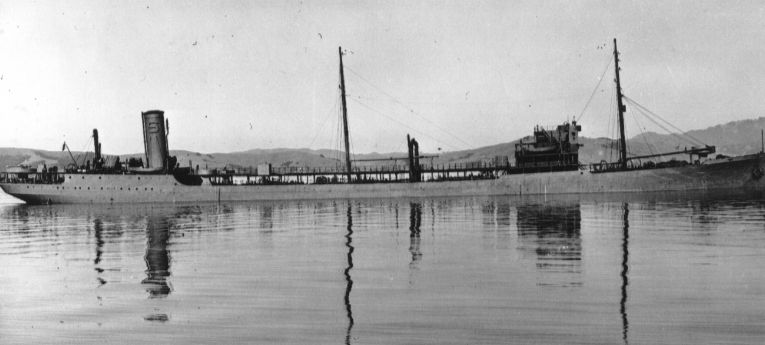
- Oil tanker SS W.S. Rheem, sister ship to SS H.M. Storey and SS F.H. Hillman

History

United States
- Name: H.M. Storey
- Namesake: Henry M. Storey
- Owner: Standard Oil of California
- Builder: Bethlehem Shipbuilding Co., Alameda
- Yard number: 5312
- Laid down: 19 January 1921
- Launched: 28 September 1921
- Fate: Sunk by I-25, 17 May 1943

General characteristics
- Type: Tanker
- Tonnage: 9,838 GRT; 6,007 NRT; 10,763 DWT
- Displacement: 16,000 long tons (16,257 t)
- Length: 500 ft 0 in (152.40 m) o/a
- Beam: 68 ft 3 in (20.80 m)
- Draft: 30 ft 0 in (9.14 m)
- Installed power: 2,700 hp (2,000 kW)
- Propulsion: triple-expansion engine with dual shaft and 2 screws.
- Speed: 10.5 knots (19.4 km/h; 12.1 mph)
- Crew: 47 sailors, 15 armed guards
- Armament: During World War II; 1 × 4-inch deck gun; 9 × Oerlikon 20 mm cannons

H.M. Storey was an oil tanker built in 1921. She escaped an attack in California in 1941, but was sunk in an attack in 1943. She was owned by Standard Oil Company of California and built by Bethlehem Shipbuilding Corporation at the Alameda Works Shipyard with a hull# of 5312. She had a max capacity of 306,115 US gallons (1,158,770 L; 254,894 imp gal) of fuel oil. Her keel was laid on 19 January 1921 and she was launched on 28 September 1921. Her sister ships are the SS F.H. Hillman and SS W.S. Rheem. She had a range of 7,717 miles, 10,763 DWT and a 16,000-ton displacement. She had a length of 500 feet (150 m), a beam of 68.2 feet (20.8 m) and a draft of 30 feet (9.1 m). The engines created 2,700 horsepower (2,000 kW), made by a triple-expansion engine (twin 3-cylinder reciprocating steam engine) with dual shaft and two screws. She had three Scotch boilers. Named for Henry Martin Storey, vice president of the Standard Oil Company.

A Standard Oil Company first, the H.M. Storey was the first ship to bring oil from Estero, Florida to California in 1930.

== World War II ==
The SS H.M. Storey was appropriated by the War Shipping Administration for World War II and operated with Merchant Marine and United States Navy Armed Guards to man the deck guns. H.M. Storey was bringing oil to Los Angeles when on 22 December 1941 the Imperial Japanese Navy's submarine I-19 chased the ship for an hour. Then two miles (3.2 km) off Point Arguello California, 55 miles (89 km) north of Santa Barbara, the captain of I-19, Narahara, fired three torpedoes at H.M. Storey, all missed. A US Navy plane saw the sub and dropped depth charges, the sub was forced to dive and end the attack.

H.M. Storey was bringing oil from Noumea, New Caledonia in the South Pacific Ocean to Los Angeles, when on 17 May 1943, when the Japanese submarine I-25 fired shells at the ship and launched torpedoes, killing two of the crew. The surviving 63 crew members (including all 15 armed guards) made it in to the ship's lifeboats before she sank. The US destroyer USS Fletcher rescued the crew in the lifeboats and took them to Port Vila Efate, Vanuatu in the South Pacific.

On 3 September 1943, I-25 was sunk by US destroyers: USS Ellet, USS Patterson and others off the New Hebrides islands approximately 150 miles (240 km) northeast of Espiritu Santo. I-19 was sunk by depth charges from USS Radford on 25 November 1943 50 nautical miles (93 km) west of Makin Island.

== Sister ships ==
=== SS F.H. Hillman ===
SS F.H. Hillman was an oil tanker ship built in 1921 with the same specifications as the H.M. Storey. She was owned by Standard Oil Company of California and built by Bethlehem Shipbuilding Corporation at the Alameda Works Shipyard. She was launched on 12 Oct 1921. She was named after F. H. Hillman, Director of Producing for Standard Oil Company. At completion she was the largest steel tank ship on the Pacific west coast and the largest owned by Standard Oil. Ship Number 221884221884.

=== SS W.S. Rheem ===
SS W.S. Rheem was an oil tanker ship built in 1921 with the same specifications as the H.M. Storey. She was owned by Standard Oil Company of California and built by Bethlehem Shipbuilding Corporation at the Alameda Works Shipyard with a hul# 5313. Her radio call sign was WGAO. Her keel was laid on 1 March 1921 and she was launched on 10 Nov. 1921. She was named after William Rheem, president of the Standard Oil Company of California (today's Chevron Corporation) from 1917 until his death on 19 April 1919. W.S. Rheem was the first tanker to take crude oil from Bahrain to Japan in 1934.

On 31 August 1943 the W.S. Rheem. was torpedoed by the I-20. The W.S. Rheem was attacked 10 miles (16 km) north of Bougainville Strait, near Espiritu Santo, at 15.51 S 167.02 E, no one was killed in the attack. At the time the ship had a crew of 40 sailors and 25 armed guards. The crew began to abandon ship but Master Gustaf Johnson saw that the forward bulkheads remained functional. By moving the cargo from the forward tanks to the stern tanks, the ship was able to move without sinking, so she delivered her oil cargo. W.S. Rheem made it to Espiritu Santo for temporary repairs to the large 20-by-25-foot (6.1 by 7.6 m) hole in the port side of the dry cargo hold forward, by the crew of USS Vestal. USS Wadsworth a Fletcher-class destroyer was sent out to hunt down I-20. On 1 September 1943 Wadsworth found the sub and dropped seven patterns of depth charges. I-20 was not heard from or seen again. W.S. Rheem. was renamed twice: SS Shreveport and later SS Cities Services Koolmotor

== See also ==
- List of ships built in Alameda, California
- List of shipwrecks in May 1943
