= Japanese submarine I-25 =

Imperial Japanese Navy B1 type submarine

- I-25 preparing to launch her E14Y floatplane, piloted by Nobuo Fujita, in 1942

History

Japan
- Name: I-25
- Builder: Mitsubishi
- Laid down: 3 February 1939
- Launched: 8 June 1940
- Commissioned: 15 October 1941
- Fate: Sunk by the destroyer USS Patterson on 25 August 1943

Service record
- Part of: Yokosuka Naval District; Submarine Squadron 1
- Commanders: Meiji Tagami; 15 October 1941 – 7 July 1943; Tsuneo Shichiji; 7 July 1943 – 15 July 1943; Masaru Ohiga; 15 July 1943 – 3 September 1943

General characteristics
- Class & type: B1 Type submarine
- Displacement: 2,344 tonnes (2,584 tons) surfaced; 3,315 tonnes (3,654 tons) submerged
- Length: 108.7 m (356.6 ft)
- Beam: 9.3 m (30.5 ft)
- Draught: 5.1 m (16.7 ft)
- Propulsion: 2 diesels: 9,246 kW (12,400 hp); Electric motors: 1,491 kW (2,000 hp)
- Speed: 43.5 km/h (23.5 kn; 27.0 mph) surfaced; 15 km/h (8 kn; 9 mph) submerged
- Range: 25,928 km (14,000 nmi; 16,111 mi) at 30 km/h (16.2 kn; 18.6 mph)
- Test depth: 100 m (330 ft)
- Complement: 94 officers and men
- Armament: 6 × 533 mm (21 in) forward torpedo tubes; 17 torpedoes; 1 × 14 cm/40 11th Year Type naval gun
- Aircraft carried: 1 × Yokosuka E14Y observation seaplane

I-25 (イ-25) was a B1 type (I-15-class) submarine of the Imperial Japanese Navy that served in World War II, took part in the Attack on Pearl Harbor, and was the only Axis submarine to carry out aerial bombing on the continental United States in World War II, during the so-called Lookout Air Raids, and the shelling of Fort Stevens, both attacks occurring in the state of Oregon.

I-25, displaced 2584 long tons surfaced and 3654 long tons submerged and was 108 m (354 ft 4 in) long, with a range of 25,928 km (14,000 nmi; 16,111 mi), a maximum surface speed of 43.5 km/h (23.5 kn; 27.0 mph) and a maximum submerged speed of 15 km/h (8 kn; 9 mph). She carried a two-seater Yokosuka E14Y reconnaissance floatplane, known to the Allies as "Glen". It was disassembled and stowed in a hangar in front of the conning tower.

== First patrol ==
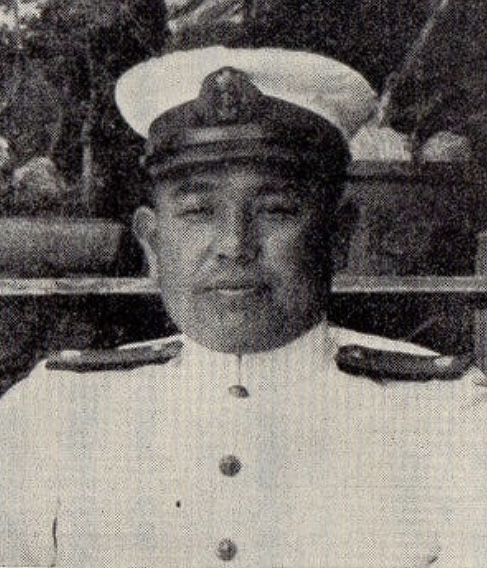
Lt. Cmdr. Meiji (Akiji) Tagami

In World War II, I-25 served under the command of Lieutenant Commander Akiji Tagami who had graduated from Class 51 at Etajima, Hiroshima. 26-year-old Lieutenant Tatsuo Tsukudo was the executive officer(XO) on I-25. I-25 departed Yokosuka on 21 November 1941 in preparation for hostilities.

I-25 and three other submarines patrolled a line 222 km (120 nmi; 138 mi) north of Oahu during the Japanese Attack on Pearl Harbor. After the Japanese aircraft carriers sailed west following the attack, I-25 and eight other submarines sailed eastwards to patrol the west coast of the United States. I-25 patrolled off the mouth of the Columbia River. A scheduled shelling of American coastal cities on Christmas eve of 1941 was canceled because of the frequency of coastal air and surface patrols.

I-25 attacked SS Connecticut 16 km (9 nmi; 10 mi) off the US coast. The damaged tanker managed to escape but ran aground at the mouth of the Columbia River. I-25 then returned to Kwajalein, arriving on 11 January 1942 to refuel and be refurbished.

== Second patrol ==
I-25 left Kwajalein atoll in the Marshall Islands on 5 February 1942 for its next operational patrol in the south Pacific. Tagami's orders were to reconnoiter the Australian harbours of Sydney, Melbourne and Hobart followed by the New Zealand harbours of Wellington and Auckland.

I-25 travelled on the surface for nine days, but as she approached the Australian coastline, she only travelled on the surface under the cover of night.

On Saturday 14 February 1942, I-25 was within a few miles of the coast near Sydney. The searchlights in Sydney could clearly be seen from the bridge of I-25. Tagami then took I-25 to a position 190 km (100 nmi; 120 mi) south east of Sydney.

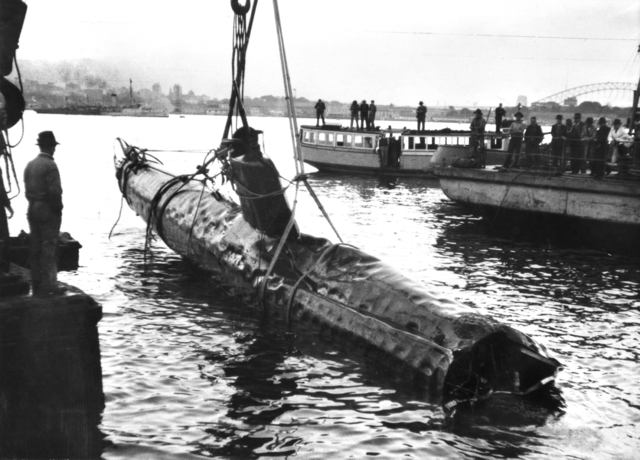
A Japanese Ko-hyoteki-class midget submarine, believed to be Midget No. 14, is raised from Sydney Harbour on 1 June 1942.

A number of days of rough swell prevented an immediate launch of the "Glen" floatplane. They stayed submerged during the day and went back to the surface at night. Finally on Tuesday, 17 February 1942, Warrant Flying Officer Nobuo Fujita took off in the "Glen" for a reconnaissance flight over Sydney Harbour. The purpose was to look at Sydney's airbase. By 0730, Fujita had returned to I-25 and disassembled the "Glen" and stowed it in the watertight hangar. Commander Tagami then pointed I-25 southwards on the surface at 26 km/h (14 kn; 16 mph). By midday on Wednesday 18 February, they were nearly 740 km (400 nmi; 460 mi) south east of Sydney still heading southwards.

Their next mission was a similar flight over Melbourne. Tagami decided to launch the aircraft from Cape Wickham at the northern end of King Island at the western end of Bass Strait about halfway between Victoria and Tasmania. The floatplane was launched on 26 February 1942 for its reconnaissance flight to Melbourne over Port Phillip Bay.

Fujita's next reconnaissance flight in Australia was over Hobart on 1 March 1942. I-25 then headed for New Zealand where Fujita flew another reconnaissance flight over Wellington on 8 March. Fujita next flew over Auckland on 13 March, followed by Fiji on 17 March.

I-25 returned to its base at Kwajalein on 31 March 1942 and then proceeded to Yokosuka for refit. I-25 was in Yokosuka drydock number 5 on 18 April 1942 when one of the Doolittle Raid B-25 Mitchell bombers damaged Japanese aircraft carrier Ryūhō in adjacent drydock number 4.

== Third patrol ==
While outbound past the Aleutian Islands for a third war patrol off the west coast of North America, I-25's Glen seaplane overflew United States military installations on Kodiak Island. The surveillance on 21 May 1942 was in preparation for the northern diversion of the Battle of Midway.

Shortly after midnight on 20 June 1942, I-25 torpedoed the new, coal-burning Canadian freighter SS Fort Camosun off the coast of Washington. The freighter was bound for England with a cargo of war production materials including zinc, lead, and plywood. One torpedo struck the port side below the bridge and flooded the 2nd and 3rd cargo holds. Canadian corvettes Quesnel and Edmundston reached the stricken freighter after dawn and rescued the crew from lifeboats. Fort Camosun was towed back into Puget Sound for repairs, and later survived a second torpedo attack by I-27 in the Gulf of Aden in the fall of 1943.

On the evening of 21 June 1942, I-25 followed a fleet of fishing vessels to avoid minefields near the mouth of the Columbia River, in Oregon. I-25 fired seventeen 14-cm (5.5-inch) shells at Battery Russell, a small coastal army installation within Fort Stevens which was later decommissioned. Fort Stevens was equipped with two 10-inch disappearing guns, some 12-inch mortars, 75 mm field guns, .50-caliber machine guns, and associated searchlights, observation posts, and secret radar capability. Damage was minimal. In fact, the only items of significance damaged on the fort were a baseball backstop and some power and telephone lines.

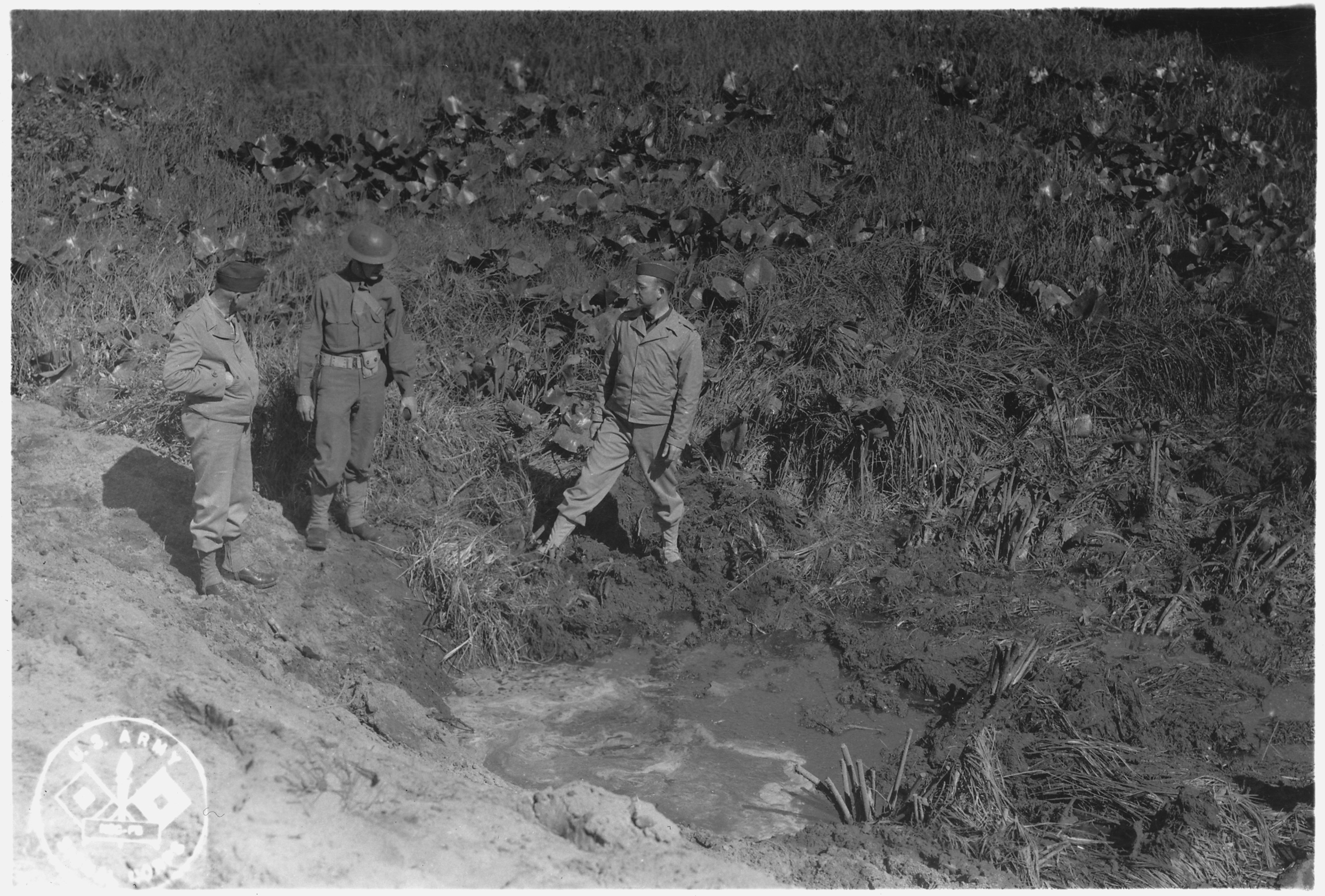
American servicemen inspecting a shell crater after the I-25's attack on Fort Stevens

The incoming shell fire had a highly stimulative effect on the personnel at Battery Russell. Men jumped out of bed, crashing into things in the dark as they moved to their battle stations in their underwear. There was no time to turn on a light.

"We looked like hell," Capt. Jack R. Wood, commander of the battery, told historian Bert Webber later. "But we were ready to shoot back in a couple of minutes."

But when gunners requested permission to open fire, they were firmly refused. In part, this was because the submarine's location remained uncertain because of difficulties evaluating reports from different observation points; it was, after all, 10 miles (16 km) from shore. Furthermore, authorities later stated they wished to avoid revealing the locations of their guns to what they believed to be a reconnaissance mission. The sub may also have been out of range of Battery Russell's artillery; the mechanism used with the 10-inch disappearing guns limited their upward travel, which limited their effective range to less than 10 miles (16 km). If the guns opened fire, the sub would be able to report back to Tokyo that a fleet of surface ships could simply heave to 10 miles (16 km) from shore, pound Battery Russell with impunity, then sail right on into the Columbia — where, among other valuable targets upstream at Portland, the Oregon Shipbuilding Corporation, one of Henry Kaiser's shipyards, was producing Liberty ships at a rate of more than one a week.

In the end, Battery Russell absorbed the fire without a single shot in reply. It was a turning point for American coastal artillery, and the failure to respond caused re-evaluation of men and artillery allocated to coastal defense.

== Fourth patrol ==
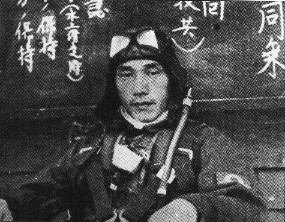
Warrant Flying Officer Nobuo Fujita.

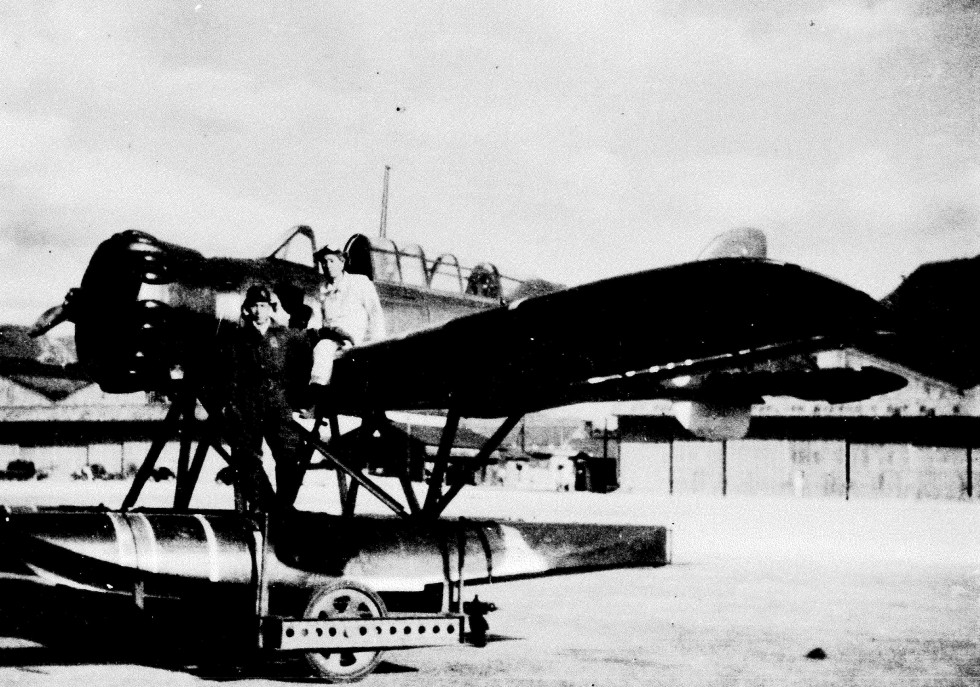
Nobuo Fujita standing by his Yokosuka E14Y "Glen" seaplane.

Following his successful observation flights on the second and third patrols, Warrant Officer Nubuo Fujita was specifically chosen for a special incendiary bombing mission to create forest fires in North America. I-25 left Yokosuka on 15 August 1942 carrying six 76-kilogram (168 lb) incendiary bombs. On 9 September, the crew again deployed the "Glen", which dropped two bombs over forest land near Brookings, Oregon. This attack by an enemy airplane was later called the "Lookout Air Raids", and was the only time that the mainland United States was ever bombed by enemy aircraft and the second continental territory to be bombed as such during wartime, after the bombing of Dutch Harbor in Unalaska, Alaska.

Warrant Officer Fujita's mission had been to trigger wildfires across the coast; at the time, the Tillamook Burn incidents of 1933 and 1939 were well known, as was the destruction of the city of Bandon, Oregon by a smaller out-of-control wildfire in 1936. But light winds, wet weather conditions and two quick-acting fire lookouts kept the fires under control. In fact, had the winds been sufficiently brisk to stoke widespread forest fires, the lightweight Glen may have had difficulty navigating through the bad weather. Shortly after the Glen seaplane had landed and been disassembled for storage, I-25 was bombed at 42°22′N 125°12′W by a United States Army A-29 Hudson piloted by Captain Jean H. Daugherty from McChord Field near Tacoma, Washington. The Hudson carried 300-pound (140 kg) general-purpose demolition bombs with delayed fuzes rather than depth charges. The bombs caused minor damage, but quick response by a Coast Guard cutter and three more aircraft caused I-25 to be more cautious on a second bombing raid on 29 September 1942. The Glen seaplane was assembled and launched in pre-dawn darkness using Cape Blanco Light as a reference. The plane was heard at 0522 by a work crew at the Grassy Knob Lookout 7 miles (11 km) east of Port Orford, Oregon; but fire crews from the Gold Beach Ranger Station were unable to locate any evidence of the two incendiary bombs dropped. The Glen seaplane was again recovered, but I-25 decided not to risk a third flight with the two remaining incendiary bombs. Captain Tagami took I-25 to rest "...on the bottom [of the harbor of Port Orford ] until night time.

At 0415 4 October 1942 I-25 torpedoed the 6,706 tonnes (6,600 long tons) tanker Camden en route from San Pedro, California, to Puget Sound with a cargo of 76,000 barrels (12,100 m^{3}) of gasoline. The damaged tanker was towed to the mouth of the Columbia River. When its draft was discovered to be too great to reach repair facilities in Portland, Oregon, another tow was arranged to Puget Sound; but the tanker was destroyed on 10 October by a fire of unknown origin during the second tow.

On the evening of 5 October 1942 I-25 torpedoed the Richfield Oil Company tanker Larry Doheny, which sank the next day. The cargo of 66,000 barrels (10,500 m^{3}) of oil was lost with 2 of the tanker's crew and 4 members of the United States Navy Armed Guard. Survivors reached Port Orford, Oregon on the evening of 6 October.

Two submarines were sighted on 11 October 1942 about 800 miles (1,300 km) off the coast of Washington as I-25 was returning to Japan. I-25 fired its last torpedo at the lead submarine, which sank in 20 seconds with the loss of all hands. I-25 reported sinking a U.S. submarine, but the submarine was actually Soviet L-16 which was sailing with L-15 en route from Vladivostok to the Panama Canal via Unalaska, Alaska, and San Francisco. United States Navy Chief Photographer's Mate Sergi Andreevich Mihailoff of Arcadia, California, was aboard L-16 as a liaison officer and interpreter, and was killed with the remainder of the submarine crew. The United States Navy Western Sea Frontier denied loss of any submarine and withheld information about the Soviet loss because, at the time, the Soviet Union was officially neutral in the war between Japan and the United States.

SS H.M. Storey was bringing fuel oil from Noumea, New Caledonia, in the South Pacific Ocean to Los Angeles. On May 17, 1943, I-25 torpedoed and fired shells at the ship. The attack killed two of the crew; 63 of the crew made it in to the ship's lifeboats before she sank. US destroyer USS Fletcher rescued the crew in the lifeboats and took them to Port Vila Efate, Vanuatu, in the South Pacific.

=== Loss ===
I-25 was most likely sunk by the destroyer USS Patterson on 25 August 1943 off the New Hebrides islands, approximately 150 miles (240 km) northeast of Espiritu Santo. Patterson was escorting a convoy from New Hebrides to the lower Solomon Islands when she made radar contact with a surfaced enemy submarine. Patterson closed to 4,000 yards as I-25 crash-dived, but Patterson dropped a series of depth charge patterns that sank I-25 with all hands following a massive underwater explosion at position 13-10S, 165-27E.

The loss of I-25 is somewhat controversial as she was one of 5 Japanese submarines sunk by Patterson, USS Ellet, USS Wadsworth, and USS Saufley off the New Hebrides islands between late August and early September 1943; Patterson and Ellet in particular both claimed submarine sinkings on the same day. However, sources generally agree Patterson sank I-25 on 25 August, Ellet sank both Ro-35 on 25 August and I-20 on 3 September, Wadsworth sank I-182 on 1 September, and Saufley sank Ro-101 on 15 September.

On 24 October 1943, the Imperial Japanese Navy announced that I-25 was presumed lost with all 100 men on board in the Fiji area, and it was struck from the Navy List on 1 December 1943.

== Summary of Raiding History ==
Date	Attack type/location	Vessel/weapon	Commander
21 June 1942	Fort Stevens, Oregon shelled	I-25 5.5-inch (140 mm) deck gun	Akiji Tagami
9 September 1942	1st aircraft bombing on Wheeler Ridge, 8 miles (13 km) east of Brookings, Oregon	I-25 launched two-man aircraft/pilot Fujita/navigator Okuda	Akiji Tagami
29 September 1942	2nd aircraft bombing near "Grassy Knob" east of Port Orford, Oregon	I-25 same aircraft, same crewmen	Akiji Tagami

Date	Ship name	Classification	Tonnage	Nationality	Result
20 June 1942	Fort Camosun	Steamship	7,126	Britain	Damaged
4 October 1942	Camden	Armed tanker	6,653	USA	Sunk
6 October 1942	Larry Dohney	Armed tanker	7,038	USA	Sunk
11 October 1942	L-16	Submarine	1,123	Russia	Sunk
18 May 1943	H. M. Storey	Steam tanker	10,763	USA	Sunk

== Bibliography ==
- Bob, Hackett; Kingsepp, Sander (2002). "IJN Submarine I-25: Tabular Record of Movement". CombinedFleet.com.
- Jenkins, David (1992). Battle Surface! Japan's Submarine War Against Australia 1942–44. Milsons Point NSW Australia: Random House Australia. pp. 158, 169. ISBN 0-09-182638-1.
- Jentschura, Hansgeorg; Dieter Jung, Peter Mickel. Warships of the Imperial Japanese Navy, 1869–1945. United States Naval Institute, 1977. Annapolis, Maryland, USA. ISBN 0-87021-893-X.
- Milanovich, Kathrin (2021). "The IJN Submarines of the I 15 Class". In Jordan, John (ed.). Warship 2021. Oxford, UK: Osprey Publishing. pp. 29–43. ISBN 978-1-4728-4779-9.
- Aviation History article
