= SS Montebello =

Sunken steam oil tanker

Coordinates: 35°35′30″N 121°16′30″W

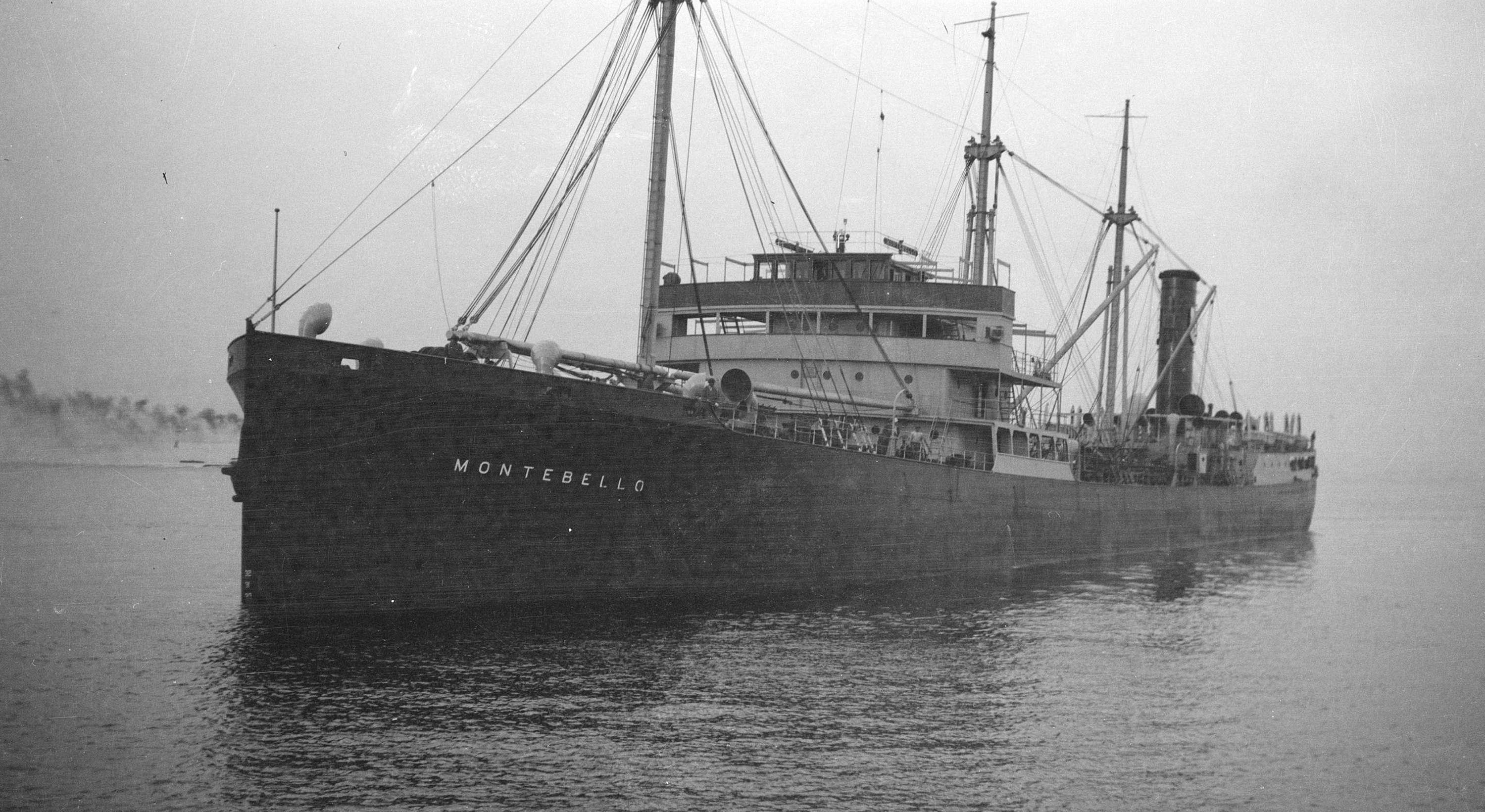
- SS Montebello in Vancouver, 1930s. Photograph by Walter E. Frost

History

United States
- Name: Montebello
- Namesake: Montebello
- Owner: Union Oil Company
- Builder: Southwestern Shipbuilding Co., San Pedro
- Cost: US$2,500,000
- Yard number: 21
- Laid down: April 20, 1920
- Launched: January 24, 1921
- Sponsored by: Miss Adelaide Stewart
- Commissioned: March 9, 1921
- Home port: Los Angeles
- Identification: US Official Number 221100; Call sign MCNH (1918–1933); Call sign KDPR (1934–1941)
- Fate: Sunk on December 23, 1941

General characteristics
- Type: Tanker
- Tonnage: 8,272 GRT; 5,107 NRT; 12,382 DWT
- Length: 440.4 ft (134.2 m)
- Beam: 58.2 ft (17.7 m)
- Depth: 32.8 ft (10.0 m)
- Installed power: 402 Nhp, 3,300 ihp
- Propulsion: Llewellyn Iron Works 4-cylinder quadruple expansion
- Speed: 11 knots (13 mph; 20 km/h)

Montebello was a steam oil tanker built in 1920–1921 by the Southwestern Shipbuilding Co. of San Pedro for Union Oil Company. It was designed to carry oil and petroleum products along the West Coast of the United States and Canada, as well as between the United States and Chile. In December 1941 the tanker was sunk on one of her regular trips by the Japanese submarine I-21.

== Design and construction ==
Early in 1920, the Union Oil Company of California decided to expand their South American business and placed an order for two large tankers of approximately 12,000 tons deadweight with Southwestern Shipbuilding Company. At the time, the tankers were the largest vessels of their kind ever to be constructed in California.

The keel laying for both vessels, future SS Montebello and SS La Placentia, was held on 20 April 1920 with over forty Union Oil representatives present at the ceremony. Montebello was the first of these vessels and was launched on January 24, 1921 (yard number 21), with Miss Adelaide Stewart, daughter of William L. Stewart, president of Union Oil, being the sponsor. The tanker was named after the Montebello oil fields, a major source for Union Oil Co.

The ship was built on the Isherwood principle of longitudinal framing, providing extra strength to the body of the vessel. The ship was shelter-deck type, had two main decks, and had its cargo space subdivided into eighteen main tanks and ten summer tanks which allowed for the carriage of up to 94,000 barrels of oil. The tanker had a cargo pump room located amidships with specially designed pumps to be able to unload her entire cargo in about twenty hours. In addition, the steamer was equipped with eight throttle reversing steam winches for quick loading and unloading of cargo from shelter deck spaces. She was also equipped with wireless apparatus, had submarine signal system installed and had electrical lights installed along the decks and in crew cabins.

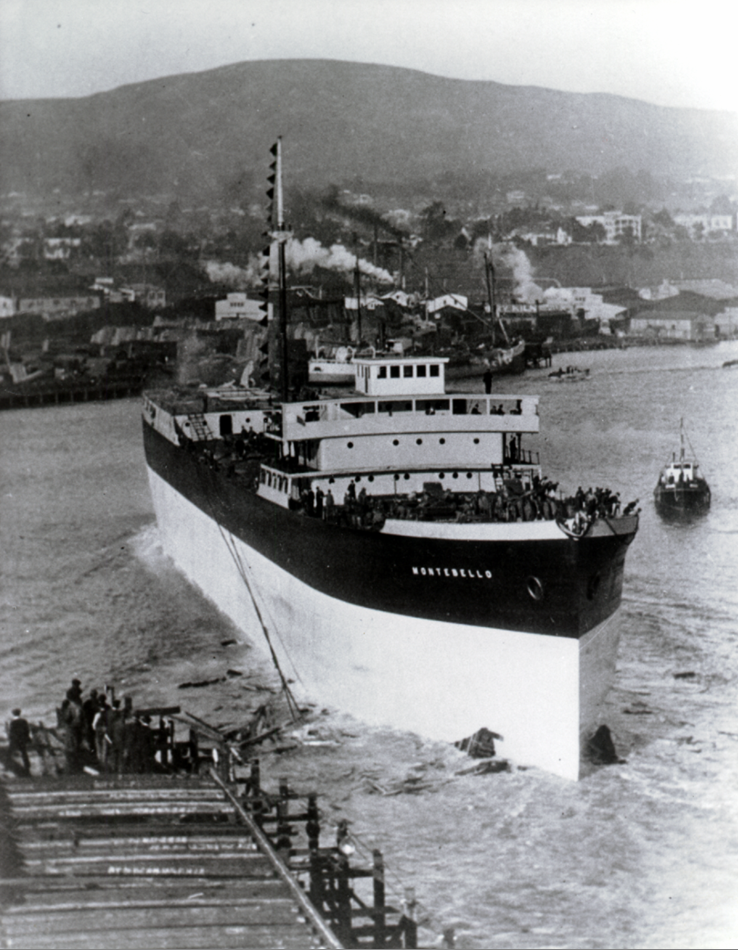

As built, the ship was 440.4 feet (134.2 m) long (between perpendiculars) and 58.2 feet (17.7 m) abeam, and had a depth of 32.8 feet (10.0 m). Montebello was originally assessed at 8,272 GRT and 5,107 NRT and had deadweight of approximately 12,500. The vessel had a steel hull with double bottom throughout and a single 3,300 ihp vertical reciprocating quadruple expansion steam engine, with cylinders of 24-inch (61 cm),34-inch (86 cm), 51-inch (130 cm) and 74-inch (190 cm) diameter with a 54-inch (140 cm) stroke, that drove a single screw propeller and moved the ship at up to 11 knots (13 mph; 20 km/h). The steam for the engine was supplied by three single-ended Scotch marine boilers fitted for oil fuel.

The sea trials were held on March 2, 1921, with the ship performing satisfactorily. Following their successful completion, Montebello was handed over to her owners on March 4 and after applying final touches, was commissioned on March 9.

== Operational history ==
Following delivery and commissioning, Montebello left Los Angeles for Port San Luis, the major oil storage and shipping facility for Union Oil, and arrived there on 10 March 1921. After loading a cargo of 81,000 barrels of oil the tanker left for San Francisco and reached her destination on March 12, successfully concluding her maiden voyage. Upon unloading the tanker departed San Francisco on March 14 bound for Vancouver via Port San Luis. After taking on board 41,000 barrels of fuel oil and 40,000 barrels of diesel fuel the tanker sailed out from Port San Luis on March 17 and reached her destination five days later. On her third trip the ship traveled to Puerto Lobos, one of the major oil storage ports in Mexico, and returned to San Pedro on 14 May 1921 carrying 11,000 tons of oil. The tanker then remained berthed in harbor until the end of August, and then re-entered the coast-wise service. As part of her service Montebello carried oil from Port San Luis to Union Oil refinery in Oleum, or from San Pedro to storage and refinery facilities at Martinez. She also made occasional trips along the Pacific coast to ports such as Vancouver, Portland or Seattle, and on occasion took her cargo to Honolulu. In 1924 the tanker became more involved in long haul operations conducting voyages to Hawaii and Canada with more frequency. In addition, Montebello started making trips to Balboa in the Panama Canal area and Chilean ports of Antofagasta, Iquique and Taltal. For example, on 8 July 1924 she delivered 10,000 tons of fuel oil to Balboa and on 6 January 1925 she left San Pedro carrying 76,801 barrels of oil bound for Antofagasta. In 1926 the service to the Panama Canal and Chile picked up significantly and became the tanker's primary routes of operation. Montebello remained in this service for the next five years at which point she was slowly over the next two years shifted back to coastline service along the West coast and to Hawaii.

During the night of 5 October 1930 while the tanker was at the Los Angeles Shipbuilding Corp. undergoing repairs she was boarded by a lone bandit who after shooting the third mate in the head proceeded to rob the safe in the captain's cabin and crew lockers getting away with nearly $3,000 in cash without being seen by any other witnesses. The police arrested a former Union Oil engine-room employee in connection with this robbery but he was later released due to lack of evidence against him.

In the second half of 1939 Montebello made three trips to the East Coast of the United States carrying on each occasion nearly 11,000 tons of crude oil to Baltimore and fuel oil to Boston. In November 1940 the tanker was chartered for one trip by Imperial Oil Shipping Co. to carry oil from Peru to Vancouver. Upon completion of the trip she returned to her usual duties.

=== Sinking ===
Montebello was slated to depart from Port San Luis some time before midnight on 21 December 1941. However, due to crew demanding increased war risk insurance payments, the departure was delayed until a replacement crew could be brought in from Los Angeles. The replacements arrived in the late evening of December 22, at which point it was learned that the ship's acting master suddenly became ill and had to be replaced too. After finding and signing on a new master, correcting paperwork and making final preparations Montebello finally sailed out from Port San Luis around 02:00 on December 23. The tanker was under command of captain Olof Walfrid Eckstrom, had a crew of thirty-eight and carried a cargo of 75,346 barrels of crude oil bound for Vancouver. The weather was overcast with drizzle but good visibility. At approximately 05:30 while about four miles west off Cambria, the captain noticed what appeared to be a submarine on the vessel's starboard side about half a mile distant. The submarine, later determined to be I-21, could be clearly seen in the darkness, and her conning tower and a deck gun were easily discernible. The captain immediately ordered the ship full speed ahead and to assume a zigzag course and informed the Navy about submarine sighting. Approximately ten minutes later I-21 fired two torpedoes at the tanker. One torpedo proved to be a dud, but the second one struck Montebello around #2 hold. Fortunately for the crew the hold where the torpedo struck was dry and did not contain any oil; however, the resulting explosion blew away the deck house and the radio room and knocked down the forward mast. An order to abandon ship was given and four lifeboats were launched. Seeing that the ship did not sink, the submarine proceeded to fire eight or nine shots at the hull of the stricken tanker. One shot hit the bow and blew it away speeding the tanker's sinking. At about 06:30 the ship started sinking rapidly and by 06:45 went completely under. The lifeboats were shot at by what appeared to be rifle fire from the submarine without injuring anyone. Three of the lifeboats containing thirty-three survivors were picked up by dispatched tug boats and landed in Cayucos. One lifeboat with the master in it reached the shore near San Simeon where it was wrecked. Everyone was saved by the watchers on the shore.

== Wreck and its cargo ==
In an expedition conducted on November 7, 1996, the submersible Delta descended with two men on board to the wreck at a depth of 880 feet (270 m) and found Montebello sitting upright on the bottom. Based on their observations it was concluded that a single torpedo hit Montebello just forward of the pump room. While the bow was broken from the impact with the sea floor, the overall condition of the wreck was thought to be quite good, giving rise to the concern that she could still hold her liquid cargo. When she went down, Montebello held 73,571 barrels (11,696.9 m^{3}) of crude oil along with 104,034 US gallons (393,810 L) of fuel oil for her engines.

In August 2010 the wreck was examined by a robot submarine from the Monterey Bay Aquarium Research Institute to determine whether the oil cargo was still on board and whether it posed a possible environmental threat. The expedition created three-dimension images of the ship using sonar, to be analyzed onshore. Jack Hunter, an archaeologist for Caltrans who examined the wreck in 1996 and compared the images from the 2010 expedition expressed concern that the wreck had deteriorated over the past 14 years and could represent a risk if the cargo leaked.

Further explorations of the wreck were scheduled for 2011 at an expected cost of $2.3 million, to be paid from a fund which oil companies pay into for such situations. After two weeks of extensive testing in October 2011, researchers determined that no crude oil remained in the tanker and such oil most likely was released from the vessel shortly after sinking and dissipated throughout the region.

The shipwreck was listed on the US National Register of Historic Places in 2016.
