= SS Emidio =

US steam ship

Coordinates: 41°45′1.96″N 124°11′47.95″W

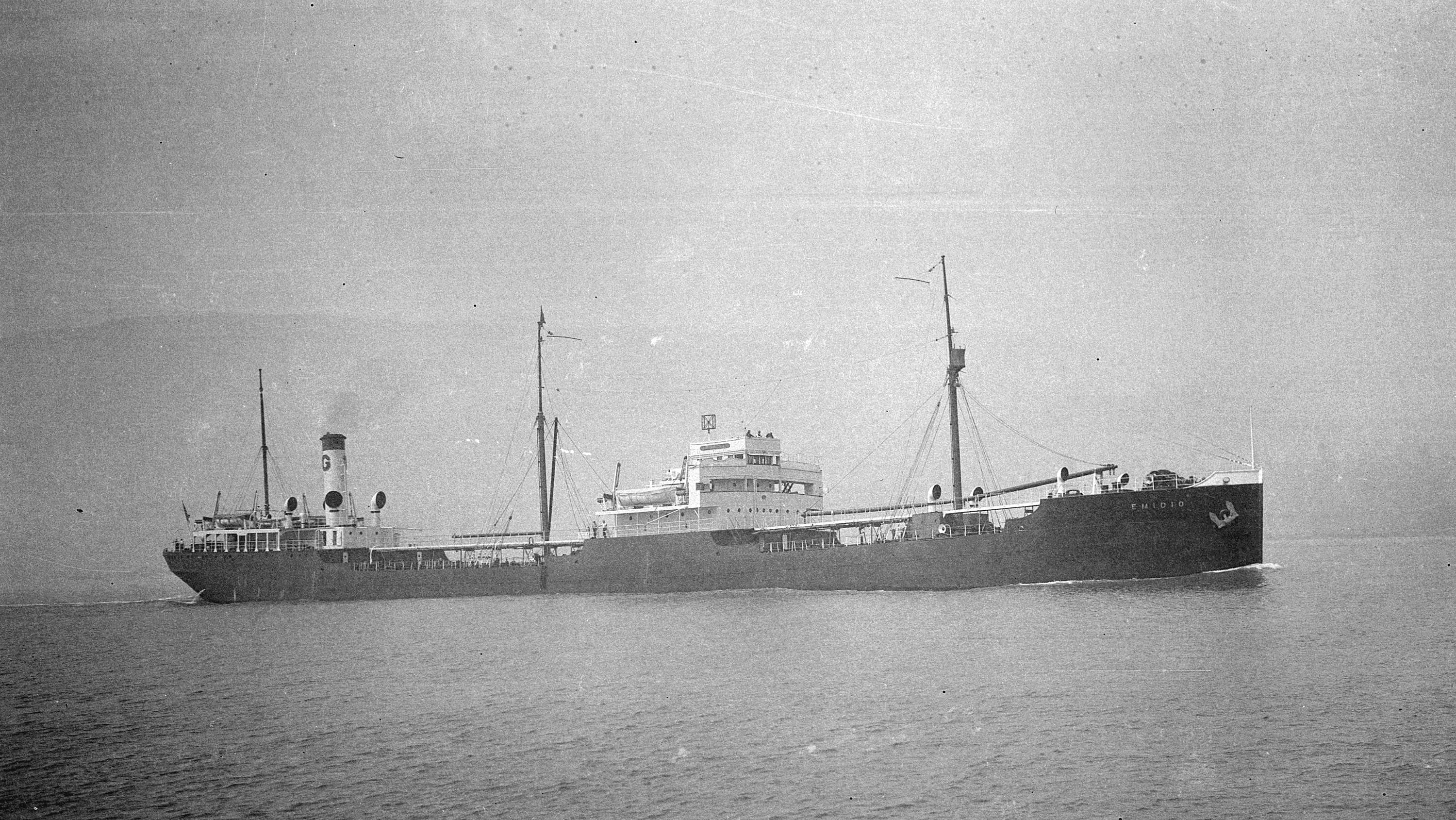
- SS Emidio in Vancouver, June 1932. Photograph by Walter E. Frost

History
- Name: Hammac (1921–1923); Emidio (1923–1941)
- Owner: USSB (1921–1923); General Petroleum Corp. (1923–1926); Socony-Vacuum Oil Co. (1926–1941)
- Operator: General Petroleum Corp. (1923–1926); Standard Transportation Co. (1926-1931); Standard-Vacuum Transportation Company (1931–1934); Socony-Vacuum Oil Co. (1935–1941)
- Ordered: 30 April 1918
- Builder: Bethlehem Shipbuilding Corp., Potrero
- Yard number: 5274
- Laid down: 30 November 1920
- Launched: 25 May 1921
- Completed: July 1921
- Maiden voyage: 14 March 1922
- Home port: San Francisco (1921–1926); New York (1926–1941)
- Identification: US Official Number 221460; Call sign MCWT (1926–1933); Call sign KDTJ (1934–1941)
- Fate: Wrecked, 20 December 1941

General characteristics
- Type: Design 1047 Tankship
- Tonnage: 6,900 GRT (1921-1936); 4,248 NRT (1921-1936); 6,912 GRT (1937-1941); 4,309 NRT (1937-1941); 9,980 DWT
- Length: 435.0 ft (132.6 m)
- Beam: 56.2 ft (17.1 m)
- Depth: 33.5 ft (10.2 m)
- Installed power: 422 nhp, 3,100 ihp (2,300 kW)
- Propulsion: Bethlehem Shipbuilding Corp. 3-cylinder triple expansion
- Speed: 11 knots (13 mph; 20 km/h)

Hammac was a steam tank ship built in 1920–1921 by Bethlehem Shipbuilding Corporation of Alameda for the United States Shipping Board as part of the wartime shipbuilding program of the Emergency Fleet Corporation (EFC) to restore the nation's Merchant Marine. Early in 1923 the vessel together with two other tankers was sold to General Petroleum Corporation and renamed Emidio. The tanker spent the vast majority of her career carrying oil along the West Coast of the United States as well as between West and East coast. In December 1941 she was shelled and damaged by the Japanese submarine I-17 and eventually wrecked with a loss of five crewmen.

== Design and construction ==
After the United States entry into World War I, a large shipbuilding program was undertaken to restore and enhance shipping capabilities both of the United States and their Allies. As part of this program, EFC placed orders with nation's shipyards for a large number of vessels of standard designs. Design 1047 tank ship was a standard tanker of approximately 10,100 tons deadweight designed by Bethlehem Shipbuilding Corp. and adopted by USSB.

Hammac was part of the order for six vessels placed by USSB with Bethlehem Shipbuilding Corporation on 30 April 1918 and was laid down on 30 November 1920 at the builder's shipyard at Potrero Point and launched on 25 May 1921 (yard number 5274). The ship was built on the Isherwood principle of longitudinal framing providing extra strength to the body of the vessel and had two main decks. The tanker had her machinery placed aft and a cargo pump room located amidships, and had cargo tanks constructed throughout the vessel with a total capacity to carry 3,369,862 gallons of oil. In addition, the ship had four booms and four winches to handle deck load and dry hold cargoes. The vessel had electric lights installed along the decks and was also equipped with wireless of De Forest type.

As built, the ship was 435.0 feet (132.6 m) long (between perpendiculars) and 56.2 feet (17.1 m) abeam, and had a depth of 33.5 feet (10.2 m). Hammac was originally assessed at 6,900 GRT and 4,248 NRT and had deadweight of approximately 10,000. The vessel had a steel hull, and a single 422 nhp (3,100 ihp, 2,300 kW) vertical triple expansion steam engine, with cylinders of 27-inch (69 cm), 47-inch (120 cm) and 78-inch (200 cm) diameter with a 48-inch (120 cm) stroke, that drove a single screw propeller and moved the ship at up to 11 knots (20 km/h; 13 mph). The steam for the engine was supplied by three single-ended Scotch boilers fitted for oil fuel.

The sea trials were held outside the Heads on 12–13 July 1921 with the tanker performing satisfactorily. Upon completion of the twelve hour long trial run, the ship returned to port and after applying final touches was handed over to the USSB.

== Operational history ==
Following the delivery to her owners the tanker was laid up in Benicia due to scarcity of cargo and overabundance of tonnage. Hammac remained idle until the end of January 1922 when demand picked up and it appeared the recession was easing. After undergoing maintenance, the ship was chartered for one trip by Union Oil to deliver gasoline to United Kingdom. At the time there was widespread confusion as to why the delivery was effected from the West Coast when it was cheaper and quicker to do the same from the East Coast of the United States. Nevertheless, after loading over 3,000,000 gallons of gasoline the tanker departed San Francisco on 14 March 1922 bound for Thames Haven. Hammac passed through the Panama Canal on 28–30 March and reached her destination on 21 April. After unloading her cargo, the tanker left England on 27 April and arrived at Port Eads on 19 May, successfully concluding her maiden voyage.

The tanker conducted one more trip carrying oil for Union Oil from the Gulf ports to Philadelphia before being switched to molasses trade. In that role Hammac carried molasses in bulk from Cuba to Gulf ports or Europe. For example, in December 1922 she brought in approximately 9,500 tons of molasses to Rotterdam. On her next trip the ship brought in a cargo of beet molasses from Holland to Baltimore. Due to lack of storage space for this type of cargo, it had to be unloaded into a discarded tanker Brindina. In March 1923 several tankers including Hammac, still in the USSB possession were sold to Union Oil and General Petroleum Corporation. Following the tanker's arrival in Baltimore she was inspected and transferred to her new owners and departed for West Coast on 26 May reaching San Francisco on 15 June. Under new ownership, Hammac conducted one trip with a cargo of gasoline to Philadelphia in July 1923 before returning to West Coast where she was renamed Emidio after the San Emidio oil fields.

In 1923-1924 the tanker was largely involved in transportation of gasoline from General Petroleum refineries on California to London, with occasional trips up the West Coast. For example, in January 1924 she left San Pedro with 75,000 barrels of gasoline bound for London, and in November 1924 she carried 66,000 barrels of oil to Seattle. In 1925 Emidio was shifted from her international duties to domestic, carrying oil and gasoline to ports both on East and West Coast of the United States, although she made one trip to Hamburg in September 1925. For example, the tanker brought 74,000 barrels of gasoline from San Pedro to Baltimore in August 1925. In 1926 through major part of 1928 the tanker continued to mainly serve her West to East Coast route. Early in 1926 rumors spread about possible merger between General Petroleum and Standard Oil of New York. These rumors were confirmed when representatives from both companies met in March 1926 discussing the proposed merger. Following these successful negotiations both companies held shareholder meetings on 17 May 1926 which approved the proposed merger between the oil concerns. As a result, all assets including vessels of General Petroleum passed to Standard Oil of New York, however, General Petroleum continued to operate in California under its own name.

Starting in August 1928 Emidio was shifted largely to West Coast operation, carrying oil and petroleum products to ports of Seattle, Portland and Tacoma. Starting in January 1929 she also commenced making occasional trips to Vancouver, first arriving there on 17 January 1929. The tanker remained in her coastwise service largely through the end of her career with some minor interruptions. In August 1931 while on passage from San Pedro for Oakland Emidio struck an underwater ledge off Point Arguello. The vessel made it to her destination where she was put into drydock for examination. The ship returned to service in approximately a month after undergoing repairs to her bottom at the cost of about US$55,000. Early in 1934 Emidio proceeded to East Coast again carrying nearly 9,500 tons of petroleum products to New York. The ship stayed in Gulf to East Coast trade for about three months carrying oil from Beaumont to refineries in Philadelphia before returning to West Coast in early June.

In May 1938 Emidio conducted one trip to Hawaii with a cargo of fuel oil arriving at Pearl Harbor on 30 May. In October 1938 the vessel sailed with gasoline to Manila and Shanghai returning to West Coast at the end of December. Emidio was again chartered by Union Oil-Shell Oil venture to carry fuel oil to Boston in February 1939 returning to California in May. The tanker again returned to the Atlantic in July 1939 with a cargo of fuel oil bound for Boston. While there Emidio was involved with carrying petroleum products to and from Aruba. She returned to Los Angeles in October 1939 carrying over 10,000 tons of fuel oil, and in December the tanker passed through the Panama Canal on her way to Curaçao with 9,600 tons of kerosene distillates from California refineries. Subsequently, Emidio made one trip between Aruba and Balboa bringing approximately 10,500 tons of fuel oil for fleet operations there. On her final Atlantic voyage she passed through the Panama Canal in early February 1940 carrying about 10,300 tons of fuel oil from Aruba bound for Los Angeles. Upon arrival in California Emidio resumed her coastwise service there. In August 1940 Emidio was slated to travel to Japan with a cargo of oil, however, this trip was not allowed by the Maritime Commission. In October 1940 Emidio made another trip to Pearl Harbor during an extensive ongoing expansion of Naval facilities in the Hawaii. On her next voyage she sailed with cargo of fuel oil for Manila at the end of November 1940 and upon return in January 1941 returned to her coastwise duties.

With the hostilities raging in Europe and the Atlantic as well as deteriorating relations between United States and Japan, all General Petroleum tankers had American flag painted on their sides as neutrality markers in June 1941. By October 1941 Emidio was the only General Petroleum tanker operating along the West Coast with the remainder being shifted to Gulf and East Coast trade.

=== Sinking ===
Emidio departed on her last journey from Seattle on 18 December 1941 bound for San Pedro. The tanker was under command of captain Clark A. Farrow, had a crew of 36 and was sailing in ballast after unloading her usual cargo in Seattle. The trip was rather uneventful until the early afternoon of 20 December. While Emidio was about 20 nautical miles (37 km) off Blunts Reef, a bar few miles offshore of Cape Mendocino, lookouts spotted a submarine. The captain ordered the course change and increased the speed of the vessel, however, the submarine increased her speed too and closed in quickly to within a quarter mile of the tanker. At approximately 15:15 the Japanese submarine I-17 fired a shot at the vessel, forcing the captain to stop and order the crew to abandon ship. At the same time, the radio operator on board the tanker sent out an alert to the US Navy. As the crew rushed to lower the lifeboats, the submarine continued shooting at the tanker from its 14 cm (5.5 in) deck gun hitting it five times. One of the shells knocked off an unlaunched lifeboat causing its three crew members to fall into water and eventually drown in choppy seas. While the crew was disembarking the submarine stopped shooting and submerged. Two planes arrived at the scene and dropped depth charges at approximate submarine position with unknown result. After the planes left I-17 surfaced and fired a single torpedo at the tanker, hitting it in the stern. The torpedo passed through the engine room and exploded killing two out of three men still working in there.

Thirty one survivors managed to get into two lifeboats and a workboat and started to row towards the shore. After nearly sixteen hours at sea they finally reached Blunts Reef lightship near Cape Mendocino south of Humboldt Bay. There they were picked up by the cutter Shawnee and taken to Eureka. Emidio was left by the crew in the sinking condition with her stern submerged, however, the tanker managed to stay afloat and slowly drifted up the coast of California until it ran aground on the rocks off Crescent City in early January 1942. The wreck eventually broke into two, with the bow section drifting into the harbor, where it laid until scrapped in 1959. The remainder of the hull is still in the harbor and is marked by a commemorative plaque. The site of the sinking of Emidio has been declared a California Historical Landmark #497.

The bow of the Emidio is currently in the city park of Crescent City, California.

== Awards ==
Louis George Finch, able seaman aboard SS Emidio was given the Merchant Marine Distinguished Service Medal by the president of the United States. This was for his extraordinary courage and disregard of his own safety in voluntarily going into the sea to lighten an overload lifeboat. He stayed in water for one and half hours till another lifeboat came. For the president the award was given by Admiral Emory S. Land.

== Other sources ==
- "Del Norte". California Historical Landmarks. Office of Historic Preservation.
- "The Attack on the SS Emidio". California and the Second World War. The California State Military Museum.
- "Wreck of the SS Emidio". USA - California - Crescent City. Wikimapia.
