= Japanese submarine I-15 =

1940 submarine of the Imperial Japanese Navy

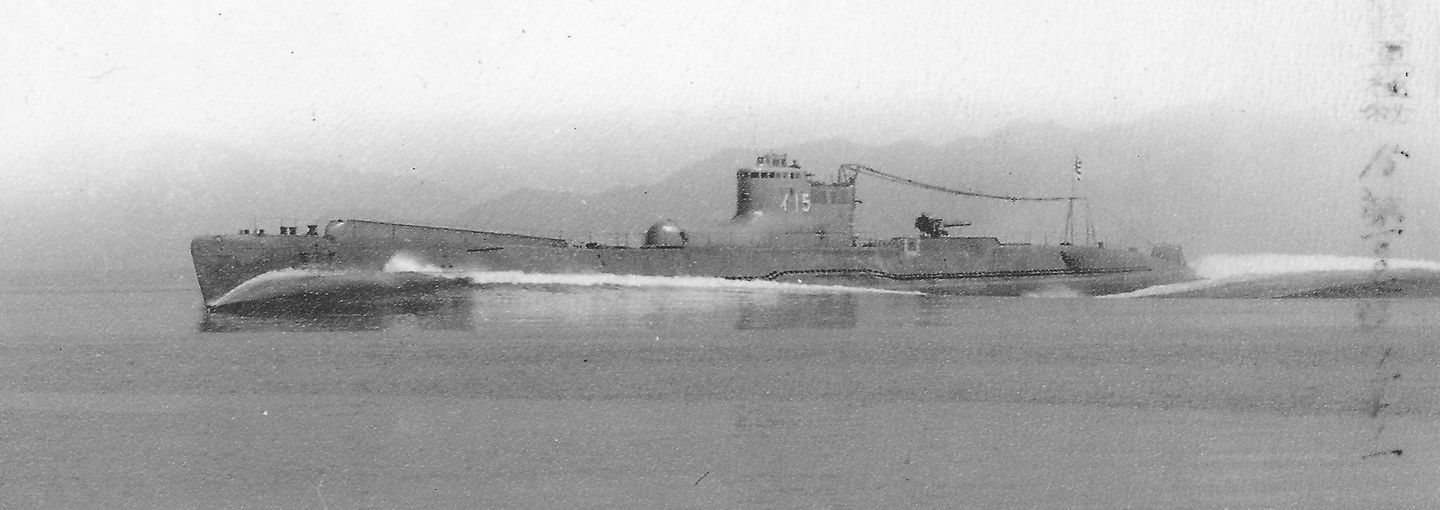
- I-15 during her initial sea trials.

History

Japan
- Name: Submarine No. 37
- Builder: Kure Naval Arsenal, Kure, Japan
- Laid down: 25 January 1938
- Renamed: I-15
- Launched: 7 March 1939
- Commissioned: 30 September 1940
- Fate: Sunk 10 November 1942
- Stricken: 24 December 1942

General characteristics
- Class & type: Type B1 submarine
- Displacement: 2,584 tons surfaced; 3,654 tons submerged
- Length: 108.7 m (357 ft)
- Beam: 9.3 m (31 ft)
- Draft: 5.14 m (16.9 ft)
- Propulsion: 2 diesels: 12,400 hp (9,200 kW); Electric motors: 2,000 hp (1,500 kW)
- Speed: 23.5 knots (43.5 km/h) surfaced; 8 knots (15 km/h) submerged
- Range: 14,000 nautical miles (26,000 km) at 16 knots (30 km/h)
- Test depth: 100 m (328 ft)
- Complement: 94
- Armament: 6 × 533 mm (21 in) forward torpedo tubes; 17 torpedoes; 1 × 14 cm/40 (5.5-in) 11th Year Type naval gun
- Aircraft carried: 1 Yokosuka E14Y floatplane

I-15 was an Imperial Japanese Navy B1 type submarine commissioned in 1940 that served during World War II. She supported the Japanese attack on Pearl Harbor, operated off the United States West Coast, and took part in Operation K-1, the Aleutian Islands campaign, and the Guadalcanal campaign, including the Battle of the Eastern Solomons and the Battle of the Santa Cruz Islands, before she was sunk in November 1942 during her fourth war patrol.

== Construction and commissioning ==
I-15 was laid down on 25 January 1938 by the Kure Naval Arsenal at Kure, Japan, with the name Submarine No. 37. She had been renamed I-15 by the time she was launched on 7 March 1939. She was completed and commissioned on 30 September 1940.

== Service history ==
=== September 1940–December 1941 ===
Upon commissioning, I-15 was attached to the Yokosuka Naval District. On 15 November 1940, she and the submarine I-16 were assigned to Submarine Division 1 in Submarine Squadron 1 in the 6th Fleet.

As the Imperial Japanese Navy began to deploy for the upcoming conflict in the Pacific, Submarine Squadron 1 was assigned to the Advance Force, and I-15 departed Yokosuka, Japan, on 21 November 1941 in company with the submarines I-9, I-17, and I-25, bound for the waters of the Hawaiian Islands to participate in Operation Z, the Japanese attack on Pearl Harbor that would bring Japan and the United States into World War II. While the submarines were en route, they received the message "Climb Mount Niitaka 1208" (Japanese: Niitakayama nobore 1208) from the Combined Fleet on 2 December 1941, indicating that war with the Allies would commence on 8 December 1941 Japan time, which was on 7 December 1941 on the other side of the International Date Line in Hawaii.

=== World War II ===
==== First war patrol ====
On 7 December 1941, the day of the Pearl Harbor attack, I-15 was on patrol north of Oahu with orders to reconnoiter Hawaiian waters and attack any American ships that sortied from Pearl Harbor. On 10 December, the submarine I-6 reported sighting a U.S. Navy task force including a Lexington-class aircraft carrier and two cruisers steaming northeastward from Oahu, and I-9, I-15, I-17, I-25, and the submarines I-19, I-21, and I-23 received orders to intercept and sink the aircraft carrier and set out in pursuit of it at full speed. Their search for it was unsuccessful.

On 13 December 1941, Japanese Imperial General Headquarters ordered the submarines of the 6th Fleet to bombard the United States West Coast. The 6th Fleet′s commander, Vice Admiral Mitsumi Shimizu, in turn ordered I-9, I-15, I-17, I-19, I-21, I-23, I-25, and the submarines I-10 and I-26 each to fire 30 rounds at targets on the U.S. West Coast on the evening of 25 December 1941, with the commander of Submarine Squadron 1, Rear Admiral Tsutomu Sato aboard his flagship I-9, in overall command of the bombardment. I-15 received these orders on 14 December 1941 and proceeded to her designated patrol area west of the Farallon Islands. She surfaced off the Farallons around midnight on the night of 17–18 December 1941 to recharge her batteries, and her commanding officer permitted her crew to come on deck to see the lights of San Francisco, California, which were visible to the south.

On 22 December 1941 the commander-in-chief of the Combined Fleet, Admiral Isoroku Yamamoto, postponed the bombardment until 27 December. On 27 December 1941, with most of the submarines tasked with carrying out the bombardment low on fuel and amid concerns on the Naval General Staff that a bombardment of populous areas such as San Francisco and Los Angeles, California, would inflict significant civilian casualties and invite retaliation by the United States, Shimizu cancelled the bombardment. I-15 headed for Kwajalein in the Marshall Islands, concluding her patrol with her arrival there on 11 January 1942, apparently sighted by the U.S. Navy submarine USS Tautog, which reported seeing three Japanese submarines arrive at Kwajalein that day.

==== Operation K-1 ====
On 1 February 1942, planes from the U.S. Navy aircraft carrier USS Enterprise raided Kwajalein, and I-9, I-15, I-17, I-19, and I-25 submerged to the harbor bottom at a depth of 150 feet (46 m) to avoid attack. Two hours after the air raid ended, 6th Fleet Headquarters ordered Submarine Squadron 1, including I-9, I-15, I-17, I-19, I-23, I-25, I-26, and the submarines Ro-61 and Ro-62, to put to sea to find and attack Enterprise.

After an unsuccessful search for Enterprise, I-15, I-19, I-23, and I-26 were recalled to Kwajalein on 3 February 1942 to participate in Operation K-1, an attack on Pearl Harbor in which two Imperial Japanese Navy Kawanishi H8K (Allied reporting name "Emily") flying boats were to fly from Wotje Atoll in the Marshall Islands to the French Frigate Shoals in the Northwestern Hawaiian Islands, refuel from I-15, I-19, and I-26 there, and then fly on to attack Pearl Harbor 500 nautical miles (930 km; 580 mi) to the east-southeast. I-23 was to patrol south of Hawaii to provide weather reports and an air-sea rescue capability if either or both of the flying boats were forced down, while I-9, which remained at sea without returning to Kwajalein, was to operate in an area halfway between Wotje Atoll and the French Frigate Shoals to transmit a radio beacon signal to help the flying boats navigate during the first leg of their flight. On 5 February 1942, I-15 arrived at Kwajalein, where she, I-19, and I-26 disembarked their Yokosuka E14Y (Allied reporting name "Glen") floatplanes to make room for six fuel tanks each in their hangars for the storage of aviation gasoline with which to refuel the flying boats.

I-15 got underway from Kwajalein on 20 February 1942 to intercept U.S. Navy Task Force 11, centered around the aircraft carrier USS Lexington, which had aborted a planned raid on the Japanese base at Rabaul after its detection by Japanese reconnaissance aircraft. I-15 did not find Task Force 11, and on 2 March 1942 abandoned her search to proceed to the French Frigate Shoals to support Operation K-1. She and I-19 arrived at the French Frigate Shoals on 4 March and, while I-26 waited at sea as a reserve, refueled the H8K flying boats when they arrived after sunset. The two aircraft soon took off again, and in the predawn hours of 5 March 1942 dropped eight 250-kilogram (551 lb) bombs over Honolulu, inflicting little damage and no casualties due to the overcast conditions, before flying back to the Marshall Islands. I-15, I-19, and I-26 subsequently returned to Japan, arriving at Yokosuka on 21 March 1942 to begin an overhaul.

==== March–May 1942 ====
While I-15, I-19, I-25, and I-26 were in drydock at Yokosuka, 16 United States Army Air Forces B-25 Mitchell medium bombers launched from the aircraft carrier USS Hornet struck targets in Japan on 18 April 1942 in the Doolittle Raid. One B-25 bombed and damaged the light aircraft carrier Ryūhō, which was undergoing conversion from the submarine tender Taigei in a nearby drydock. I-15 suffered no damage or casualties in the raid.

==== Second war patrol ====
With her overhaul complete, I-15 got underway from Yokosuka on 15 May 1942 to begin her second war patrol. She reached Ōminato in northern Honshu on 17 May, then departed in company with I-9, I-17, and I-19 to proceed to the Aleutian Islands. She was reassigned to the Northern Force on 20 May, and on 25 May conducted a reconnaissance of Adak Island. On 26 May, she was diverted to provide support to the aircraft carriers Ryūjō and Jun'yō as they deployed to the Aleutians area, then returned to her patrol area south of the Aleutians.

On 27 May 1942, the Japanese began the preliminary stages of Operation AL, the invasion of the Aleutian Islands, and that day I-15 conducted a periscope reconnaissance of Kodiak on Kodiak Island. The Aleutian Islands campaign began with an attack on Dutch Harbor on Amaknak Island by planes from Ryūjō and Jun'yō on 3–4 June 1942, and on 5 June Japanese forces occupied Attu in the western Aleutians without opposition. Early on the morning of 7 June, I-15 reconnoitered Kiska, and Japanese forces occupied that island as well later in the day, also without opposition. Meanwhile, I-9, I-15, I-17, and I-19 formed a patrol line west of Kiska to search for a force of U.S. Navy cruisers reportedly in the area, moving from south to north in their search but finding no American ships.

I-15 conducted a periscope reconnaissance of Dutch Harbor on 19 June 1942. Reassigned to Submarine Division 2 in Submarine Squadron 1 as well as to the Advance Force on 30 June, she headed back to Japan, arriving at Yokosuka on 7 July 1942.

==== Third war patrol ====
The Guadalcanal campaign began on 7 August 1942 with United States Marine Corps landings on Guadalcanal in the southeastern Solomon Islands. Submarine Division 2, consisting of I-15, I-17, and I-19, received orders to proceed to the waters east of the Solomons, and I-15 got underway from Yokosuka accordingly on 15 August 1942 to begin her third war patrol. Arriving in their assigned area east of the Santa Cruz Islands on 23 August 1942, the submarines of Submarine Division 2 formed a patrol line to cover the landing of Japanese troops on Guadalcanal in Operation KA.

The Battle of the Eastern Solomons began on 24 August 1942, and at 01:45 local time on 25 August I-15 sighted a U.S. Navy task force which she identified as consisting of the aircraft carrier Enterprise, the battleship USS North Carolina, two cruisers, and five destroyers. Hoping to mount a coordinated attack with I-17, I-15 attempted to contact I-17 with sonar pings using Morse code, but was unsuccessful. Two of the U.S. destroyers detected I-17 and attacked her with depth charges. After the depth-charge attack on I-17 ended, I-15 surfaced and maintained contact with the U.S. task force until 03:00. I-15 and I-17 then received orders to pursue the task force.

The Battle of the Eastern Solomons ended on 25 August 1942. On 26 August, the Advance Force ordered I-15, I-17, I-19, I-26, and the submarines I-11, I-33, I-174, and I-175 to deploy from the south to the east of San Cristobal in the southeastern Solomons to interdict American supplies and reinforcements for Guadalcanal. Around midnight on 28 August, I-15 was east of San Cristobal when she sighted what she identified as an American aircraft carrier steaming south. I-15, I-17, and I-33 received orders to pursue it, but made no further contacts with U.S. ships.

I-9, I-15, I-17, I-19, I-21, I-26, I-33, and the submarine I-24 took up patrol stations between Ndeni in the Santa Cruz Islands and San Cristobal on 10 September 1942. On 13 September, an H8K flying boat reported an Allied task force 345 nautical miles (639 km; 397 mi) south-southeast of Tulagi, and I-9, I-15, I-17, I-21, I-24, I-26, I-33, and the submarine I-31 received orders to form a patrol line to intercept it. At 11:45 on 15 September, I-19 fired a spread of six torpedoes at the aircraft carrier USS Wasp, two of which hit her and inflicted fatal damage. Three of the torpedoes that missed Wasp continued their runs to nearly the limit of their range; one of them hit the battleship North Carolina, one hit the destroyer USS O'Brien, and one barely missed the aircraft carrier Hornet. Several accounts of the action credit I-15 with torpedoing North Carolina, but I-19 fired all the torpedoes. I-15 was nearby, however, and was able to confirm that I-19 sank Wasp.

On 20 September 1942, I-15, I-17, I-19, I-26, I-33, I-174, and I-175 left the patrol area. I-15 concluded her patrol with her arrival at Truk on 25 September 1942.

==== Fourth war patrol ====
Reassigned to the 2nd Reconnaissance Unit — and later directly to Submarine Squadron 1 — I-15 departed Truk on 5 October 1942 to begin her fourth war patrol. She arrived in Indispensable Strait in the Solomon Islands on 12 October, and that day refueled an Imperial Japanese Navy Aichi E13A1 (Allied reporting name "Jake") floatplane of the "R" Area Air Force based at Shortland Island and Rekata Bay; the aircraft sighted a U.S. Navy task force centered around the aircraft carrier Hornet east of Malaita on the morning of 13 October. On 14 October, she refueled an E13A1 based on the seaplane carrier Chitose. She again fueled an E13A1 on 16 October, and the aircraft went on to sight Hornet, allowing the Japanese to order I-26 into an area that would give her a chance of intercepting Hornet. On 18 October 1942, I-15 departed Indispensable Strait.

On 19 October 1942, Submarine Squadron 1 received orders to patrol west of Espiritu Santo. On 22 October, I-15, I-17, and I-26 received assignments to patrol west of San Cristobal to prevent U.S. supplies and reinforcements from reaching Guadalcanal.

The Battle of the Santa Cruz Islands broke out on 26 October 1942. Operating 200 nautical miles (370 km; 230 mi) west of Espiritu Santo at 03:50 on 27 October, I-15 sighted a large U.S. task force steaming south from the Santa Cruz Islands. When the task force took evasive action to avoid a submarine contact — probably a detection of I-15 — the battleship USS South Dakota and destroyer USS Mahan suffered major damage when they collided with one another at 04:14. Later on 27 October, I-15 moved to a new patrol area southwest of San Cristobal, from which she transmitted a routine situation report at 17:01 on 3 November 1942. The Japanese never heard from her again.

==== Loss ====
During a voyage from Espiritu Santo to Guadalcanal with a cargo of supplies, the U.S. Navy fast minesweeper USS Southard sighted I-15 on the surface recharging her batteries off Cape Recherche on San Cristobal at 02:30 on 10 November 1942. Southard closed the range and at 02:31 opened 4.5-inch (114 mm) gunfire on I-15, which crash-dived. I-15 fired two torpedoes at Southard, both of which missed. Southard gained sonar contact on I-15 at 02:42, and over the next several hours made six depth-charge attacks. The crew of the Japanese submarine I-171 was patrolling in the vicinity and heard the depth charges explode. Damage from the depth-charge attacks forced I-15 to surface at the south end of Indispensable Strait at 10:03, and Southard opened gunfire on her at a range of 2,000 yards (1,830 m). She quickly hit I-15′s conning tower, and I-15 sank by the bow at 10°13′S 161°09′E with the loss of her entire crew of 91.

On 5 December 1942, the Imperial Japanese Navy declared I-15 to be presumed lost with all hands in the Guadalcanal area. The Japanese removed her from the Navy list on 24 December 1942.

Southard sometimes is credited with sinking the submarine I-172 rather than I-15 on 10 November 1942, but this appears to be in error. On 14 December 1942, almost five weeks after Southard sank I-15, the U.S. Navy submarine USS Wahoo claimed the sinking of a Japanese submarine which she misidentified as I-15.

== Sources ==
- Hackett, Bob & Kingsepp, Sander. IJN Submarine I-15: Tabular Record of Movement. http://www.combinedfleet.com/I-15.htm. Retrieved on March 15, 2009.
- Milanovich, Kathrin (2021). "The IJN Submarines of the I 15 Class". In Jordan, John (ed.). Warship 2021. Oxford, UK: Osprey Publishing. pp. 29–43. ISBN 978-1-4728-4779-9.
- Morison, Samuel Eliot. The Struggle for Guadalcanal, pp. 131–34, 233. Volume 5 of The History of United States Naval Operations in World War II (1949). Edison, NJ: Castle Books, 2001.
- O'Kane, Richard H. (1987), Wahoo: The Patrols of America's Most Famous WWII Submarine, Presidio Press, ISBN 978-0-89141-301-1.
