= Type B1 submarine =

Japanese submarine type (1940s)

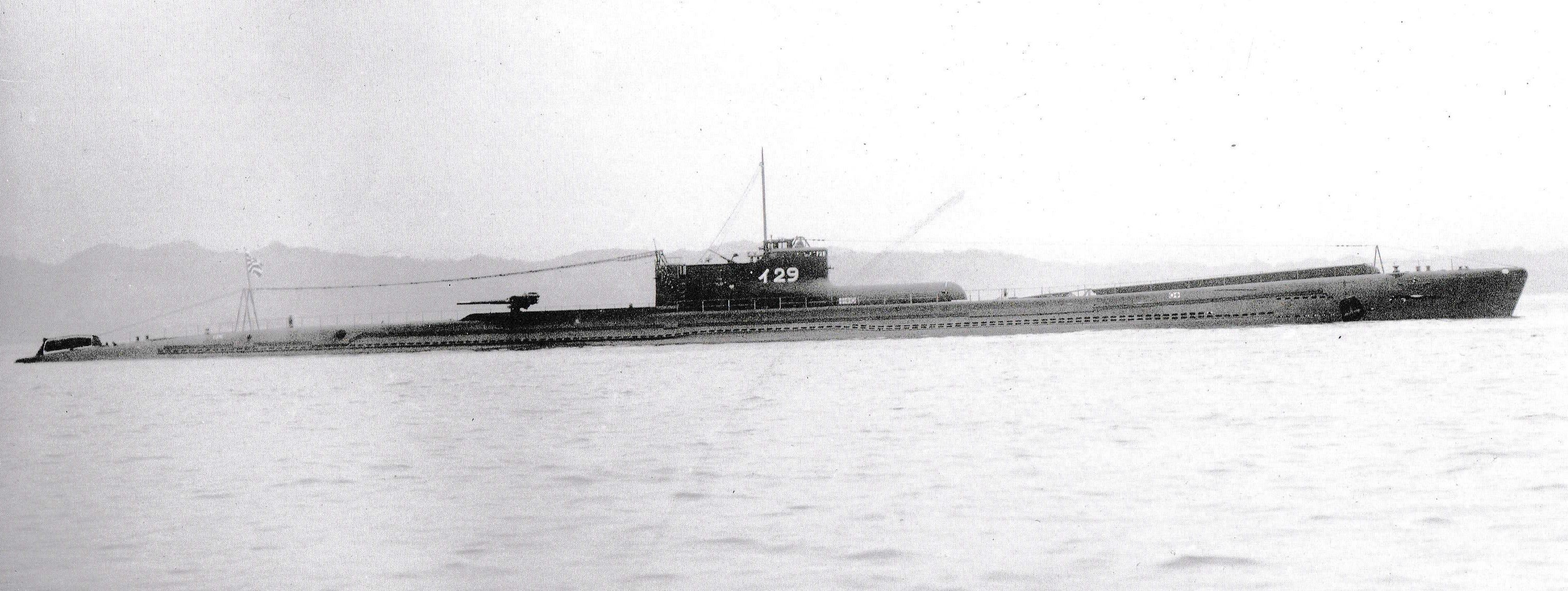
- I-29

Class overview
- Name: B1 class
- Operators: Imperial Japanese Navy
- Preceded by: Type J3 submarine
- Succeeded by: Type B2 submarine
- Completed: 18
- Lost: 17
- Scrapped: 1

General characteristics
- Class & type: Cruiser submarine
- Displacement: 2,631 tonnes (2,589 long tons) surfaced; 3,713 tonnes (3,654 long tons) submerged
- Length: 108.7 m (356 ft 8 in) overall
- Beam: 9.3 m (30 ft 6 in)
- Draft: 5.1 m (16 ft 9 in)
- Installed power: 12,400 bhp (9,200 kW) (diesel); 2,000 hp (1,500 kW) (electric motor)
- Propulsion: Diesel-electric; 2 × diesel engine; 1 × electric motor
- Speed: 23.5 knots (43.5 km/h; 27.0 mph) surfaced; 8 knots (15 km/h; 9.2 mph) submerged
- Range: 14,000 nmi (26,000 km; 16,000 mi) at 16 knots (30 km/h; 18 mph) surfaced; 96 nmi (178 km; 110 mi) at 3 knots (5.6 km/h; 3.5 mph) submerged
- Test depth: 100 m (330 ft)
- Crew: 94
- Armament: 6 × bow 533 mm (21 in) torpedo tubes; 1 × 14 cm (5.5 in) deck gun; 2 × single 25 mm (1 in) Type 96 anti-aircraft guns
- Aircraft carried: 1 × floatplane
- Aviation facilities: 1 × catapult

The Type B1 submarine (巡潜乙型潜水艦, Junsen Otsu-gata sensuikan; lit. "Cruiser submarine type B"), also called the I-15-class submarine (伊一五型潜水艦, I-jū-go-gata sensuikan) after its lead submarine, was the first group of boats of the Type B cruiser submarines built for the Imperial Japanese Navy (IJN) during the 1940s. In total 20 were built, starting with I-15, which gave the series their alternative name.

== Design and description ==
The Type B submarines were derived from the earlier KD6 sub-class of the Kaidai class and were equipped with an aircraft to enhance their scouting ability. They displaced 2,631 tonnes (2,589 long tons) surfaced and 3,713 tonnes (3,654 long tons) submerged. The submarines were 108.7 meters (356 ft 8 in) long, had a beam of 9.3 meters (30 ft 6 in) and a draft of 5.1 meters (16 ft 9 in). They had a diving depth of 100 meters (330 ft).

For surface running, the boats were powered by two 6,200-brake-horsepower (4,623 kW) diesel engines, each driving one propeller shaft. When submerged each propeller was driven by a 1,000-horsepower (746 kW) electric motor. They could reach 23.6 knots (43.7 km/h; 27.2 mph) on the surface and 8 knots (15 km/h; 9.2 mph) underwater. On the surface, the B1s had a range of 14,000 nautical miles (26,000 km; 16,000 mi) at 16 knots (30 km/h; 18 mph); submerged, they had a range of 96 nmi (178 km; 110 mi) at 3 knots (5.6 km/h; 3.5 mph).

The boats were armed with six internal bow 53.3 cm (21.0 in) torpedo tubes and carried a total of 17 torpedoes. They were also armed with a single 140 mm (5.5 in)/40 deck gun and two single mounts for 25 mm (1 in) Type 96 anti-aircraft guns. In the Type Bs, the aircraft hangar was faired into the base of the conning tower. A single catapult was positioned on the forward deck. Late in the war, some of the submarines had their aircraft hangar removed, to replace it with an additional 14 cm gun. In 1944, I-36 and I-37 had their aircraft hangar and catapult removed so that they could carry four Kaiten manned torpedoes, with I-36 later being further modified to carry six.

== Service ==
The series was rather successful, especially at the beginning of the war.

- I-17 shelled an oil field up the beach from Santa Barbara and damaged a pump house in Elwood in February 1942. I-17 sank the tanker SS Stanvac Manila with the torpedo boats PT-165 and PT-173 aboard her, and destroyed the tanker SS Emido, totaling over 17,000 tons sunk.
- On 15 September 1942 I-19 fired six torpedoes at the aircraft carrier USS Wasp, three of which hit the and sank the Wasp over several hours. The three remaining torpedoes went on for several thousand meters and hit another carrier force, which sank the destroyer USS O'Brien and damaged the battleship USS North Carolina. I-19 additionally sank or destroyed 3 Liberty ships between April to August 1943, totaling over 43,000-tons sunk.
- I-21 sank or destroyed 11 cargo ships between December 1941 and November 1943, totaling nearly 71,000 tons sunk; has been credited with sinking USS Porter but this is unlikely.
- I-23 destroyed the 2,119-ton cargo ship SS Dorothy Phillips.
- I-25 conducted one of the few attacks on the continental United States in September 1942. I-25 sank the Russian submarine L-16 and the tankers Camden, Larry Doheny, and H.M Storey, totaling nearly 25,000-tons sunk.
- I-26 sank the US Army chartered merchant ship SS Cynthia Olson about 1,000 miles northeast of Pearl Harbor on 8 December 1941, the first US ship sunk after America's entry into WW2, and sank or destroyed a total of 9 cargo ships from December 1941 to March 1944. I-26 crippled the aircraft carrier USS Saratoga with one torpedo hit on 31 August 1942, and on 13 November 1942 during the naval battle of Guadalcanal, I-26 scored her most successful kill when she helped to sink the light cruiser USS Juneau, which had been crippled by a torpedo hit from the Japanese destroyer Amatsukaze earlier that morning. I-26 totaled nearly 59,000-tons sunk.
- I-27 sank 11 cargo ships between June 1942 and February 1944, totaling over 70,000-tons sunk.
- I-29 was used to conduct personnel, gold, and technology exchanges with Germany during WW2. Her most famous Yanagi mission was the successful transfer on 26 April 1943 off the coast of Mozambique, Africa, and safe return to Japan from German U-180 with Netaji Subhas Chandra Bose, leader of the Indian Independence Movement and Indian National Army who was going from Berlin to Tokyo, and his Adjutant, Abid Hasan, while two Japanese naval officers sent to study U-boat construction and 2 tons of gold were transferred to U-180 as Japanese payment for German wartime technology. Both submarines returned safely to their bases. Additionally, I-29 sank 7 cargo-ships between September 1942 to July 1943, totaling nearly 45,000 tons sunk.
- I-30 conducted a Yanagi mission in the latter half of 1942, transporting Mica, Shellac, and blueprints for type 91 torpedoes to Lorient, France in August. However, she never made it back to Japan.
- I-36 sank the 419-ton amphibious transport ship LCI-600 with a Kaiten manned torpedo, one of only 3 sinkings scored by the weapon.
- I-37 sank 7 cargo ships between June 1943 and February 1944, totaling nearly 48,000 tons sunk. She committed several atrocities by massacring the civilian crews of the ships she sank.
- I-39 sank the 1,290-ton fleet tug USS Navajo en route from Pago Pago towing a gas barge.

=== Losses ===
- I-15 was sunk off San Cristobol by the destroyer-minesweeper USS Southard on 10 November 1942.
- I-19 was sunk by the destroyer USS Radford 25 November 1943
- I-21 was sunk by Gruman TBF torpedo bombers from the escort carrier USS Chenango on 29 November 1943.
- I-23 was lost to a diving accident in February 1942, following a final report made from off Oahu.
- I-25 was sunk by destroyer USS Patterson on 25 August 1943.
- I-26 was sunk by destroyer escort USS Richard M Rowell during the battle of Leyte Gulf, 26 October 1944.
- I-27 was sunk by British destroyers HMS Paladin and HMS Petard off Addu Atoll on 12 February 1944 after she sank the 7,513-ton British troopship SS Khedive Ismail with the loss of about 1,300 lives. She was first rammed by Paladin then torpedoed by Petard.
- I-28 was sunk by submarine USS Tautog south of Truk on 17 May 1942.
- I-29 was sunk by submarine USS Sawfish in Balintang Channel on 26 July 1944.
- I-30 was the first Japanese submarine to reach Europe under the Yanagi missions, but she was sunk by a mine off Singapore on 13 October 1942.
- I-31 was sunk by destroyers USS Edwards and USS Frazier off Attu on 12 May 1943.
- I-32 was sunk by destroyer escort USS Manlove and the subchaser USS Canastota south of Wotje on 24 March 1944.
- I-33 was lost during sea trials in the Inland Sea on 13 June 1944.
- I-34 was sunk by submarine HMS Taurus off Penang on 13 November 1943.
- I-35 was sunk by destroyers USS Meade and USS Frazier off Tarawa on 23 November 1943.
- I-37 was sunk by destroyer escorts USS Conklin and USS McCoy Reynolds off Leyte on 19 November 1944.
- I-38 was sunk by destroyer USS Nicholas near Yap on 12 November 1944.
- I-39 was sunk by destroyer USS Boyd in the Gilberts on 26 November 1943

Altogether the Type B submarines (B1, B2, and B3 combined) are credited with sinking 56 merchant ships for a total of 372,730 tonnes, about 35% of all merchant shipping sunk by Japanese submarines during the war, alongside sinking one aircraft carrier, one heavy cruiser, one light cruiser, one destroyer, one destroyer escort, and one submarine.

All B1 type submarines were lost during the conflict, except for I-36, which was scuttled off Gotō Islands by the US Navy on 1 April 1946.

== Gallery ==
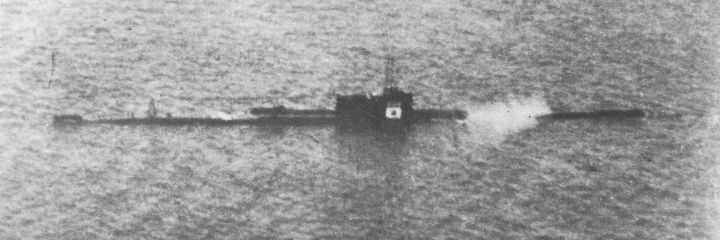
I-15

I-17

I-19

I-21

I-25

I-26

I-27

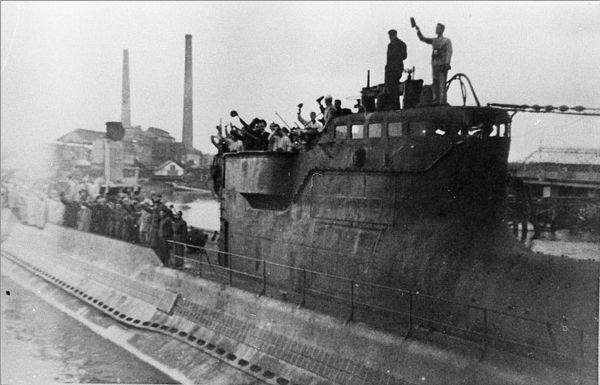
I-29

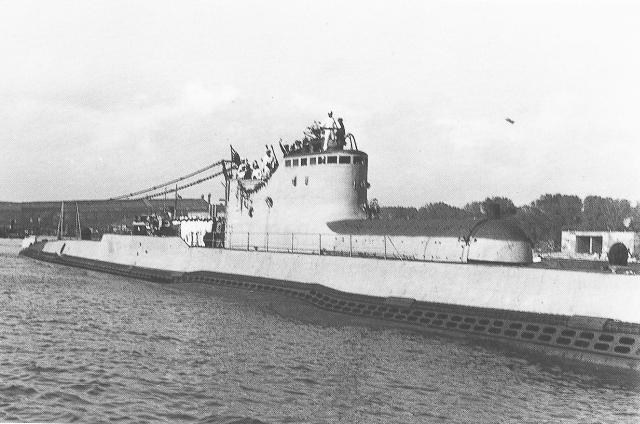
I-30

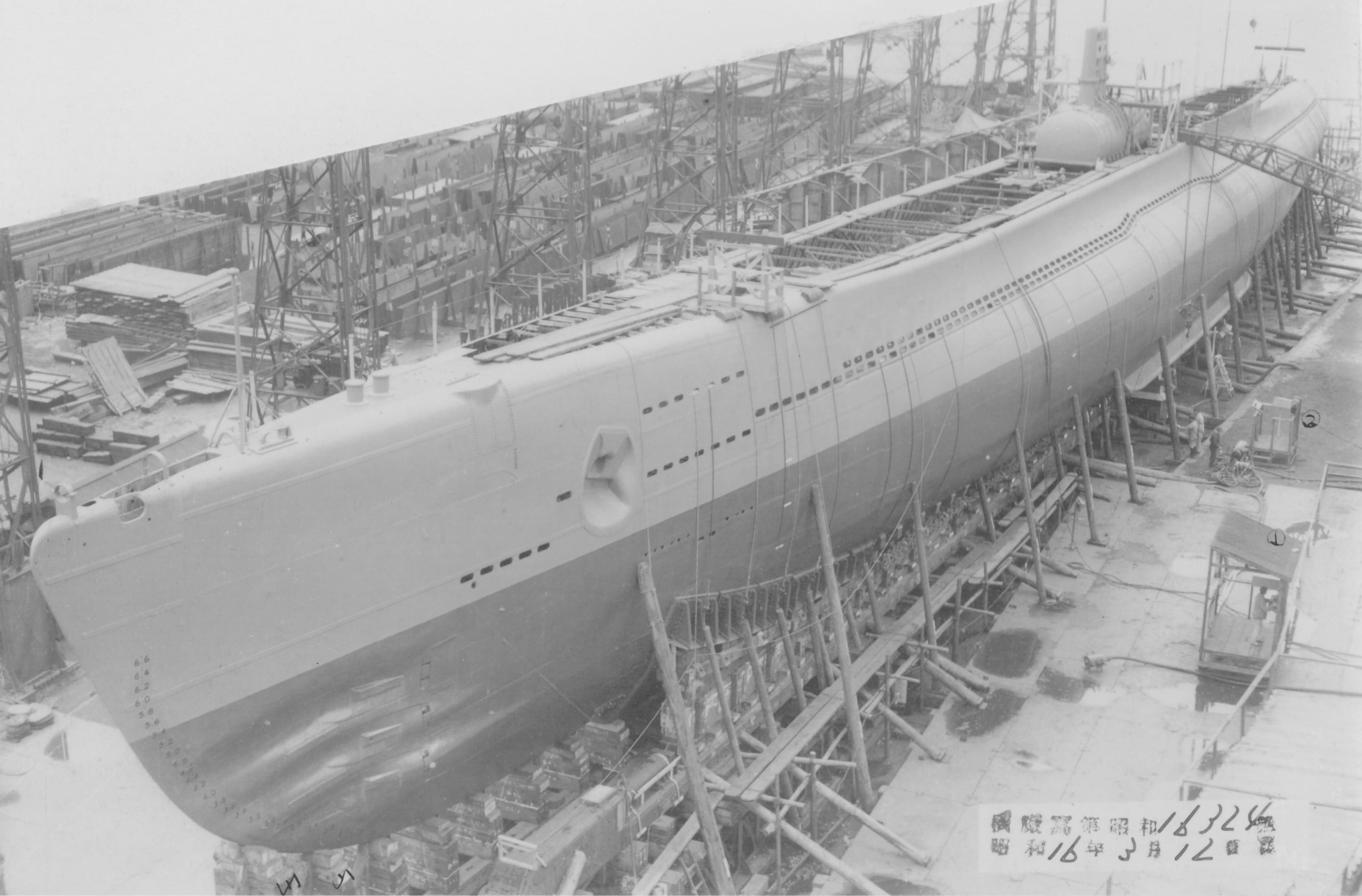
I-31

I-33

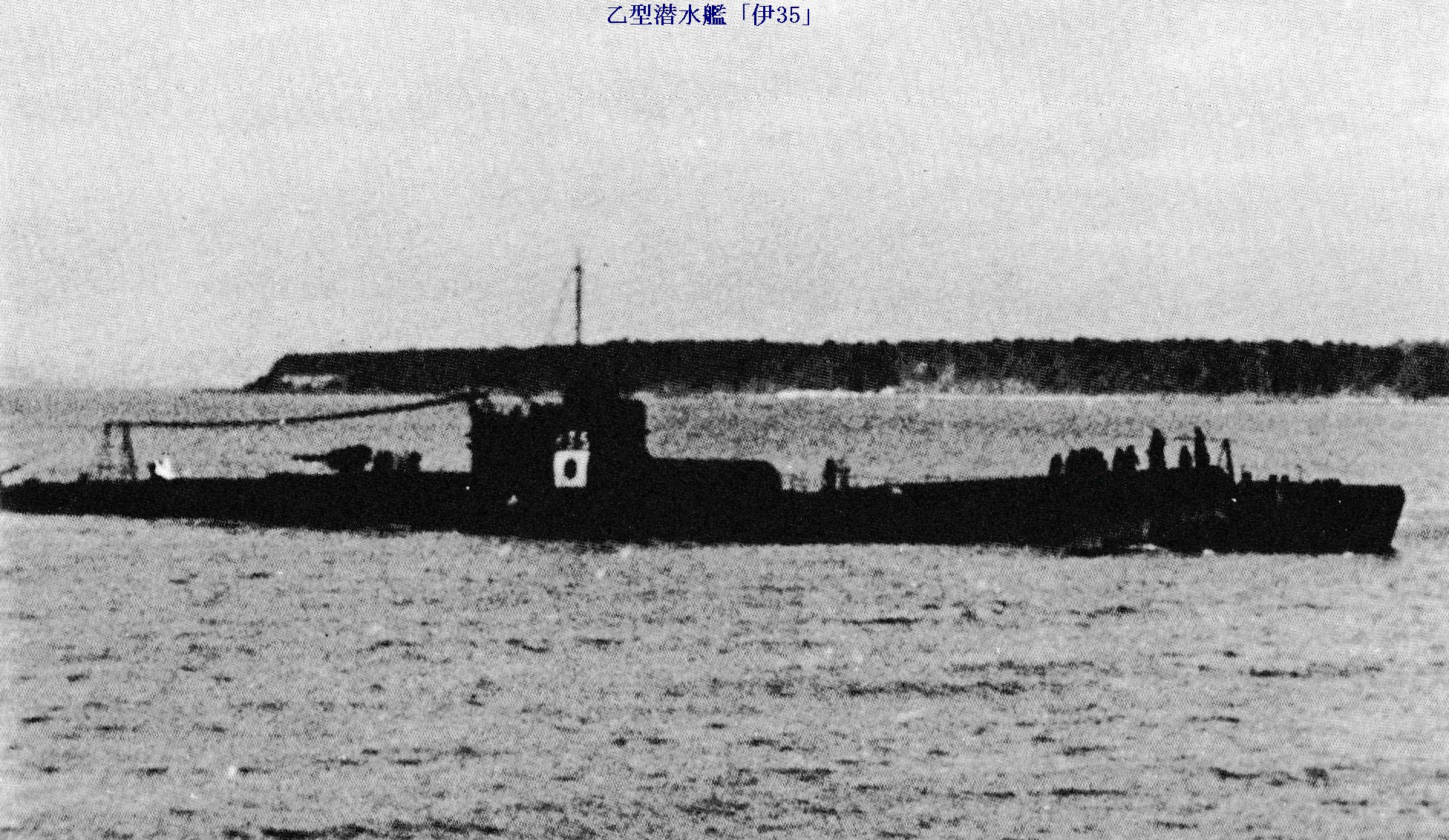
I-35

I-36

I-37

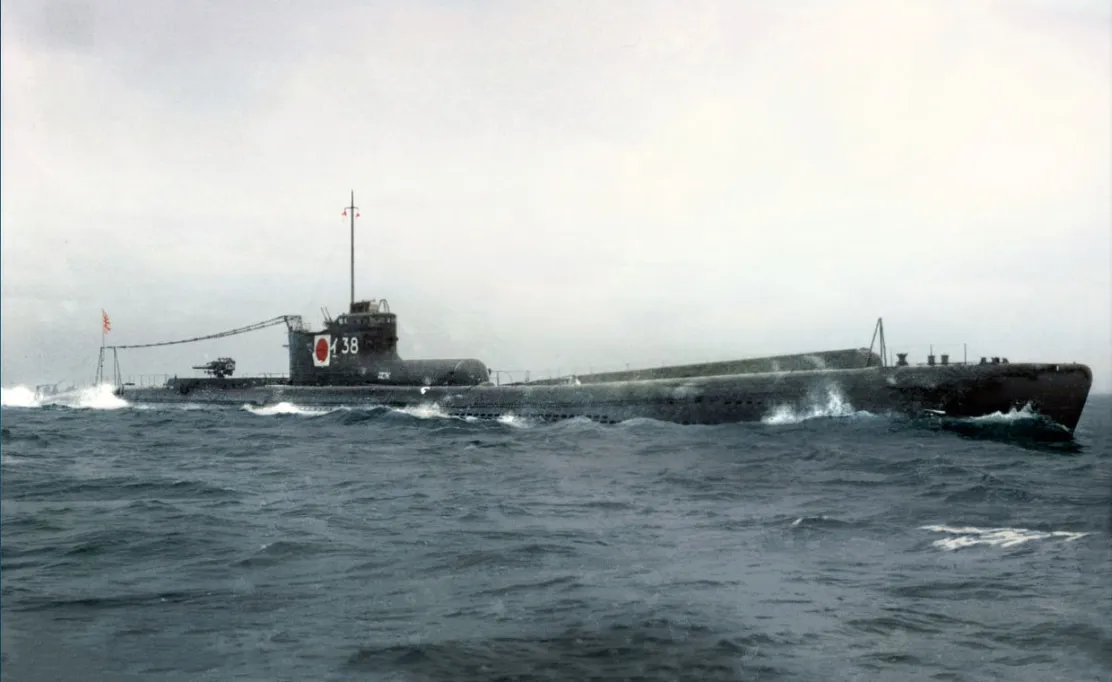
I-38

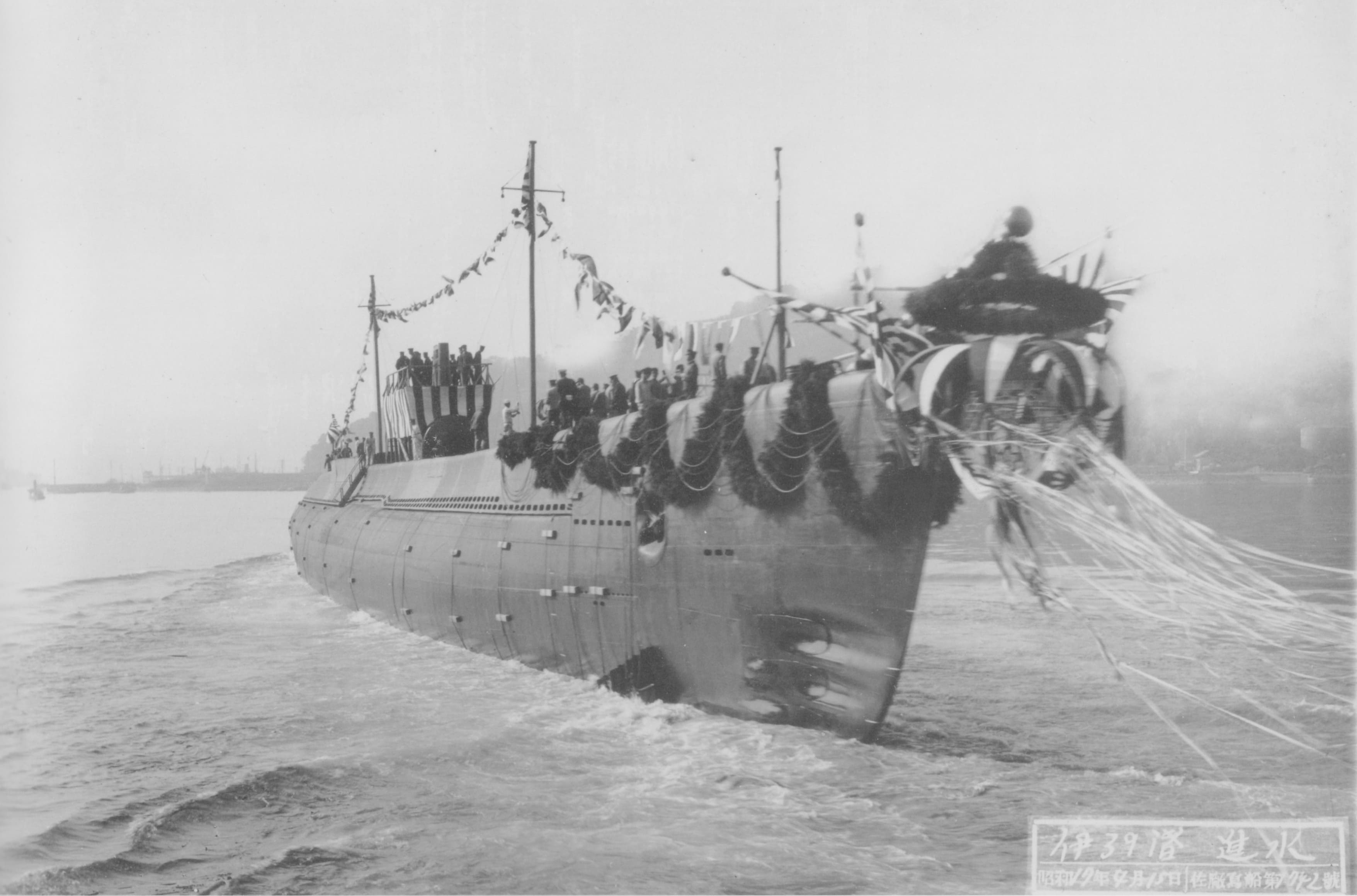
I-39

== See also ==
- Type B submarine
