= Japanese submarine I-9 =

1939 Type A1 submarine

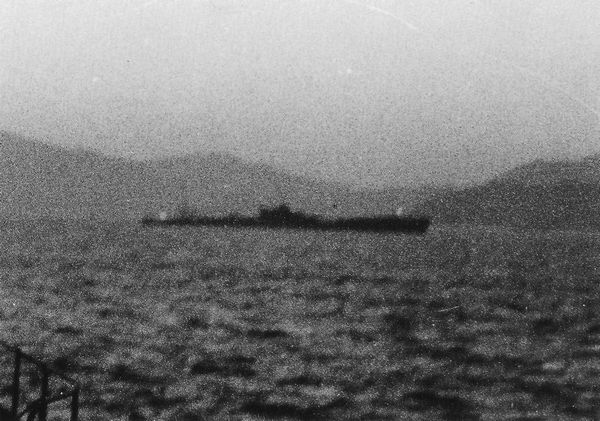
- I-9 undergoing training in Saeki Bay, 20 October 1941

History

Empire of Japan
- Name: I-9
- Builder: Kure Naval Arsenal, Kure
- Laid down: 25 January 1938
- Launched: 20 May 1939
- Commissioned: 13 February 1941
- Fate: Sunk off Kiska, 13 June 1943
- Stricken: 1 August 1943

Service record
- Part of: Yokosuka Naval District; Submarine Squadron 1
- Commanders: Toyojiro Oyama; 13 February 1941 – 31 July 1941; Akiyoshi Fuji; 31 July 1941 – 13 June 1943

General characteristics
- Class & type: Type A1 submarine
- Displacement: 2,966 tonnes (2,919 long tons) surfaced; 4,195 tonnes (4,129 long tons) submerged
- Length: 113.7 m (373 ft 0 in) overall
- Beam: 9.5 m (31 ft 2 in)
- Draft: 5.3 m (17 ft 5 in)
- Installed power: 12,400 bhp (9,200 kW) (diesel); 2,400 hp (1,800 kW) (electric motor)
- Propulsion: Diesel-electric; 1 × diesel engine; 1 × electric motor
- Speed: 23.5 knots (43.5 km/h; 27.0 mph) surfaced; 8 knots (15 km/h; 9.2 mph) submerged
- Range: 16,000 nmi (30,000 km; 18,000 mi) at 16 knots (30 km/h; 18 mph) surfaced; 60 nmi (110 km; 69 mi) at 3 knots (5.6 km/h; 3.5 mph) submerged
- Test depth: 100 m (330 ft)
- Crew: 100
- Armament: 6 × bow 533 mm (21 in) torpedo tubes; 1 × 14 cm (5.5 in) deck gun; 2 × twin 25 mm (1 in) Type 96 anti-aircraft guns
- Aircraft carried: 1 × Yokosuka E14Y seaplane
- Aviation facilities: 1 × catapult

I-9 was an Imperial Japanese Navy Type A1 submarine commissioned in 1941. She saw service during World War II, including operations related to the attack on Pearl Harbor, a patrol off the United States West Coast, and in Operation K. She also took part in the Aleutians campaign and the Guadalcanal campaign before she was sunk in June 1943.

== Design and description ==
Type A1 submarines were versions of the preceding Type J3 with superior range and an improved aircraft installation, and they were fitted as squadron flagships. They displaced 2,966 tonnes (2,919 long tons) on the surface and 4,195 tonnes (4,129 long tons) submerged. The submarines were 113.7 meters (373 ft 0 in) long and had a beam of 9.5 meters (31 ft 2 in) and a draft of 5.3 meters (17 ft 5 in). They had a diving depth of 100 meters (328 ft).

For surface running, Type A1 submarines were powered by two 6,200-brake-horsepower (4,623 kW) diesel engines, each driving one propeller shaft. When submerged each propeller was driven by a 1,200-horsepower (895 kW) electric motor. They could reach 19 knots (35 km/h; 22 mph) on the surface and 8.25 knots (15.28 km/h; 9.49 mph) underwater. On the surface, the Type A1s had a range of 16,000 nautical miles (29,600 km; 18,400 mi) at 16 knots (30 km/h; 18 mph); submerged, they had a range of 90 nmi (170 km; 100 mi) at 3 knots (5.6 km/h; 3.5 mph).

Type A1 submarines were armed with four internal bow 53.3 cm (21.0 in) torpedo tubes and carried a total of 18 torpedoes. They were also armed with a single 140 mm (5.5 in)/40 deck gun and two twin 25 mm (1 in) Type 96 anti-aircraft guns.

Unlike on the Type J3 submarines, the aircraft hangar was integrated into the conning tower and faced forward, and the aircraft catapult was forward of the hangar, while the deck gun was aft of the conning tower. Reversing the locations of the deck gun and catapult allowed aircraft launching from a Type A1 submarine to use the forward motion of the submarine to supplement the speed imparted by the catapult.

== Construction and commissioning ==
Built by the Kure Naval Arsenal at Kure, Japan, I-9 was laid down on 25 January 1938. She was launched on 20 May 1939 and was completed and commissioned on 13 February 1941.

== Service history ==
=== Pre-World War II ===
Upon commissioning, I-9 was attached to the Yokosuka Naval District, with Commander Toyojiro Oyama in command. He was relieved by Commander (captain from June 1943) Akiyoshi Fuji in July 1941, who commanded the submarine for the rest of her career. As Japan prepared for the upcoming attack on Pearl Harbor, which would bring Japan and the United States into World War II, I-9 was assigned to the Advance Expeditionary Force in the 6th Fleet in November 1941 to serve as the flagship of Submarine Squadron 1 under the command of Rear Admiral Tsutomu Sato.

As the Imperial Japanese Navy began to deploy for the upcoming conflict in the Pacific, I-9 departed Yokosuka, Japan, with Rear Admiral Sato and a Watanabe E9W1 (Allied reporting name "Slim") reconnaissance seaplane embarked, in company with the submarines I-15, I-17, and I-25, bound for the waters of the Hawaiian Islands to participate in Operation Z, the Pearl Harbor attack. While the submarines were en route, they received the message "Climb Mount Niitaka 1208" (Japanese: Niitakayama nobore 1208) from the Combined Fleet on 2 December 1941, indicating that war with the Allies would commence on 8 December 1941 Japan time, which was on 7 December 1941 on the other side of the International Date Line in Hawaii.

=== World War II ===
==== First war patrol: Pearl Harbor and U.S. West Coast ====
On 7 December 1941, the day of the Pearl Harbor attack, I-9 was on patrol north of Oahu with orders to reconnoiter Hawaiian waters and attack any American ships that sortied from Pearl Harbor. On 11 December 1941, she battle-surfaced 700 nautical miles (1,296 km; 806 mi) northeast of Oahu on the starboard quarter of the unarmed Matson Line steamer SS Lahaina — returning to Hawaii with a cargo of 745 short tons (676 t; 665 long tons) of molasses and 300 short tons (270 t; 270 long tons) of scrap iron after the outbreak of war — and fired a warning shot. Lahaina′s crew transmitted an SOS and abandoned ship, after which I-9 fired 25 140-millimeter (5.5 in) rounds, scoring eight hits on Lahaina′s starboard side and four on her port side and setting Lahaina′s superstructure on fire before departing the area. On the morning of 12 December, Lahaina′s crew attempted to reboard her, but found that fires and flooding aboard her were out of control, and after suffering an explosion, Lahaina capsized to port and sank at around 12:30 at 27°42′N 147°38′W. After two crew members died of exposure and two others committed suicide, Lahaina′s 30 survivors reached Kahului, Maui, on 21 December 1941.

On 13 December 1941, Japanese Imperial General Headquarters ordered the submarines of the 6th Fleet to bombard the United States West Coast. The 6th Fleet's commander, Vice Admiral Mitsumi Shimizu, in turn ordered I-9 and the submarines I-10, I-15, I-17, I-19, I-21, I-23, I-25, and I-26 each to fire 30 rounds at targets on the U.S. West Coast on the evening of 25 December 1941, with Rear Admiral Sato aboard I-9 in overall command of the bombardment. I-9 arrived in her patrol area off Cape Blanco, Oregon, on 19 December 1941. On 22 December 1941 the commander-in-chief of the Combined Fleet, Admiral Isoroku Yamamoto, postponed the bombardment until 27 December, and on 22 December I-9 departed her patrol area to make for the Guadalupe Island area off the west coast of Mexico′s Baja California Peninsula. On 27 December 1941, Sato cancelled the bombardment because most of the submarines tasked with carrying it out were low on fuel, and I-9 headed for Kwajalein in the Marshall Islands, which she reached on 1 January 1942.

==== Second war patrol and Operation K-1 ====
On 1 February 1942, planes from the United States Navy aircraft carrier USS Enterprise raided Kwajalein, and two hours later 6th Fleet Headquarters ordered Submarine Squadron 1, including I-9, to put to sea to find and attack Enterprise. I-9 got underway from Kwajalein later the same day to begin her second war patrol, carrying a Watanabe E9W1 (Allied reporting name "Slim") floatplane. During her patrol, she was selected on 5 February 1942 to participate in Operation K-1, an attack on Pearl Harbor in which two Imperial Japanese Navy Kawanishi H8K (Allied reporting name "Emily") flying boats were to fly from Wotje Atoll in the Marshall Islands to the French Frigate Shoals in the Northwestern Hawaiian Islands, refuel from the submarines I-15, I-19, and I-26 there, and then fly on to attack Pearl Harbor 500 nautical miles (930 km; 580 mi) to the east-southeast. The submarine I-23 was to patrol south of Hawaii to provide weather reports and an air-sea rescue capability if either or both of the flying boats were forced down, and I-9 was to operate in an area halfway between Wotje Atoll and the French Frigate Shoals to transmit a radio beacon signal to help the flying boats navigate during the first leg of their flight.

I-9 arrived in an operating area 200 nautical miles (370 km; 230 mi) south of Hawaii on 7 February 1942, and on 23 February launched her E9W1 floatplane for a reconnaissance flight over Pearl Harbor. Its crew could not identify any ships in the harbor because of poor visibility and returned to I-9; during the recovery of their aircraft, both of its wings suffered damage. On 28 February 1942, I-9 proceeded to her operating area for Operation K-1, which she reached on 1 March, providing a communications relay and radio beacon service at 19°00′N 174°20′W, which the Japanese designated "Point M." The two H8Ks flew to the French Frigate Shoals on 4 March 1942, and after refueling there dropped eight 250-kilogram (551 lb) bombs through overcast over Honolulu on 5 March, inflicting little damage and no casualties, before flying back to the Marshall Islands. I-9 subsequently returned to Japan, arriving at Yokosuka on 21 March 1942.

==== Third war patrol ====
After embarking a Yokosuka E14Y1 (Allied reporting name "Glen") floatplane, I-9 departed Yokosuka on 15 May 1942, assigned to support Operation AL, the invasion of the western Aleutian Islands that began the Aleutian Islands campaign. She called at Ōminato, Japan, from 17 to 19 May 1942, then got back underway. She was reassigned to the Northern District Force on 20 May 1942, and on 21 May Submarine Squadron 1 (I-9, I-15, I-17, I-19, I-25, and I-26) received orders to conduct a pre-invasion reconnaissance of the Aleutians. At dawn on 24 May, I-9′s floatplane reconnoitered Kiska and Amchitka, and its pilot recommended Reynard Cove on Kiska as the best place for an amphibious landing and reported that previous reports of an airfield on Amchitka were erroneous. In another reconnaissance flight at around 05:00 on 26 May, the floatplane scouted Adak Island and Kanaga Island, its pilot reporting that he saw eight bivouacs and other, similar buildings on Adak.

On 29 May 1942, I-9 provided distant cover for a Japanese force centered around the aircraft carriers Jun'yō and Ryūjō as it approached the Aleutians. After Japanese forces occupied Attu Island against no opposition on 5 June 1942, I-9 joined a submarine patrol line off the Aleutians. On 7 June, the Japanese occupied Kiska without opposition, and on 8 June the Japanese submarine patrol line moved to the Kodiak Island area. On 15 June 1942, I-9′s floatplane flew a reconnaissance flight over Naval Air Station Kodiak, and the same day I-9 herself unsuccessfully attacked two merchant ships near Kodiak Island. On 19 June 1942, she attacked the United States Army Transport USAT General W. C. Gorgas with gunfire in the Gulf of Alaska at 56°17′N 146°46′W, damaging her. Reassigned to the Advance Force on 30 June 1942, she departed her operating area and made for Yokosuka, which she reached on 7 July 1942.

==== Fourth war patrol ====
Assigned to take part in the Guadalcanal campaign, which began with United States Marine Corps landings on Guadalcanal in the Solomon Islands on 7 August 1942, I-9 — with the commander of Submarine Squadron 1, Rear Admiral Shigeaki Yamazaki, embarked — got underway from Yokosuka on 15 August 1942 in company with the submarines I-15, I-17, I-19, and I-26. She joined submarine patrol line A off San Cristóbal in the southeastern Solomons on 23 August.

The Battle of the Eastern Solomons began on 24 August 1942. While screening U.S. Navy Task Force 11 as the battle continued on 25 August, the destroyer USS Grayson at 11:43 sighted what she first identified as the superstructure of an aircraft carrier 12 nautical miles (22 km; 14 mi) to the west-southwest, but two minutes after detaching from the task force to investigate she correctly identified it as the conning tower of a submerging submarine. It was I-9, which avoided Grayson's first depth-charge attack at 12:23 by turning inside Grayson's turning radius. Grayson regained contact and dropped another set of depth charges, but I-9 avoided them with a hard turn at full speed at a depth of 200 feet (61 m). A Douglas SBD Dauntless dive bomber from the aircraft carrier USS Wasp arrived overhead and harassed I-9 with a dummy attack. Grayson made a third depth-charge attack after 13:29, and I-9 headed due west at 4 knots (7.4 km/h; 4.6 mph) and broke contact with Grayson. Grayson regained contact at 13:47 and made a fourth attack, but I-9 avoided the depth charges by turning to the west-southwest at 7 knots (13 km/h; 8.1 mph). After the destroyer USS Patterson appeared on the scene, Grayson dropped the last of her depth charges in a fifth attack which rocked I-9 with nearby explosions, slowing her to 4 knots (7.4 km/h; 4.6 mph), knocking out her internal lighting and aft bilge pump, causing a leak in one of her forward fuel tanks, and dropping her to a depth of 440 feet (134 m).

Patterson began her first attack run against I-9 at 14:18, but she failed to detect the submarine because of the turbulence created by Grayson's final depth-charge attack. After the destroyer USS Monssen arrived to assist at 14:38, Patterson established sonar contact on I-9 at 14:40 and a few minutes later her lookouts reported sighting a surfacing submarine, which the Dauntless marked with a smoke float. Patterson and Monssen each made a depth-charge attack, after which a large air bubble and an oil slick appeared on the surface, prompting the destroyers to depart the area and claim a kill.

I-9 had survived, however, and two hours after the final depth-charge attack she surfaced. Her crew inspected her and found additional damage in the form of two inoperable periscopes and a temporarily knocked-out radio transmitter. After Rear Admiral Yamazaki reported I-9′s condition, I-9 received orders to proceed to the Japanese base at Truk Atoll, which she reached on 30 August 1942.

==== Fifth war patrol ====
After the completion of repairs by the repair ship Urakami Maru, I-9 departed Truk to begin her fifth war patrol on 8 September 1942, headed for a patrol area southeast of Guadalcanal. She was assigned to the 2nd Patrol Unit on 15 September 1942 and that day sighted several Allied transports. On 23 September, she briefly pursued an Allied transport escorted by a destroyer. She departed her patrol area on 1 October 1942 and returned to Truk on 6 October.

==== Sixth war patrol ====
After the staff of Submarine Squadron 1 transferred ashore at Truk on 13 October 1942, I-9 began her sixth war patrol on 16 October with a Yokosuka E14Y1 (Allied reporting name "Glen") aboard, assigned a patrol area southeast of the Solomon Islands. She had been reassigned to the B Patrol Unit by 31 October 1942, when she received orders to reconnoiter Nouméa on the coast of Grande Terre in New Caledonia. Her floatplane flew a reconnaissance mission over the airfield and harbor at Nouméa, reporting an aircraft carrier, three cruisers, and a number of smaller ships in the harbor.

On 7 November 1942, I-9 detached from the B Patrol Unit to conduct a reconnaissance flight over Espiritu Santo in the New Hebrides. She received orders on 11 November to proceed to the anchorage at Shortland Island in the Shortland Islands after completing the flight. Her floatplane flew over Espiritu Santo on 12 November, but dense cloud cover prevented its crew from sighting any ships. She then made for the Shortland anchorage, which she reached on 19 November 1942.

==== Guadalcanal supply runs ====
While I-9 was still at sea, the commander of the 6th Fleet, Vice Admiral Teruhisa Komatsu, addressed a meeting of the commanding officers of his fleet's submarines on 16 November 1942 to inform them that the commander-in-chief of the Combined Fleet, Admiral Isoroku Yamamoto, had ordered the 6th Fleet to organize a system of supply runs to the Imperial Japanese Army's 17th Army forces fighting on Guadalcanal. Selected to participate in the supply operation, I-9 loaded cargo after arriving at the Shortland anchorage, and on 24 November 1942 set out for Guadalcanal with a cargo of 32 tons of ammunition and food. She arrived at Kamimbo on the northwest coast of Guadalcanal and unloaded her cargo on 26 November, then departed for Truk, where she arrived on 1 December 1942.

In late December 1942, I-9 got back underway, departing Truk for the Shortland anchorage, where she called from 2 to 4 January 1943 to load 21 tons of food in rubber containers. She then proceeded to Guadalcanal on her second supply run, where she unloaded the containers at Kamimbo on 6 January 1943. She then returned to Shortland, where she arrived on 8 January. She departed on 10 January for her third supply run, but was forced to abandon her plans to unload her cargo when she arrived off Guadalcanal on 12 January 1943 to find the Kamimbo area patrolled by Allied motor torpedo boats.

I-9's fourth supply run also was unsuccessful: She departed Shortland on 16 January 1943 intending to release her supply drums underwater, but found she could not release them when she arrived off Kamimbo on 18 January. She returned to the Shortland anchorage on 20 January. She got back underway on 22 January 1943 for her fifth supply run carrying 18 tons of cargo in 120 supply drums and unloaded 80 of the drums at Kamimbo on 25 January 1943 before Allied motor torpedo boats drove her off. She returned to Shortland on 27 January 1943. Her sixth supply run began on 28 January 1943 with her departure from Shortland and she succeeded in releasing all of her supply drums off Kamimbo on 30 January, but Allied motor torpedo boats arrived on the scene and sank all of the drums before Japanese forces ashore could recover them. She reached the Shortland anchorage on 1 February 1943. In Operation Ke, the Japanese evacuated their forces from Guadalcanal, completing the operation on 8 February 1943.

==== February–May 1943 ====
While Operation Ke was underway, I-9 departed the Shortland anchorage on 1 February 1943, called at Truk on 4 and 5 February, and then proceeded to Yokosuka, which she reached on 12 February 1943. On 20 February, she moved to Kobe, Japan, where she entered the Kawasaki shipyard for repairs. While I-9 was at Kobe, the U.S. Navy submarine USS Tunny attacked a Japanese submarine off Truk that she misidentified as I-9; the submarine she attacked probably was I-16.

==== Aleutian Islands 1943 ====
On 11 May 1943, the Battle of Attu began when the United States Army's 7th Infantry Division landed on Attu in the Aleutian Islands, and on 12 May 1943 I-9 was reassigned to the Northern District Force. With her repairs complete, she called at Kure from 12 to 13 May before arriving at Yokosuka on 16 May 1943. During her stay at Kure, with the situation on Attu deteriorating for the Japanese, Imperial General Headquarters on 21 May decided to evacuate the Japanese garrison on Kiska. I-9 departed Yokosuka on 23 May bound for Paramushiro in the Kurile Islands.

After calling at Paramushiro from 27 to 29 May 1943, I-9 set out for Kiska with a cargo of 17 tons of ammunition and two tons of food. During her voyage, a destroyer chased her for three hours on 1 June in the Bering Sea off Agattu, but she arrived safely at Kiska on 2 June 1943. She unloaded her cargo, embarked 55 Imperial Japanese Navy personnel, 10 Imperial Japanese Army soldiers, and 10 civilian construction workers, and departed the same day for Paramushiro, where she arrived on 8 June 1943.

On 10 June 1943, I-9 got underway from Paramushiro for her second Kiska supply run, with orders to evacuate the personnel of the Kiska midget submarine base. The Japanese never heard from her again.

==== Loss ====
At 17:58 on 13 June 1943, the U.S. Navy destroyer USS Frazier was off the coast of Kiska 15 nautical miles (28 km; 17 mi) off Sirius Point when she detected I-9 on the surface on radar in dense fog at a range of 6,900 yards (6,310 m). She headed toward the contact at 20 knots (37 km/h; 23 mph), and gained sonar contact on I-9. One of Frazier′s lookouts sighted a periscope at a range of 100 yards (91 m) at 20:09. Frazier opened fire, scoring one hit on the periscope, then made a depth-charge attack, after which air bubbles, oil, and debris came to the surface. Frazier then conducted two more depth-charge attacks to ensure the submarine's destruction. It was the end of I-9, lost with all hands northwest of Kiska at 52°08′N 177°03′E.

On 15 June 1943, the Japanese declared I-9 to be presumed lost off Kiska with all 101 hands. She was stricken from the navy list on 1 August 1943.

After World War II, Samuel Eliot Morison′s History of United States Naval Operations in World War II incorrectly identified the submarine Frazier sank on 13 June 1943 off Kiska as I-31, but Frazier sank I-31 on 12 May 1943 off Attu. The Dictionary of American Naval Fighting Ships, meanwhile, asserts that Frazier attacked two different contacts off Kiska on 10–11 June 1943, not on 13 June 1943, and was unable to determine the results of her attacks.
