= Japanese submarine I-33 =

Type B1 submarine

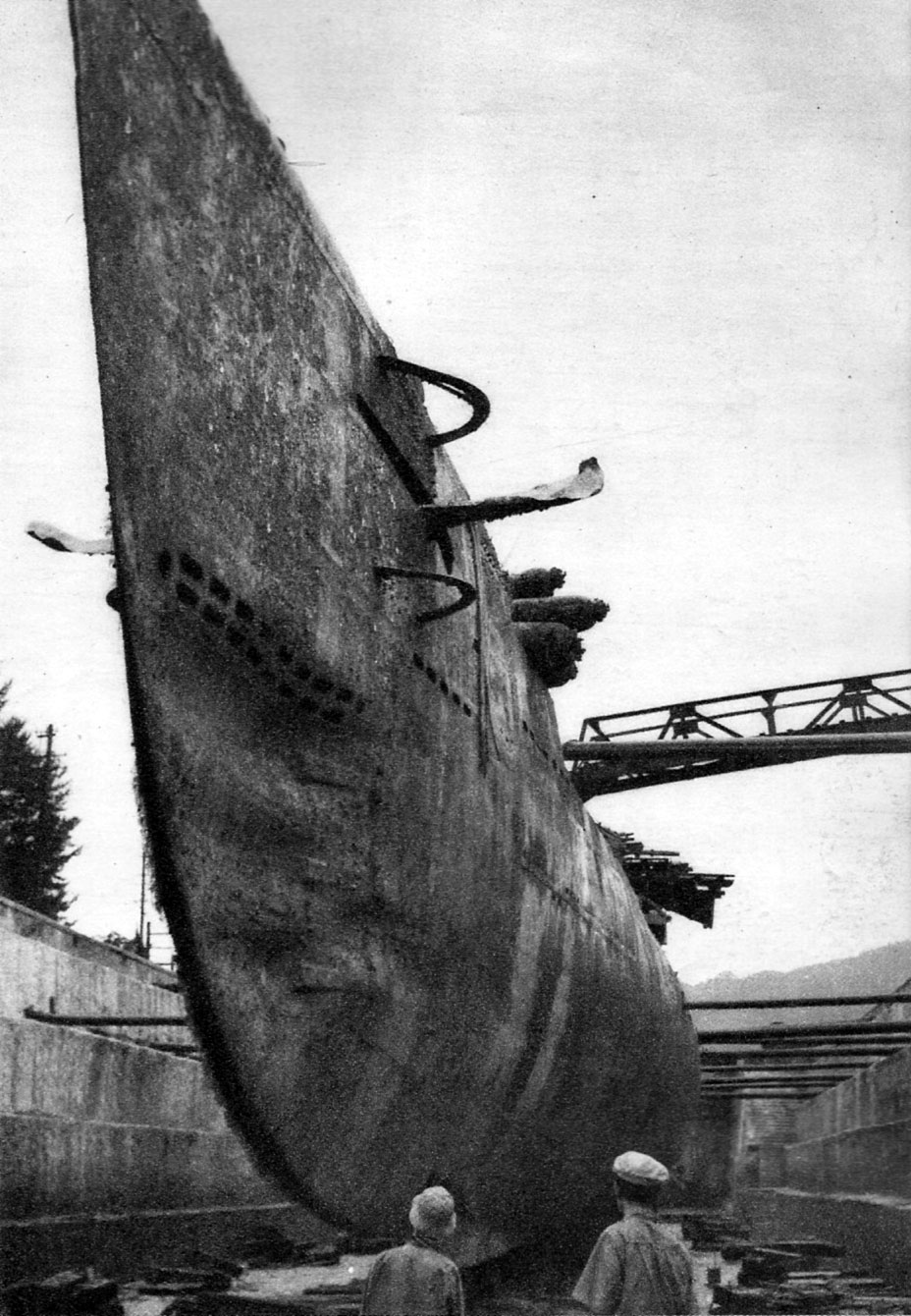
- The salvaged wreck of I-33 on 30 August 1953.

History

Japan
- Name: Submarine No. 146
- Builder: Mitsubishi
- Laid down: 21 February 1940
- Renamed: I-41 on 25 March 1941
- Launched: 1 May 1941
- Renamed: I-33 on 1 November 1941
- Completed: 10 June 1942
- Commissioned: 10 June 1942
- Fate: Sank 26 September 1942; Refloated 29 December 1942; Repairs completed 1 June 1944; Sank during post-repair trials 13 June 1944; Stricken 10 August 1944; Refloated July–August 1953; Scrapped

General characteristics
- Class & type: Type B1 submarine
- Displacement: 2,584 tons surfaced; 3,654 tons submerged
- Length: 108.7 m (357 ft)
- Beam: 9.3 m (31 ft)
- Draft: 5.14 m (16.9 ft)
- Propulsion: 2 diesels: 12,400 hp (9,200 kW); Electric motors: 2,000 hp (1,500 kW)
- Speed: 23.5 knots (43.5 km/h) surfaced; 8 knots (15 km/h) submerged
- Range: 14,000 nautical miles (26,000 km) at 16 knots (30 km/h)
- Test depth: 100 m (330 ft)
- Complement: 94
- Armament: 6 × 533 mm (21 in) forward torpedo tubes; 17 torpedoes; 1 × 14 cm/40 11th Year Type naval gun
- Aircraft carried: 1 Yokosuka E14Y seaplane

I-33 was an Imperial Japanese Navy B1 type submarine. Completed and commissioned in 1942, she served in World War II, making one war patrol that included the Battle of the Eastern Solomons, before sinking accidentally in September 1942. Refloated and repaired, she sank again in a diving accident during post-repair sea trials in June 1944.

== Construction and commissioning ==
I-33 was laid down on 21 February 1940 by Mitsubishi with the name Submarine No. 152. Renamed I-41 on 25 March 1941, she was launched on 1 May 1941. Renamed I-33 on 1 November 1941, she was completed and commissioned on 10 June 1942.

== Service history ==
Upon commissioning, I-33 was attached to the Kure Naval District and assigned to Submarine Division 15 in Submarine Squadron 1 along with the submarines I-31 and I-32.

=== First war patrol ===
The Guadalcanal campaign began on 7 August 1942 with U.S. amphibious landings on Guadalcanal, Tulagi, Florida Island, Gavutu, and Tanambogo in the southeastern Solomon Islands. I-33 got underway from Kure on 15 August 1942 bound for a war patrol in the Solomons area, where she took up a position as part of submarine picket line south of San Cristobal. The two-day Battle of the Eastern Solomons began on 24 August 1942, and she was on the surface that day heading for a new position when a United States Navy SBD-3 Dauntless dive bomber from the aircraft carrier USS Enterprise (CV-6) attacked her at 11:05 at 09°21′S 163°35′E, but she crash-dived and avoided damage.

On 26 August 1942, the commander of the Advance Force ordered I-33 and the submarines I-11, I-15, I-17, I-19, I-26, I-174, and I-175 to deploy to the south and east of San Cristobal to interdict American supplies and reinforcements bound for Guadalcanal. At around midnight on 28 August, I-15 sighted what she identified as an American aircraft carrier east of San Cristobal heading south. I-15, I-17, and I-33 received orders to pursue the aircraft carrier, but failed to make contact with it. I-33 sighted a U.S. task force on 30 August 1942 but was unable to get into a position to attack it.

On 10 September 1942, I-15, I-17, I-19, I-33, and the submarines I-9, I-21, I-24, and I-26 took up patrol stations between Ndeni in the Santa Cruz Islands and San Cristobal. At 0930 on 13 September, an Imperial Japanese Navy Kawanishi H8K (Allied reporting name "Emily") flying boat reported an Allied task force 345 nautical miles (639 km; 397 mi) south-southeast of Tulagi, and I-9, I-15, I-17, I-21, I-24, I-26, I-33, and the submarine I-31 received orders to form a patrol line in the area in an attempt to intercept it. I-33 departed her patrol area on 20 September 1942 bound for Truk, which she reached on 25 September 1942.

=== Sinking at Truk ===
On 26 September 1942, I-33 was at Truk tied up alongside the 6th Fleet repair ship Urakami Maru with her stern moored to a wharf on Dublon. Half of her crew was ashore on leave, her commanding officer was aboard Urakami Maru, and her navigation officer was the senior officer on board. Early in the morning, I-33 crew members and three engineers from Urakami Maru began repairs to I-33′s No. 6 torpedo tube, one of the lowermost tubes. At 09:21 the navigation officer allowed the crew to open the drain cock of the aft main ballast tank in an attempt to make the repairs easier by reducing the effect of swells in the lagoon on I-33 and by raising her bow. This so badly compromised the partially flooded I-33′s buoyancy that the hawsers securing her stern to the wharf broke, her forward torpedo hatch flooded, and she sank in two minutes with the loss of 33 members of her crew.

A rescue operation began immediately. A diver found I-33 on the bottom in 120 feet (37 m) of water and reported that some crewmen were still alive aboard the submarine. Lacking the equipment necessary to try to save the crew, the 6th Fleet abandoned rescue attempts on 27 September 1942, and an investigation of the sinking began that day.

=== Salvage and repair ===
On 30 September 1942, the Ministry of the Navy ordered the salvage of I-33, and, without proper equipment available at Truk, the Combined Fleet passed this order to the 4th Fleet on 2 October 1942. Eventually, a salvage attempt began and on 19 December 1942 I-33′s hull was pressurized and her bow came to the surface, but three minutes later the pressure blew a hatch open and she sank again. The submarine rescue ship Mie Maru and tanker Nippo Maru began another salvage attempt on 25 December 1942 and this time succeeded, refloating I-33 on 29 December 1942.

Nippo Maru departed Truk with I-33 under tow on 2 March 1943 bound for Japan. During the voyage, the auxiliary gunboats Chou Maru and Heijo Maru joined them, and on 9 March 1943 the destroyer Yūnagi also joined the convoy. On 17 March 1943, the ships reached Saeki, Japan, and I-33 arrived at Kure on 18 March 1943 to undergo repairs at the Kure Naval Arsenal.

On 1 April 1944, I-33 was assigned to the Kure Guard Unit. Work on her — including the installation of radar and a radar detector — continued until early May 1944. I-33′s repairs were declared officially complete on 1 June 1944, and she was assigned to Submarine Squadron 11 in the 6th Fleet that day for work-ups.

=== Loss ===
I-33 got underway from Kure at 07:00 on 13 June 1944 to complete her acceptance trials by making a series of dives in the Iyo-nada in the Seto Inland Sea. When she conducted her second crash-dive of the morning at 08:40, her starboard main induction valve did not close, and all compartments aft of her control room flooded. Her crew managed to blow her main ballast tanks partially, and 10 minutes after submerging her bow broke the surface. Flooding continued, however, and a few seconds later she sank, settling on the bottom at a depth of 180 feet (55 m).

I-33′s commanding officer and nine other men were trapped in the control room. With water rising in the control room, the commanding officer decided to remain aboard the submarine and drown, but he ordered the men with him to escape via the conning tower. Eight reached the surface, where they drifted apart in two groups that made for shore separately. Most became exhausted and drowned, only two of them reaching shore alive. Thirteen other men were trapped in the forward crew compartment. The lower hatch of the escape trunk jammed, preventing them from escaping. After 12 of the men suffocated, the last surviving sailor committed suicide. In all, 102 men lost their lives.

A few hours after I-33 sank, fishermen found the two men from the control room who had made it to shore alive and took them to Mitohama, where they contacted naval authorities. The submarine tender Chōgei soon arrived, picked up I-33′s two survivors, and headed for the scene of the disaster.

On 14 June 1944, search aircraft found a diesel oil slick in the Iyo-nada and guided Chōgei to it. Divers from Chōgei found the wreck of I-33 on 15 June 1944 and brought the bodies of two men found entangled in the bridge enclosure to the surface. The divers also determined the cause of the disaster, finding a piece of wooden scaffolding 2 inches (5.1 cm) in diameter which had slipped into the air-induction line during the repairs at Kure and jammed the valve, causing disastrous flooding.

A salvage barge equipped with a crane arrived on the scene on 16 June 1944, but an approaching typhoon forced the Japanese to abandon all rescue and salvage efforts that evening. No inquiry into the sinking took place because most of the officers assigned to the investigation were killed in action during fighting in the Mariana Islands in the summer of 1944. The Imperial Japanese Navy struck I-33 from the Navy list on 10 August 1944.

== Final disposition ==
After I-33 had lain on the bottom of the Seto Inland Sea for nine years, the Hokusei Sempaku salvage firm began work to refloat her in June 1953. Her wreck was refloated between 23 July and 18 August 1953, the salvors discovering that her forward compartments were not flooded. The wreck was scrapped at the Hitachi yard at Innoshima, Japan.

The salvaged wreck of I-33 on 30 September 1953
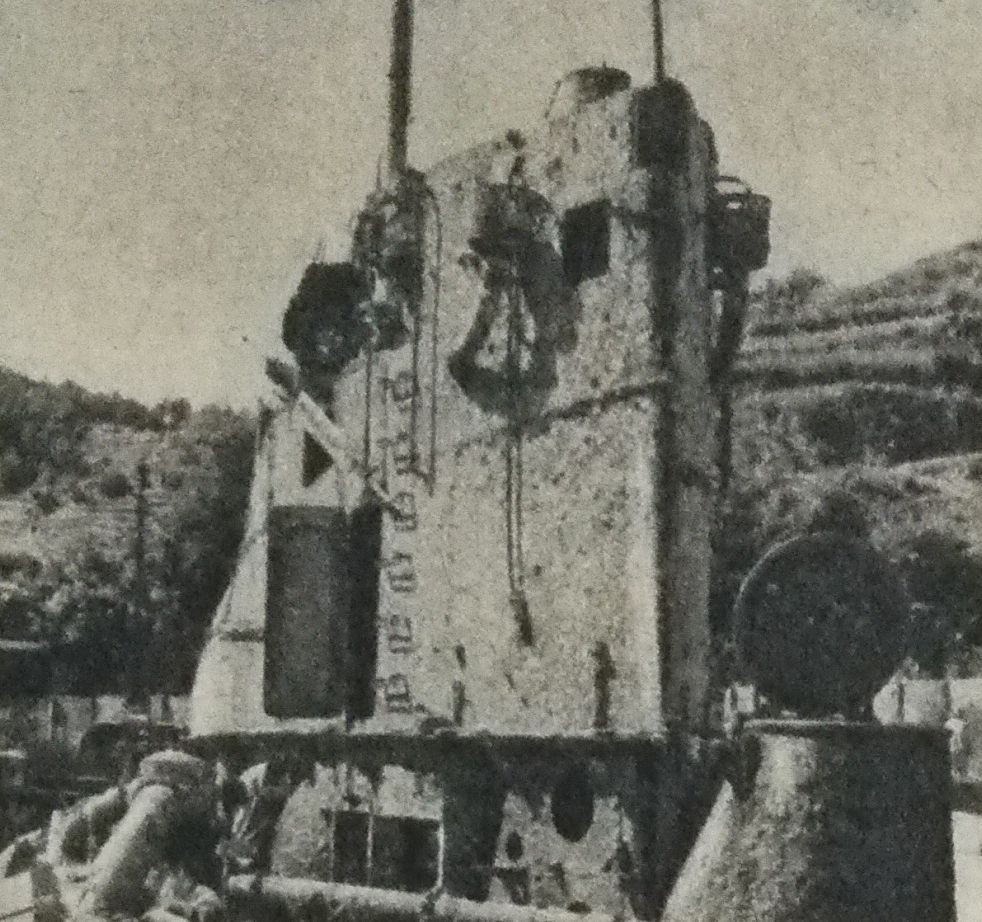
Conning tower

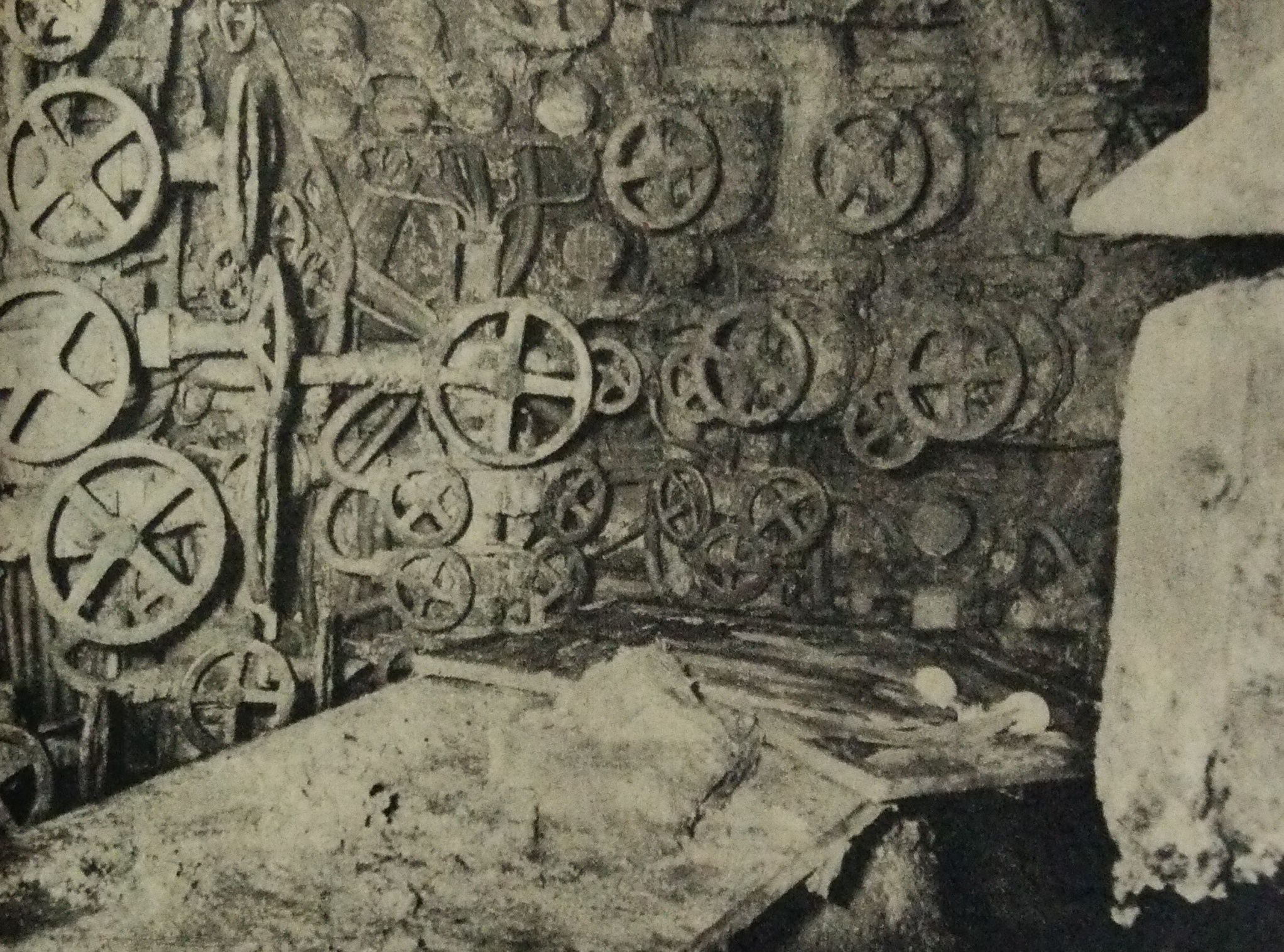
Control room

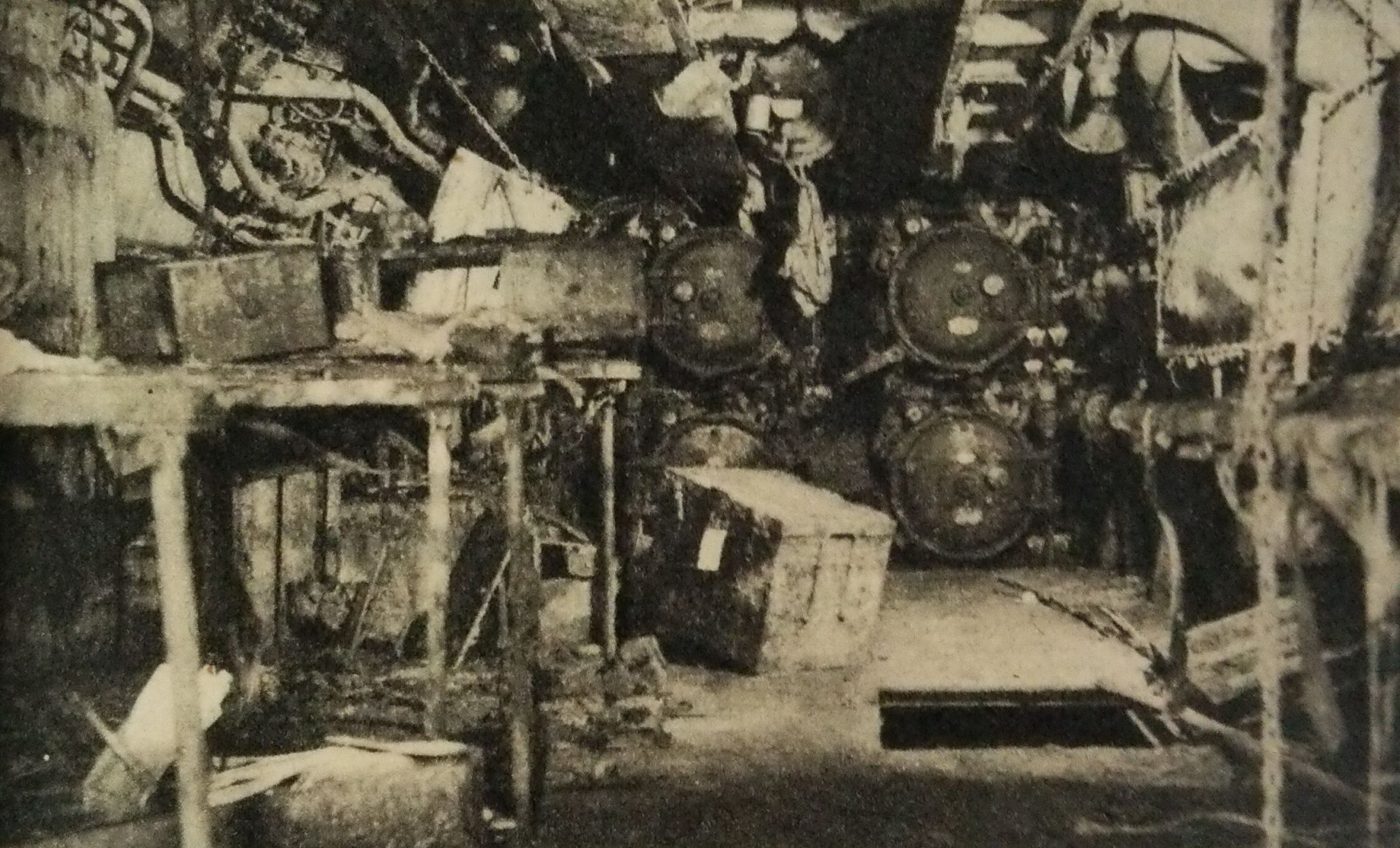
Torpedo room

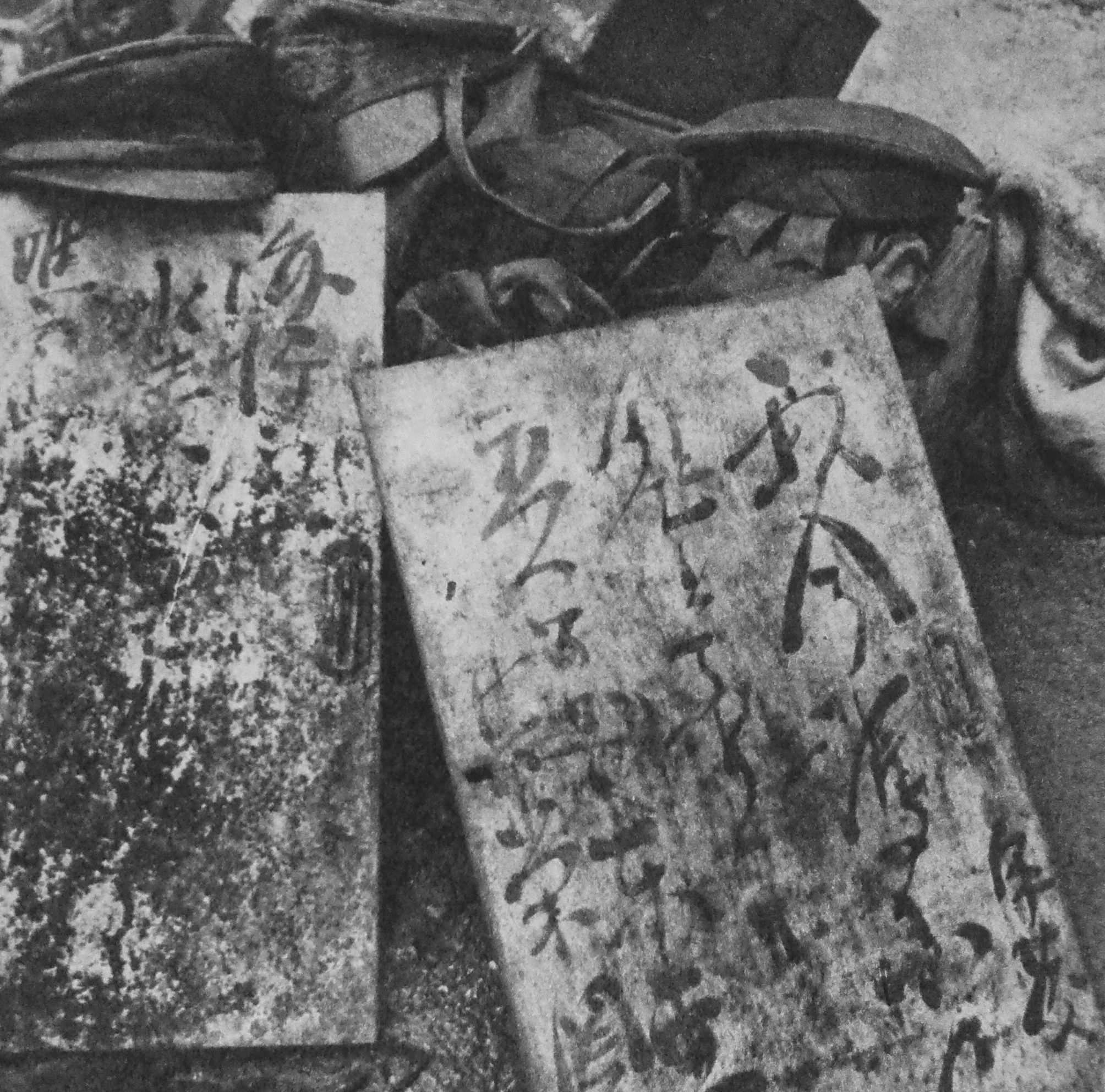
Notes found in the wreck left by crewmen who died on board in June 1944.

== Sources ==
- Hackett, Bob & Kingsepp, Sander. IJN Submarine I-33: Tabular Record of Movement. Retrieved on August 28, 2020.
- Milanovich, Kathrin (2021). "The IJN Submarines of the I 15 Class". In Jordan, John (ed.). Warship 2021. Oxford, UK: Osprey Publishing. pp. 29–43. ISBN 978-1-4728-4779-9.
