= Type A1 submarine =

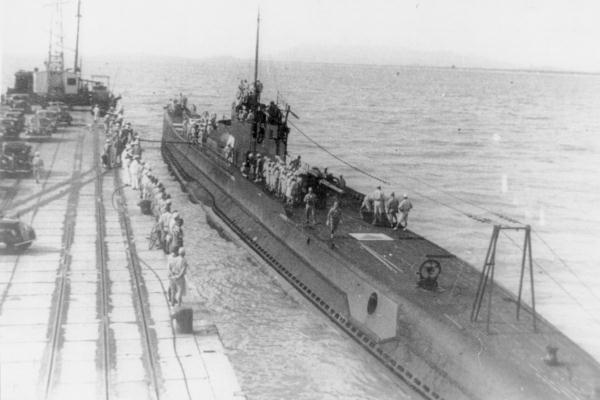
- I-10 in Penang, 1942

Class overview
- Operators: Imperial Japanese Navy
- Preceded by: Type J3 submarine
- Succeeded by: Type A2 submarine
- Built: 1939–1942
- In service: 1941–1944
- Planned: 5
- Completed: 3
- Canceled: 2
- Lost: 3

General characteristics
- Type: Cruiser submarine
- Displacement: 2,966 t (2,919 long tons) (surfaced); 4,195 t (4,129 long tons) (submerged)
- Length: 113.7 m (373 ft) (o/a)
- Beam: 9.5 m (31 ft 2 in)
- Draft: 5.3 m (17 ft 5 in)
- Installed power: 12,400 bhp (9,200 kW) (diesel); 2,400 shp (1,800 kW) (electric motor)
- Propulsion: Diesel-electric; 2 × diesel engines; 2 × electric motors
- Speed: 23.5 knots (43.5 km/h; 27.0 mph) (surfaced); 8 knots (15 km/h; 9.2 mph) (submerged)
- Range: 16,000 nmi (30,000 km; 18,000 mi) at 16 knots (30 km/h; 18 mph) (surfaced); 60 nmi (110 km; 69 mi) at 3 knots (5.6 km/h; 3.5 mph) (submerged)
- Test depth: 100 m (330 ft)
- Crew: 100
- Armament: 6 × bow 533 mm (21 in) torpedo tubes; 1 × 14 cm (5.5 in) deck gun; 2 × twin 25 mm (1 in) AA guns
- Aircraft carried: 1 × Yokosuka E14Y seaplane
- Aviation facilities: 1 × catapult

The Type A1 submarine (巡潜甲型潜水艦, Junsen kō-gata sensuikan, "Cruiser submarine type A"), also called I-9-class submarine (伊九型潜水艦, I-kyū-gata sensuikan) were a trio of aircraft-carrying cruiser submarines built for the Imperial Japanese Navy (IJN) during the 1930s. All three participated in the Pacific War and were lost.

== Design and description ==
The submarines of the A1 type were versions of the preceding J3 class with superior range, improved aircraft installation. Unlike the earlier boats, they were equipped with extensive communication facilities to allow them to serve as squadron flagships. They displaced 2,966 metric tons (2,919 long tons) surfaced and 4,195 t (4,129 long tons) submerged. The submarines were 113.7 meters (373 ft) long, had a beam of 9.5 meters (31 ft 2 in) and a draft of 5.3 meters (17 ft 5 in). They had a diving depth of 100 meters (330 ft).

For surface running, the boats were powered by two 6,200-brake-horsepower (4,623 kW) diesel engines, each driving one propeller shaft. When submerged each propeller was driven by a 1,200-horsepower (895 kW) electric motor. They could reach 19 knots (35 km/h; 22 mph) on the surface and 8.25 knots (15.28 km/h; 9.49 mph) underwater. On the surface, the A1s had a range of 16,000 nautical miles (30,000 km; 18,000 mi) at 16 knots (30 km/h; 18 mph); submerged, they had a range of 90 nmi (170 km; 100 mi) at 3 knots (5.6 km/h; 3.5 mph).

The boats were armed with six internal bow 53.3 cm (21 in) torpedo tubes and carried a total of 18 torpedoes. They were also armed with a single 40-caliber 140 mm (5.5 in) deck gun and two twin 25 mm (1 in) Type 96 anti-aircraft guns.

Unlike the J3 class, the aircraft hangar was integrated into the conning tower and faces forward; the positions of the deck gun and the catapult were exchanged so the aircraft could use the forward motion of the ship to supplement the speed imparted by the catapult. The hangar could be accessed from inside the pressure hull and the floatplane was stowed with its wings folded.

== Boats ==
- I-9 was sunk by destroyer USS Frazier in the Aleutians on 11 June 1943.
- I-10 was sunk by destroyer USS David W. Taylor and destroyer escort USS Riddle east of Saipan on 4 July 1944.
- I-11 disappeared south of Funafuti after 11 January 1944. The I-11 probably struck a mine laid by USS Terror.

Two more boats were ordered under the 1942 Naval Program, but were later cancelled.
