= Japanese submarine I-30 =

Imperial Japanese Navy Type B1 submarine

Coordinates: 1.251°N 103.869°E

- I-30 entering the harbor of Lorient after floatplane test fights, 6 August 1942

History
- Name: I-30
- Builder: Kure Naval Arsenal
- Laid down: 7 June 1939
- Launched: 17 September 1940
- Completed: 28 February 1942
- Fate: Sunk by mine, 13 October 1942, later salvaged and scrapped, 1959-1960

General characteristics
- Class & type: Type B1 submarine
- Displacement: 2,584 long tons (2,625 t) surfaced; 3,654 long tons (3,713 t) submerged
- Length: 108.9 m (357 ft)
- Beam: 9.3 m (31 ft)
- Draft: 5.14 m (16.9 ft)
- Propulsion: 2 × Diesel engines, 12,400 hp (9,200 kW); Electric motors, 2,000 hp (1,500 kW)
- Speed: 23.5 knots (44 km/h) surfaced; 8 knots (15 km/h) submerged
- Range: 14,000 nmi (26,000 km) at 16 kn (30 km/h; 18 mph)
- Test depth: 100 m (330 ft)
- Complement: 94 officers and men
- Armament: 6 × 533 mm (21 in) torpedo tubes; 17 × torpedoes; 1 × 14 cm/40 11th Year Type naval gun
- Aircraft carried: 1 × Yokosuka E14Y floatplane

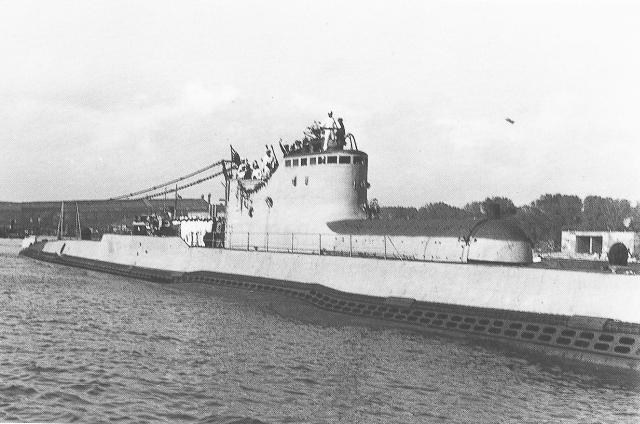
I-30 anchored in Lorient shortly before departure, 23 August 1942, having been repainted in the manner of a German U-boat

I-30 was a Type B1 submarine of the Imperial Japanese Navy during World War II. After operating in the Indian Ocean she participated in a Yanagi mission, aimed at connecting Japan and Nazi Germany by submarine. She was the first Japanese submarine to reach Europe, arriving at Lorient, France in August 1942. I-30 returned to Singapore loaded with military technology and information, but hit a mine outside the harbour and sank. Only part of her cargo was salvaged.

== Service history ==
The submarine was laid down at the Kure Naval Arsenal on 7 June 1939, launched on 17 September 1940, completed on 28 February 1942, and commissioned with Commander Endo Shinobu in command.

=== Indian Ocean operations ===
On 27 March 1942 the German Kriegsmarine naval staff requested that the Imperial Navy launch operations against Allied convoys in the Indian Ocean, and on 8 April the Japanese agreed to dispatch a detachment of submarines to the East Coast of Africa. Submarine Squadron 8's 1st Division was withdrawn from its base at Kwajalein in the Marshall Islands and assigned the task.

On 11 April, I-30 departed Kure for Penang, Malaya, arriving on the 20th. Two days later she sailed from Penang accompanied by the auxiliary cruiser and supply ship Aikoku Maru to reconnoitre selected points on the East African coast. In May I-30 sailed along the coast of Africa, launching its Yokosuka E14Y floatplane on a series of reconnaissance flights over Aden, Zanzibar, Dar es Salaam, and Durban, East London, Port Elizabeth and Simon's Town in South Africa searching for targets.

On the night of 29 May I-30 she sent her aircraft to the harbour of Diego Suarez at Madagascar, which was occupied by the British. The next night the Type C submarines I-16 and I-20 launched their Ko-hyoteki midget submarines about 10 miles from the harbour. At 20:25, one torpedoed and damaged the Ramillies. The corvettes counter-attacked with depth charges, but at 21:20 the midget from I-20 torpedoed and sank the British Loyalty. The I-16's midget submarine went missing, presumed sunk, while the I-20's beached further along the coast. Its two crewmen were discovered by Royal Marines, and in the ensuing firefight both were killed.

=== Voyage to Europe ===
In mid-June 1942 I-30 was sent on a Yanagi mission to Europe, rounding the Cape of Good Hope and entering the Atlantic en route to France. On 2 August she arrived in the Bay of Biscay and was escorted into Lorient by a powerful force of German M-class minesweepers and Luftwaffe Junkers Ju 88 bombers. I-30 was the first Japanese submarine to arrive in Europe during World War II.

The officers and crew of I-30 were greeted by Grossadmiral Erich Raeder, Admiral Karl Dönitz, and Captain Yokoi Tadao, the Japanese Naval Attaché to Germany. The officers and crew of I-30 were feted by their German allies, travelling to Berlin where Commander Endo was presented to Adolf Hitler, and returning to Lorient via a sightseeing trip to Paris. In the meantime the I-30's cargo of 1,500 kg (3,300 lb) of mica and 650 kg (1,430 lb) of shellac was unloaded. They also supplied the Germans with blueprints of the Type 91 aerial torpedo. I-30 departed Lorient on 22 August carrying a Japanese engineer as a passenger.

=== Sinking ===
On 8 October 1942 I-30 arrived at Penang to refuel and replenish, then sailed for Singapore, arriving early on the 13th. Just after 4 p.m. the same day, she departed for Japan, but three miles east of Keppel Harbour hit a British mine and quickly sank with the loss of 13 men. Divers from No. 101 Navy Repair Unit recovered some of her cargo, including most of the 20 mm guns and torpedo data computers, but the Wurzburg radar equipment and 40 of the 50 Enigma machines she was carrying were lost, while the radar blueprints were found to be unusable after their immersion in salt water.

Between August 1959 and February 1960 the wreck was salvaged and then scrapped by Hokusei Sempaku Kogyo K.K.

== Bibliography ==
- Milanovich, Kathrin (2021). "The IJN Submarines of the I 15 Class". In Jordan, John (ed.). Warship 2021. Oxford, UK: Osprey Publishing. pp. 29–43. ISBN 978-1-4728-4779-9.
