= Japanese submarine I-11 =

World War II Japanese Submarine

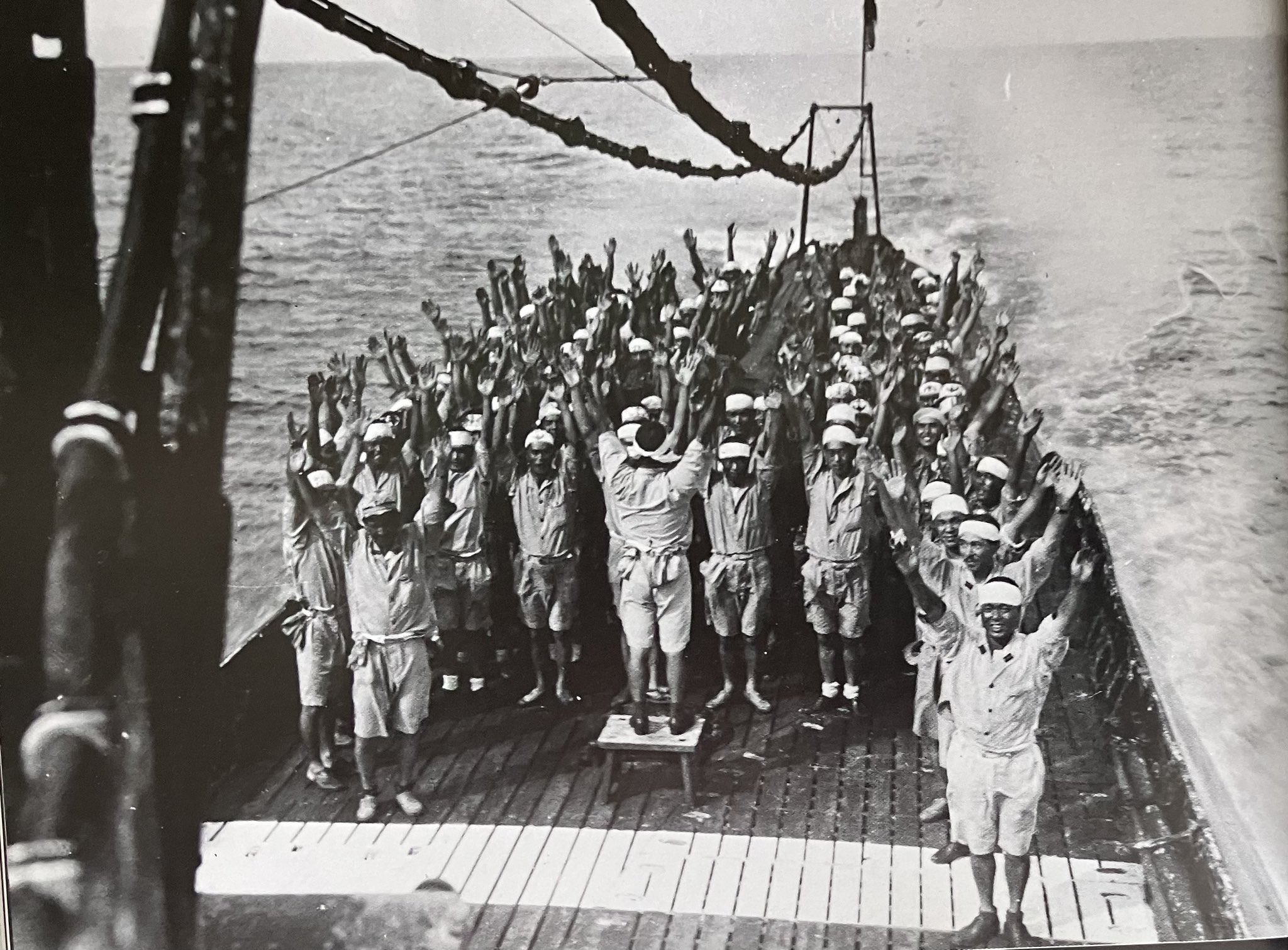
- I-11's aft deck, showing the crew performing morning exercises, 9 September 1942

History

Empire of Japan
- Name: Submarine No. 125
- Builder: Kawasaki, Kobe, Japan
- Laid down: 10 April 1939
- Launched: 28 February 1941
- Renamed: I-11 28 February 1941
- Completed: 16 May 1942
- Commissioned: 16 May 1942
- Fate: Missing after 11 January 1944
- Stricken: 30 April 1944

Service record
- Part of: Submarine Squadron 3; Submarine Squadron 1
- Commanders: Tsuneo Shichiji; 16 May 1942 – 7 July 1943; Meiji Tagami; 7 July 1943 – 10 October 1943; Hisaichi Izu; 10 October 1943 – January 1944

General characteristics
- Class & type: Type A1 submarine
- Displacement: 2,966 tonnes (2,919 long tons) surfaced; 4,195 tonnes (4,129 long tons) submerged
- Length: 113.7 m (373 ft 0 in) overall
- Beam: 9.5 m (31 ft 2 in)
- Draft: 5.3 m (17 ft 5 in)
- Installed power: 12,400 bhp (9,200 kW) (diesel); 2,400 hp (1,800 kW) (electric motor)
- Propulsion: Diesel-electric; 1 × diesel engine; 1 × electric motor
- Speed: 23.5 knots (43.5 km/h; 27.0 mph) surfaced; 8 knots (15 km/h; 9.2 mph) submerged
- Range: 16,000 nmi (30,000 km; 18,000 mi) at 16 knots (30 km/h; 18 mph) surfaced; 60 nmi (110 km; 69 mi) at 3 knots (5.6 km/h; 3.5 mph) submerged
- Test depth: 100 m (330 ft)
- Crew: 100
- Armament: 6 × bow 533 mm (21 in) torpedo tubes; 1 × 140 mm (5.5 in)/40 deck gun; 2 × twin 25 mm (1 in) Type 96 anti-aircraft guns
- Aircraft carried: 1 × Yokosuka E14Y seaplane
- Aviation facilities: 1 × catapult

I-11 was an Imperial Japanese Navy Type A1 submarine that served during World War II. Designed as a submarine aircraft carrier and submarine squadron flagship, she was commissioned in 1942. She participated in the Guadalcanal campaign and patrolled off Australia, New Caledonia, and the Ellice Islands before she disappeared in 1944 during her sixth war patrol. She badly damaged the Royal Australian Navy light cruiser HMAS Hobart in 1943.

== Design and description ==
Type A1 submarines were versions of the preceding Type J3 with superior range and an improved aircraft installation, and they were fitted as squadron flagships. They displaced 2,966 tonnes (2,919 long tons) on the surface and 4,195 tonnes (4,129 long tons) submerged. The submarines were 113.7 meters (373 ft 0 in) long and had a beam of 9.5 meters (31 ft 2 in) and a draft of 5.3 meters (17 ft 5 in). They had a diving depth of 100 meters (328 ft).

For surface running, Type A1 submarines were powered by two 6,200-brake-horsepower (4,623 kW) diesel engines, each driving one propeller shaft. When submerged each propeller was driven by a 1,200-horsepower (895 kW) electric motor. They could reach 19 knots (35 km/h; 22 mph) on the surface and 8.25 knots (15.28 km/h; 9.49 mph) underwater. On the surface, the Type A1s had a range of 16,000 nautical miles (29,600 km; 18,400 mi) at 16 knots (30 km/h; 18 mph); submerged, they had a range of 90 nmi (170 km; 100 mi) at 3 knots (5.6 km/h; 3.5 mph).

Type A1 submarines were armed with four internal bow 53.3 cm (21.0 in) torpedo tubes and carried a total of 18 torpedoes. They were also armed with a single 140 mm (5.5 in)/40 deck gun and two twin 25 mm (1 in) Type 96 anti-aircraft guns.

Unlike on the Type J3 submarines, the aircraft hangar was integrated into the conning tower and faced forward, and the aircraft catapult was forward of the hangar, while the deck gun was aft of the conning tower. Reversing the locations of the deck gun and catapult allowed aircraft launching from a Type A1 submarine to use the forward motion of the submarine to supplement the speed imparted by the catapult.

== Construction and commissioning ==
Built by Kawasaki at Kobe, Japan, I-11 was laid down as Submarine No. 125 on 10 April 1939. Provisionally attached to the Kure Naval District on 5 February 1941, she was launched on 28 February 1941 and was named I-11 that day. She was completed and commissioned on 16 May 1942.

== Service history ==
=== May–July 1942 ===
I-11 was formally attached to the Kure Naval District on the day of her commissioning, with Commander Tsuneo Shichiji in command, and also became the new flagship of Submarine Squadron 3 that day, replacing the damaged submarine I-8 in that role. She moved to Kure, Japan, in late May 1942 for work-ups, embarking an 11th Naval Air Arsenal Yokosuka E14Y1 floatplane for aircraft launch and recovery exercises.

I-11 departed Kure on 7 June 1942 and proceeded to Kwajalein Atoll, which she reached on 16 June. She continued her floatplane launch and recovery exercises at Kwajalein, during which one member of her crew suffered injuries due to an aircraft catapult malfunction. On 8 July 1942, she embarked the commander of Submarine Squadron 3, Rear Admiral Chimaki Kono, who transferred his flag from the submarine tender Yasukumi Maru, as well as his six-man staff and a war correspondent from the newspaper Yomiuri Shimbun.

=== First war patrol ===
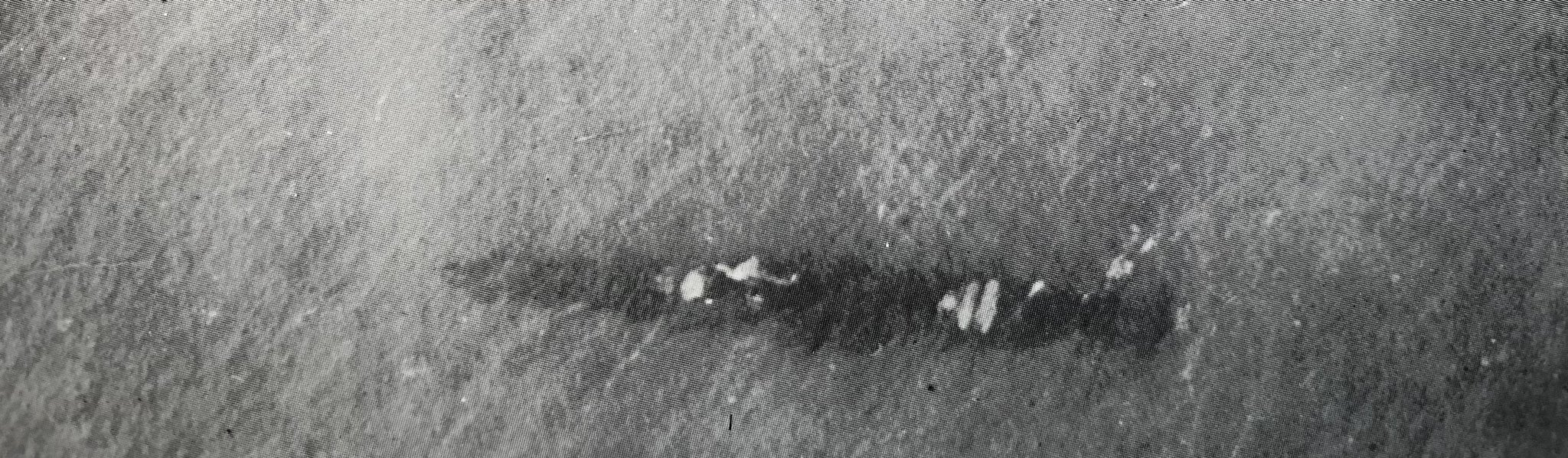
I-11 submerged underwater off the Kejelin Atoll, June 1942

I-11 originally was scheduled to put to sea from Kwajalein in company with the submarine I-175 on 8 July 1942, but her departure was delayed until the day after, when she got underway to begin her first war patrol, assigned a patrol area in the Tasman Sea off the east coast of Australia. While on the surface there at 23:01 Australian Eastern Time on 20 July, she hit the Greek 5,482-gross register ton steamer SS George S. Livanos with one torpedo 15 nautical miles (28 km; 17 mi) off Jervis Bay, New South Wales, Australia. George S. Livanos, which was carrying a cargo of 87 military motor vehicles, sank seven minutes later. Still on the surface at 02:04 the next day, I-11 fired two torpedoes at the American 3,290-gross register ton armed merchant ship SS Coast Farmer. Both torpedoes hit Coast Farmer amidships, and Coast Farmer sank 20 minutes later. I-11 illuminated Coast Farmer′s lifeboats after the sinking, and after examining them headed southwest along the Australian coast.

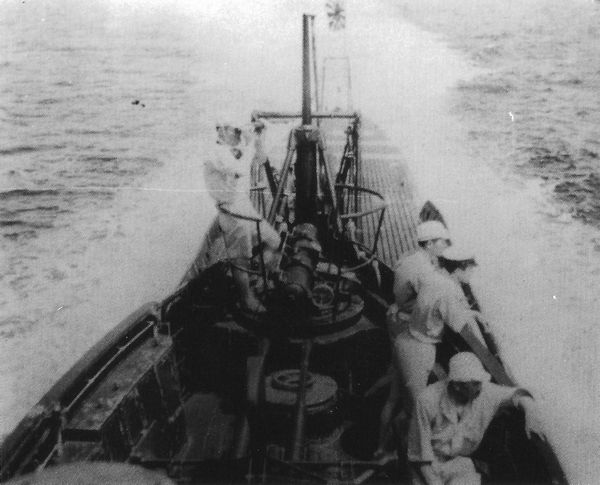
I-11 on patrol in the South Pacific, July 1942

On 22 July at 05:45, I-11 was on the surface off the coast of New South Wales east of the lighthouse at Twofold Bay when she fired three torpedoes at the American armed Liberty ship SS William Dawes, which was carrying a cargo of 82 jeeps, 72 half-ton pickup trucks, 60 one-ton trailers, and dozens of trucks, ambulances and halftracks. Two of the torpedoes hit, starting a fire, and William Dawes sank at approximately 16:30 with the loss of one United States Army soldier and four members of her United States Navy Armed Guard killed and four personnel wounded. That evening, an RAAF Bristol Beaufort torpedo bomber attacked I-11 unsuccessfully.

As I-11 continued to work her way to the southwest, her lookouts sighted what they reported as a convoy of eight transports escorted by two light cruisers and two destroyers at about 12:00 on 24 July. I-11 was unable to close with the ships because they were at a great distance. At 04:06 on the 27th, she fired a single torpedo at the Australian 2,197-gross register ton merchant ship Coolana while north of Cape Howe. The torpedo missed, so I-11 surfaced and attempted to attack Coolana with gunfire, but rough seas made targeting Coolana difficult with I-11′s deck gun. After Coolana transmitted an SOS, I-11 submerged and fired another torpedo, but it also missed, and Coolana escaped undamaged.

At 05:00 on 29 July, a Bristol Beaufort of the RAAF's No. 100 Squadron attacked I-11 when she was off Disaster Bay northeast of Gabo Island, and heading south at 7 knots (13 km/h; 8.1 mph). I-11 made a crash dive and submerged before the Beaufort, whose bomb bay doors stuck, could drop its six 250-pound (113 kg) bombs. The Beaufort's pilot claimed a kill, but I-11 was undamaged, although her crew found numerous bomb fragments on her afterdeck after she surfaced.

I-11′s lookouts sighted a convoy with several small escorts while she was on the surface in the Tasman Sea at 23:30 on 30 July 1942, and she set off in pursuit. At 02:50 on 31 July, southwest of the lighthouse at Cape Everard, she fired two torpedoes at overlapping targets and heard one explosion. The convoy's escorts attempted a counterattack, but could not locate I-11.

On 1 August 1942, I-11 reached the southernmost boundary of her patrol area at the eastern entrance to the Bass Strait and began her return voyage. She arrived at the Japanese naval base at Truk Atoll on 11 August 1942.

=== Second war patrol ===
While I-11 was at sea, the Guadalcanal campaign began with United States Marine Corps landings on Guadalcanal, Tulagi, Florida Island, Gavutu, and Tanambogo in the southeastern Solomon Islands on 7 August 1942. On 20 August, she began her second war patrol, departing Truk for a patrol area in the vicinity of the Santa Cruz Islands and southeastern Solomons. On 26 August, the commander of the Advance Force ordered I-11 and the submarines I-15, I-17, I-19, I-26, I-33, I-174, and I-175 to deploy to the south and east of San Cristobal to interdict American supplies and reinforcements bound for Guadalcanal. While in the Coral Sea southeast of Tulagi at 04:05 on 31 August, I-11 attacked what she identified as a 15,000-ton transport escorted by a destroyer and claimed two torpedo hits.

At 11:49 on 6 September 1942, I-11 was submerged northwest of Espiritu Santo in the New Hebrides at 13°20′S 162°40′E when she detected United States Navy Task Force 17, centered around the aircraft carrier USS Hornet (CV-8) and battleship USS North Carolina (BB-55). She penetrated the task force′s screen and identified Hornet as an "Enterprise-class" aircraft carrier. As Hornet passed ahead of her at 12:49 at a range of 765 yards (700 m), I-11 fired four torpedoes, dived to 200 feet (61 m), and rigged for silent running.

At 12:51, Hornet sighted a torpedo wake off her starboard quarter, and the pilot of a TBF-1 Avenger torpedo bomber patrolling overhead saw what he identified as the conning tower of a submarine breaking the surface between North Carolina and a destroyer on plane guard duty. The Avenger pilot dropped a 325-pound (147 kg) depth charge on what he thought was a conning tower; its explosion detonated two of I-11′s incoming torpedoes, and I-11′s crew heard two large explosions at 12:52. Hornet began a hard turn to port, while North Carolina turned to starboard. One torpedo passed 400 yards (370 m) off North Carolina′s port side.

The task force's escorts began searching for I-11, and at 14:52 the destroyer USS Russell (DD-414) gained contact on her and dropped six 600-pound (272 kg) depth charges. At 15:13, Russell′s lookouts sighted an oil slick 1 nautical mile (1.9 km; 1.2 mi) long by 0.5 nautical mile (0.9 km; 0.6 mi) wide, but Russell lost contact with I-11 at a range of 700 yards (640 m). When Russell regained contact, I-11, operating at a depth of 100 feet (30 m), made a late detection of the approaching destroyer and commenced a dive to 200 feet (61 m). Russell′s subsequent depth-charge attack resulted in a number of explosions close aboard that caused a minor leak at I-11′s stern through her propeller shaft gland, temporarily disabled her sound gear, and wrecked 80 per cent of her batteries. The battery damage and leak caused her forward compartments to fill with poisonous chlorine gas. I-11 reached a depth of 490 feet (149 m) before her crew could regain control of her.

I-11′s crew put on gas masks and rewired the intact batteries to partially restore electrical power. During the evening of 6 September 1942, seven hours after the depth-charge attack, I-11 surfaced. Her crew assessed that they could repair the leak, but determined that I-11 could not dive, so she made for Truk on the surface at best possible speed. On 7 September 1942, a U.S. Navy PBY-5 Catalina flying boat of Patrol Squadron 11 (VP-11) attacked her northeast of Santa Isabel Island at 07°12′S 163°14′E while I-11′s crew fired at the PBY with her 140-millimeter (5.5 in) deck gun and her four 25 mm antiaircraft guns, along with three Type 38 carbines and her floatplane's 7.7 mm (0.303 in) Type 92 machine gun, which they had lashed to her bridge railing. The PBY dropped three bombs, one of which landed close aboard but inflicted no further damage. Another PBY attacked her on 8 September 1942 between 14:00 and 14:15, making several strafing runs and scoring another near-miss with a bomb. She reached Truk on 11 September 1942.

=== September 1942–January 1943 ===
At Truk, Submarine Squadron 3's flag shifted from I-11 to the submarine tender Yasukuni Maru and makeshift repairs were made on I-11. With them complete, she departed Truk on 15 September 1942 and headed for Kure, making the entire voyage on the surface. She reached Kure on 23 September 1942, returned her floatplane — which had survived Russell′s depth-charging in flyable condition — to the 11th Naval Air Arsenal, and began repairs. After completion of her repairs, I-11 departed Kure on 9 January 1943 and arrived on 15 January at Truk, where on 18 January she was designated the flagship of Submarine Force A under the command of Rear Admiral Katsumi Komazawa.

=== Third war patrol ===
The Japanese decided in January 1943 to evacuate their forces from Guadalcanal in Operation Ke. With a Yokosuka E14Y (Allied reporting name "Glen") floatplane aboard, I-11 departed Truk on 19 January to begin her third war patrol, resuming her participation in the Guadalcanal campaign. She was assigned a patrol area south of Guadalcanal and north of Rennell Island, where she and the submarines I-16, I-17, I-18, I-20, I-25, I-26, I-32, and I-176 were tasked to intercept Allied naval forces steaming to and from the Guadalcanal area.

On 31 January, I-11 received orders to proceed to the waters east of San Cristóbal in support of ships of the 2nd and 3rd Fleets as they conducted the evacuation. On 2 February 1943, Rear Admiral Komazawa ordered the submarines of Submarine Squadron 3 to intercept a U.S. Navy aircraft carrier task force reportedly operating 100 nautical miles (185 km; 115 mi) southeast of San Cristóbal. At 10:00 on 7 February, I-11 sighted a U.S. aircraft carrier steaming south and began an approach, but an inaccurate depth setting for I-11′s torpedoes prevented a successful attack. The Japanese completed the evacuation of Guadalcanal on 8 February 1943.

Meanwhile, I-11 received orders on 7 February 1943 after her unsuccessful attempt to attack the aircraft carrier to use her floatplane to reconnoiter the harbor and nearby airfields at Nouméa on the coast of Grande Terre in New Caledonia. The E14Y1 made the reconnaissance flight on 21 February, and its crew reported an aircraft carrier, two battleships, and some smaller ships in the harbor. The floatplane made another flight on 1 March 1943 to investigate the Chesterfield Reefs, and was damaged during its recovery after it returned to I-11. I-11 concluded her patrol with her return to Truk on 10 March 1943.

=== Fourth war patrol ===
I-11 got underway from Truk with Rear Admiral Komazaki and his staff aboard on 10 April 1943 to conduct her fourth war patrol. I-11 and the submarines I-177, I-178, and I-180, which also departed that day, all were tasked with attacking Allied shipping off Australia. I-11 was assigned a patrol area in the Tasman Sea off the east coast of Australia. While 70 nautical miles (130 km; 81 mi) north of Gabo Island on 27 April she made an unsuccessful attack on Convoy OC-90 during its voyage from Melbourne, Victoria, to Newcastle, New South Wales. On 29 May 1943, she fired two torpedoes at the American Liberty ship SS Sheldon Jackson 150 nautical miles (280 km; 170 mi) northeast of Sydney, Australia, but both missed. She returned to Truk on 10 June 1943.

=== Fifth war patrol ===
I-11 departed Truk with a Yokosuka E14Y1 (Allied reporting name "Glen") floatplane embarked to commence her fifth war patrol on 1 July 1943. She received a new captain before the patrol, Commander Meiji Tagami, who was officially appointed on 7 July. Her patrol area was in the New Caledonia area. At sunset on 20 July she was off San Cristóbal when she sighted the mixed Royal Australian Navy–U.S. Navy Task Force 74. She fired two Type 95 torpedoes at the heavy cruiser HMAS Australia. They passed astern of Australia, but at 18:45 one of them struck the Australian light cruiser HMAS Hobart on her port quarter at 15°07′S 163°43′E, breaking her keel, blowing off two propellers, unseating "Y" turret, knocking out all power and steering control, and killing 13 crewmen and badly injuring seven others. Hobart took on a port list, but made port at Espiritu Santo. Repairs kept her out of the war for 17 months.

After sunset on 25 July, I-11′s floatplane made a reconnaissance flight over the Nouméa area, its crew reporting cruisers and smaller ships in the harbor there. She was off Nouméa on 11 August 1943 when she hit the American 7,176-ton Liberty ship SS Matthew Lyon with one torpedo at 22°30′S 165°59′W. The torpedo opened a 35-foot (11 m) long hole in Matthew Lyon′s No. 3 hold and injured one sailor, but the ship managed to reach Espiritu Santo under her own power. I-11 returned to Truk on 13 September 1943.

=== September–December 1943 ===
While I-11 was at Truk, Submarine Squadron 3 was abolished on 15 September 1943, and I-11 became flagship of Submarine Squadron 1. She departed Truk on 18 September bound for Kure, which she reached on 26 September. She received a new commanding officer, Commander Hisaichi Izu, on 10 October 1943. After undergoing repairs, she departed Kure on 4 December 1943 and headed back to Truk, where she arrived in mid-December 1943.

=== Sixth war patrol ===
On 21 December 1943, I-11 departed Truk with a Yokosuka E14Y1 (Allied reporting name "Glen") floatplane aboard for her sixth war patrol, bound for a patrol area in the vicinity of the Ellice Islands, Samoan Islands, Fiji Islands, and Tonga Islands. On 31 December, she conducted a submerged reconnaissance of Funafuti in the Ellice Islands, reporting that she observed two battleships, two other large warships resembling battleships, and two cruisers there. On 11 January 1944, she transmitted a report from the Funafuti area and received orders to attack Allied ships in the vicinity of the Ellice Islands and Samoan Islands, as well as to reconnoiter Funafuti again in early February 1944. The Japanese never heard from her again.

=== Loss ===
I-11′s fate remains a mystery. One source claims the U.S. Navy destroyer USS Nicholas (DD-449) sank her on 17 February 1944 but that assertion appears to confuse I-11 with the submarine I-175, sunk off Wotje Atoll in the Marshall Islands on 4 February 1944. Post-World War II Japanese research has suggested that a mine laid by the U.S. Navy minelayer USS Terror (CM-5) sank I-11.

On 20 March 1944, the Japanese declared I-11 to be presumed lost south of Funafuti with all 114 men on board. She was stricken from the navy list on 30 April 1944.

== Summery of raiding history ==
Date	Name	Classification	Tonnage	Nationality	Result
20 July 1942	George S. Livanos	Steamship	5,482	Greece	Sunk
21 July 1942	Coast Farmer	Armed merchant ship	3,290	USA	Sunk
22 July 1942	William Dawes	Cargo ship	7,176	USA	Sunk
20 July 1943	HMAS Hobart	Light cruiser	9,900	Australia	Damaged
