= Operation K =

Bombing of Oahu by Japanese flying boats during WW2

- Part of the Pacific War and World War II
- Approximate route of Operation K.
Date	4 March 1942
Location	Wotje Atoll in the Marshall Islands; French Frigate Shoals; Oahu
Result	Inconclusive

Belligerents
United States	Japan

Commanders and leaders
None	Hisao Hashizume

Strength
None	2 Kawanishi H8Ks; 3 submarines

Casualties and losses
Minimal private property damage	Loss of submarine I-23

Operation K (K作戦, Kē-Sakusen) was a Japanese naval operation in World War II, intended as reconnaissance of Pearl Harbor and disruption of repair and salvage operations following the surprise attack on 7 December 1941. It culminated on 4 March 1942, with an unsuccessful attack carried out by two Kawanishi H8K "Emily" flying boats. This was the longest distance ever undertaken by a two-plane bombing mission, and one of the longest bombing sorties ever planned without fighter escort.

== Planning ==
The planning for Operation K began in the weeks after the attack on Pearl Harbor, when the Imperial Japanese Navy high command considered how to take advantage of the capabilities of the long-range Kawanishi H8K flying boats. Plans to bomb California and Texas were being discussed, when the need for updated information regarding the repairs to US Navy facilities at Pearl Harbor took precedence. An assessment of the repairs to the docks, yards and airfields of Oahu would help the IJN staff to determine American ability to project power for months to come.

Initial plans called for the use of five H8K aircraft. They would fly to French Frigate Shoals, the largest atoll in the Northwestern Hawaiian Islands, to be refueled by submarines prior to taking off for Oahu. The raid was planned to coincide with the full moon to illuminate the Pearl Harbor target area, but the actual date of execution would depend on calm weather for refueling at French Frigate Shoals and clear skies over Pearl Harbor. If the first raid was successful, additional raids would be made.

In a repeat of events just prior to the 7 December attack, American codebreakers warned that the Japanese were preparing for reconnaissance and disruption raids, refueling at French Frigate Shoals, and again were largely ignored by their superiors. The codebreakers had reason to correctly interpret the Japanese intent. Edwin T. Layton's staff included Lieutenant Jasper Holmes, who, writing under the pen name Alec Hudson, had a story entitled Rendezvous published in an August, 1941, Saturday Evening Post. His fictitious story about refueling United States planes from submarines at a remote island for an air attack on a target 3,000 miles (4,800 km) away had been withheld from publication for a year until the author convinced United States Navy censors the techniques described were known to other navies.

== Execution ==
When time came for the raid, only two of the big flying boats were available. Pilot Lieutenant Hisao Hashizume was in command of the mission, with Ensign Shosuke Sasao flying the second airplane. They were sent to Wotje Atoll in the Marshall Islands, where each airplane was loaded with four 250-kilogram (551 lb) bombs. From there, they flew 1,900 miles (3,100 km) to French Frigate Shoals to refuel, then set off for Oahu, 900 kilometers (560 mi) distant. In addition to their reconnaissance mission, they were to bomb the "Ten-Ten" dock – named for its length, 1,010 feet (310 m) – at the Pearl Harbor naval base to disrupt salvage and repair efforts. However, errors ensued on both sides.

The Japanese submarine I-23 was supposed to station herself just south of Oahu as a "lifeguard" and weather spotter for the flying boats, but was lost sometime after 14 February. Japanese cryptanalysts had broken the United States Navy weather code, but a code change on 1 March eliminated that alternative source of weather information over Pearl Harbor. The mission proceeded on the assumption of clear skies over Pearl Harbor from knowledge of conditions at French Frigate Shoals.

American radar stations on Kauai (and later Oahu) picked up and tracked the two planes as they approached the main Hawaiian Islands, prompting a search by Curtiss P-40 Warhawk fighters. Consolidated PBY Catalina flying boats were also sent to seek Japanese aircraft carriers, which were assumed to have launched the two invaders. However, a thick layer of nimbus clouds over Pearl Harbor prevented the defenders from spotting the Japanese planes flying at an altitude of 4,600 meters (15,000 ft).

Those same clouds also confused the IJN pilots. Using the Kaena Point lighthouse for a position fix, Hashizume decided to attack from the north. Sasao, however, did not hear Hashizume's order and instead turned to skirt the southern coast of Oahu.

Hashizume, having lost sight of his wingman, and only able to see small patches of the island, dropped his four bombs on the slopes of Tantalus Peak, an extinct volcano cinder cone just north of Honolulu sometime between 02:00 and 02:15 HST. He was unable to see Pearl Harbor, the only lit facility on Oahu, due to blackout conditions intended to hinder air raids. Hashizume's bombs landed about 300 meters (1,000 ft) from Roosevelt High School, creating craters 2–3 meters (6–10 ft) deep and 6–9 meters (20–30 ft) across. Damage was limited to shattered windows. Sasao is assumed by historians and officials to have eventually dropped his bombs into the ocean, either off the coast of Waianae or near the sea approach to Pearl Harbor. The two flying boats then flew southwest toward the Marshall Islands. Sasao returned as planned to Wotje atoll, but Hashizume's airplane had sustained hull damage while taking off from French Frigate Shoals. Fearing the primitive base at Wotje was insufficient to repair the damage, Hashizume proceeded non-stop all the way to their home base at Jaluit Atoll, also in the Marshall Islands. That made his flight the longest bombing mission in history up to that point.

== Aftermath ==
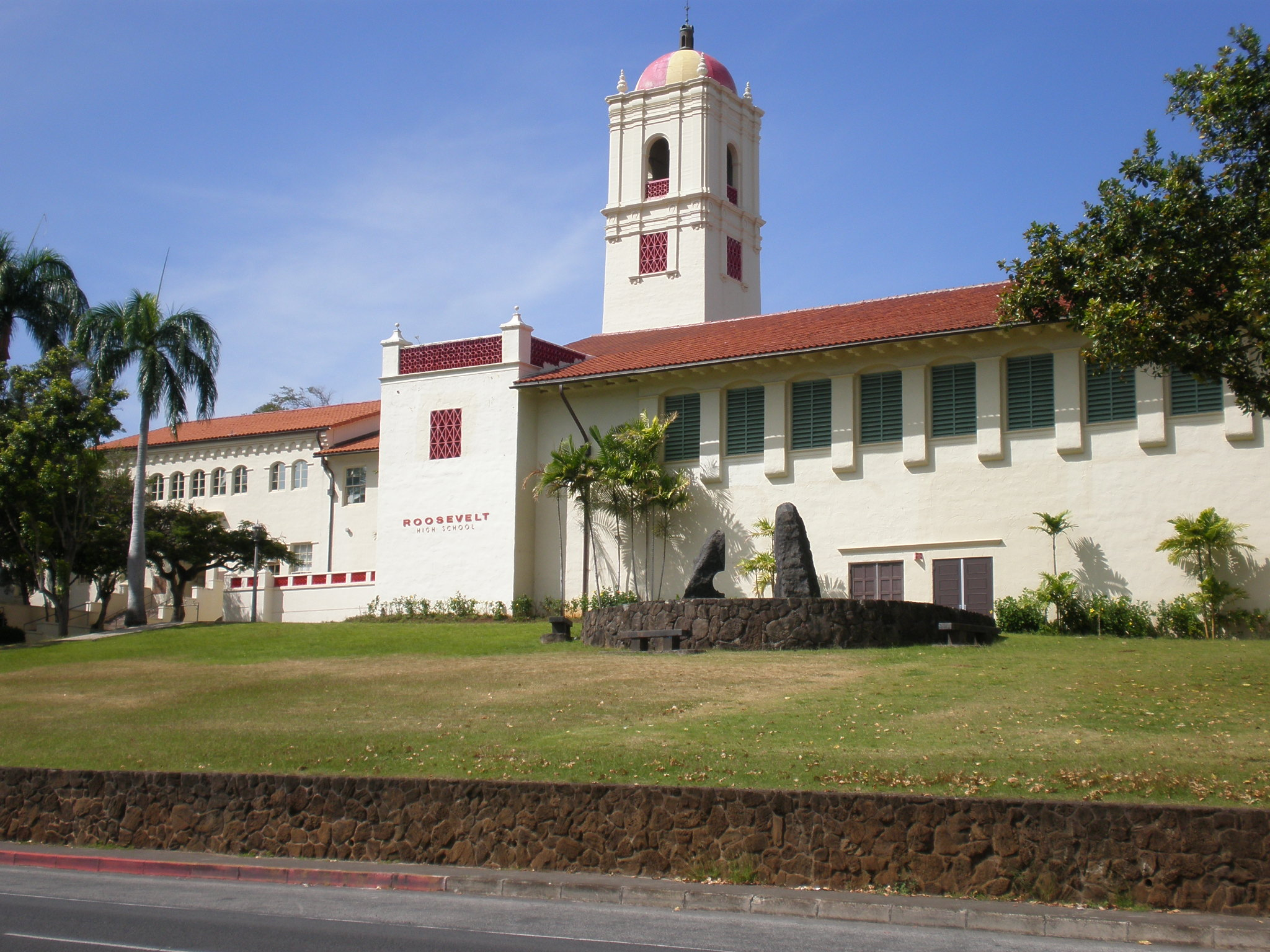
President Theodore Roosevelt High School in Honolulu was damaged by bombs dropped nearby from Operation K.

There were no American casualties. The raid did raise new fears of a potential Japanese invasion of Hawaii.

Japanese media repeated an unsubstantiated Los Angeles radio report of "considerable damage to Pearl Harbor" with 30 dead sailors and civilians, with 70 wounded. Both the U.S. Army and U.S. Navy blamed each other for the explosions, accusing each other of jettisoning munitions into Tantalus.

Another armed reconnaissance mission, scheduled for 6 or 7 March, was canceled because of the delay in launching the first raid, damage to Hashizume's airplane, and the aircrews' exhaustion. It was carried out on 10 March, but Hashizume was killed when his flying boat was shot down by Brewster F2A Buffalo fighters near Midway Atoll.

A followup to Operation K was scheduled for 30 May, to gain intelligence on the whereabouts of U.S. aircraft carriers prior to the Battle of Midway. However, the Americans had become aware French Frigate Shoals was a possible IJN rendezvous point, and naval patrols were increased, per Admiral Chester Nimitz's orders. The Japanese submarine I-123 found the area mined and spotted two American warships at anchor there, prompting a cancellation of the plan, despite the proposed use of Necker Island as an alternative refueling site. This left the IJN unable to observe U.S. Navy activity or track the American carriers.

== See also ==
- Lookout Air Raids
