= Japanese submarine I-23 =

1st class submarine of the Imperial Japanese Navy

- I-23 (right) and I-17 under construction in Yokosuka Naval Arsenal, 19 July 1939

History

Japan
- Name: I-23
- Builder: Kure Naval Arsenal
- Laid down: Yokosuka Navy Yard as Submarine No. 41, 8 December 1938
- Launched: 24 November 1939
- Commissioned: 27 September 1941
- Fate: Missing after 24 February 1942

General characteristics
- Class & type: Type B1 submarine
- Displacement: 2,584 long tons (2,625 t) surfaced; 3,654 long tons (3,713 t) submerged
- Length: 108.6 m (356 ft)
- Beam: 9.3 m (31 ft)
- Draft: 5.14 m (16.9 ft)
- Propulsion: 2 × Diesel engines, 12,400 hp (9,200 kW); Electric motors, 2,000 hp (1,500 kW)
- Speed: 23.5 knots (44 km/h) surfaced; 8 knots (15 km/h) submerged
- Armament: 6 × 533 mm (21 in) torpedo tubes; 17 × torpedoes; 1 × 14 cm/40 11th Year Type naval gun
- Aircraft carried: 1 x Watanabe E9W1 Type 96 "Slim" floatplane

I-23 was a Type B1 submarine of the Imperial Japanese Navy during World War II. After a raid on the West Coast of California she participated in an attempt at a second attack upon Pearl Harbor. After surviving an American air attack on Kwajalein I-23 was lost in early 1942 with all hands somewhere off the Oahu coast of Hawaii.

== Service history ==
The submarine was laid down at the Yokosuka Naval Arsenal on 8 December 1938, as Submarine No. 41. She was launched on 24 November 1939 with Shibata Genichi as Chief Equipping Officer, and Commander Shibata as Commanding Officer. She was then assigned to Rear Admiral Sato Tsutomu's SubRon 1 Division, along with I-21 and I-22.

=== Attack on a Lexington-class aircraft carrier ===
On 9 December 1941 I-6 reported sighting a Lexington-class aircraft carrier, as well as two cruisers, off Oahu. Vice Admiral Shimizu in Katori ordered all of SubRon 1's boats, except the Special Attack Force, to pursue and sink the carrier. By the next day, while proceeding surfaced, I-23's lookouts reported sighting an American patrol plane. While crash diving, I-23 accidentally descended to the depth of 120 m (390 ft).

=== Attack on the West Coast ===
On 11 December 1941 I-23 was redirected to the West Coast of the United States to raid American shipping in the Monterey Bay area, arriving within 100 miles of its destination on 18 December.

20 miles off Cypress Point, Monterey Peninsula, California. After 1415, I-23 battle-surfaced on the Richfield Oil Company's 6,771-ton tanker SS Agwiworld at 37N, 122W, firing a total of 14 shells, but missed the zigzagging target in rough seas. The Agwiworld then escaped to safety.

On December 24, 1941 I-23 attacked the SS Dorothy Phillips, a cargo ship, off Monterey. The attack damaged the rudder and Dorothy Phillips ran aground.

On 25 December I-23 departed from the West Coast for the Palmyra Island area.

=== Second attack on Pearl Harbor ===
In January, 1942, the IJN General Staff began to develop a plan to raid Pearl Harbor a second time. The objective of the attack was to disrupt ship repair activities.

At Kwajalein, five submarines were selected to participate in Operation K-1, the planned second air attack on Pearl Harbor. The objective of the attack was to bomb the Ten-Ten Dock and disrupt ship repair activities. The plan called for the airplanes to depart from the Marshall Islands and fly to French Frigate Shoals in the Hawaiian Islands (500 miles WNW of Pearl Harbor) where they were to be refueled by I-class submarines. I-9 was assigned to take up station midway between Wotje and the Shoal and act as a radio beacon for two Kawanishi H8K1 "Emily" flying boat bombers. I-19, I-15 and I-26 were to refuel the flying boats at the Shoal. I-23 was then to standby 10 miles south of Pearl Harbor, providing weather reports and acting in an air-sea rescue capacity.

As part of the mission, after sundown on 1 January, I-23 attempted to conduct periscope reconnaissance off Palmyra Island, but came under gunfire. Cdr Shibata decided to withdraw the I-23 and make another try next evening. On 3 January the I-23 arrived at the Hawaiian islands, two days later departing for Kwajalein.

=== American air raid on Kwajalein ===
On 1 February 1942 Vice Admiral William F. Halsey Jr.'s Task Force 8, which include the aircraft carrier USS Enterprise, began an air raid on Kwajalein and Wotje in the Marshall Islands. Enterprise's airplanes sank a transport and damaged a light cruiser, Katori, flagship of the Sixth Sensuikan Fleet. The submarine depot ship, Yasukuni Maru, and several other important ships were also damaged during the raid.

At the time, I-23 was taking on supplies while anchored between tender, the Yasukuni Maru, and I-26. She returned fire while attempting to dump her deck cargo into the sea. After the Yasukuni Maru received a bomb hit, one of her 25-mm AA gunners was injured by bomb fragments. Her floatplane avgas tank ignited, causing a small fire. By the time the Dauntlesses of VS-6 and VB-6 arrived, all of the submarines had submerged. After the attack I-23 briefly participated in an unsuccessful pursuit and hunt of Halsey's Task Force, but later returned.

=== Loss of I-23 ===
On 24 February 1942, at 23:30 I-23 transmitted her last report from the Hawaii area. Presumed lost with all of her ninety-six sailors somewhere off the Oahu coast of Hawaii, including the Combined Fleet staff officer LtCdr Konishi Masayoshi, she was removed from the Navy List on 30 April 1942.

== See also ==
- Imperial Japanese Navy submarines

== Bibliography ==
- Milanovich, Kathrin (2021). "The IJN Submarines of the I 15 Class". In Jordan, John (ed.). Warship 2021. Oxford, UK: Osprey Publishing. pp. 29–43. ISBN 978-1-4728-4779-9.
