= List of ships sunk by Axis warships in Australian waters =

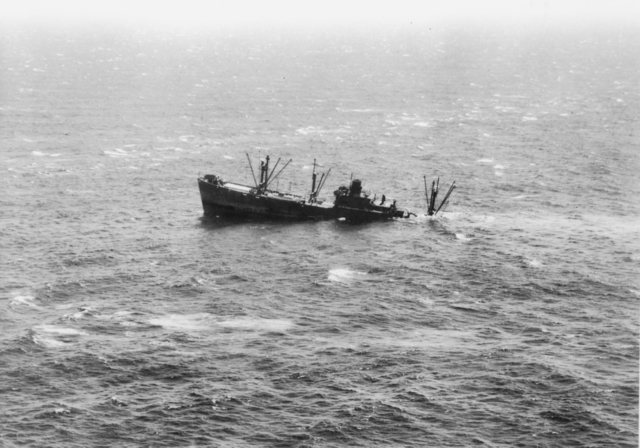
The U.S.-registered Liberty Ship Starr King sinking after being attacked near Port Macquarie on 10 February 1943.

This is a list of Allied ships sunk by Axis warships operating in Australian waters during the Second World War.

54 Axis surface raiders and submarines (both German and Japanese) carried out these attacks, sinking 53 merchant ships and three warships within the Australia Station, resulting in the deaths of over 1,751 Allied military personnel, sailors and civilians. A further 88 civilians were killed in air raids.

The definition of "Australian waters" used in this list is the area designated the Australia Station prior to the outbreak of war. This vast area consisted of the waters around Australia and eastern New Guinea, and stretching south to Antarctica. From east to west, it stretched from 170° east in the Pacific Ocean to 80° east in the Indian Ocean, and from north to south it stretched from the Equator to the Antarctic.

A full account is given in Axis naval activity in Australian waters.

== Ships sunk by surface raiders ==
The six German and three Japanese surface raiders that operated within Australian waters sank 18 ships and killed over 826 sailors.

Date	Ship	Tonnage (GRT)	Location	Sunk by	Remarks
16 Aug 1940	Notou	2,489	Noumea	Orion	
20 Aug 1940	Turakina	9,691	Tasman Sea	Orion	
7 Oct 1940	Storstad	8,998	Christmas Island	Pinguin	captured; converted to auxiliary minelayer
7 Nov 1940	Cambridge	10,846	Bass Strait	Passat	sunk by mines laid
9 Nov 1940	City of Rayville	5,883	Bass Strait	Passat	sunk by mines laid
19 Nov 1940	Nowshera	7,920	Indian Ocean	Pinguin	
20 Nov 1940	Maimoa	10,123	Indian Ocean	Pinguin	
21 Nov 1940	Port Brisbane	8,739	Indian Ocean	Pinguin	
30 Nov 1940	Port Wellington	8,303	Indian Ocean	Pinguin	
5 Dec 1940	Nimbin	1,052	Off Norah Head	Pinguin	sunk by mines laid
6 Dec 1940	Triona	4,413	Nauru	Orion, Komet	
7 Dec 1940	Vinni	5,181	Nauru	Orion, Komet	
7 Dec 1940	Komuta	3,900	Nauru	Orion, Komet	
8 Dec 1940	Triadic	6,378	Nauru	Orion, Komet	
8 Dec 1940	Triaster	6,032	Nauru	Orion, Komet	
26 Mar 1941	Millimumul	287	33 MILES EAST OF BROKEN BAY, NSW	Pinguin	sunk by mines laid
26 Jun 1941	Velebit	4,153	Indian Ocean	Kormoran	
26 Jun 1941	Mareeba	3,472	Indian Ocean	Kormoran	
26 Sep 1941	Stamatios G Embirikos	3,941	Indian Ocean	Kormoran	
19 Nov 1941	HMAS Sydney	n/a	Carnarvon, W Aust	Kormoran	both sunk in naval engagement
15 Jun 1943	Hoegh Silverdawn	7,715	W Australia	Michel	
17 Jun 1943	Ferncastle	9,940	W Australia	Michel	
9 Mar 1944	Behar	6,100	Indian Ocean	Tone	survivors massacred

== Ships sunk by submarines ==
The following table has been adapted from Appendix V of A Critical Vulnerability: The impact of the submarine threat on Australia's maritime defence 1915 - 1954 by David Stevens. Stevens' appendix lists all known Axis submarine activity in Australian waters during World War II and includes data on unsuccessful submarine attacks on Allied shipping, attacks made in Papuan and Netherlands East Indies waters and Japanese patrols in Australian waters which did not result in any attacks on Allied ships.

The 28 Japanese and German submarines that operated in Australian waters between 1942 and 1945 sank a total of 30 ships with a combined tonnage of 151,000 long tons (153,000 t); 654 people, including 200 Australian merchant seamen, were killed on board the ships attacked by submarines.

Date	Submarine	Ship	Tonnage	Location	Remarks
20/1/1942	I 159	Eidsvold	4184	Christmas Island	
1/3/1942	I 154	Modjokerto	8806	South of Christmas Island	
1/3/1942	I 2	Parigi	1172	Off Fremantle	
3/3/1942	I 1	Siantar	8867	200 nm NW of Shark Bay	
4/3/1942	I 7	Le Maire	3271	NW of Cocos Islands	
5/5/1942	I 21	John Adams	7180	120 nm SW of Noumea	
7/5/1942	I 21	Chloe	4641	35 nm from Nouméa	
31/5/1942	M 24	HMAS Kuttabul	448	Sydney Harbour	Midget launched from I 24
3/6/1942	I 24	Iron Chieftain	481	27 nm E of Sydney	
4/6/1942	I 27	Iron Crown	3353	40 nm SW of Gabo Island	
12/6/1942	I 21	Guatemala	5527	40 nm NE of Sydney	Straggling from a convoy
20/7/1942	I 11	George S. Livanos	4883	15 nm E of Jervis Bay	
21/7/1942	I 11	Coast Farmer	3290	25 nm E of Jervis Bay	
22/7/1942	I 11	William Dawes	7176	15 nm E of Tathra Head	
24/7/1942	I 175	Murada	3345	85 nm NE of Newcastle	Torpedoed/undamaged (Wrongly claimed as sunk by I-175's captain, it was badly damaged, but not sunk, that day).
25/7/1942	I 175	Cagou	2795	NE of Sydney	
25/7/1942	I 169	Tjinegara	9227	92 nm SE of Nouméa	
30/8/1942	I 175	Dureenbee	233	20 nm off Moruya	Trawler
18/1/1943	I 21	Kalingo	2047	110 nm E of Sydney	
18/1/1943	I 21	Mobilube	10222	60 nm E of Sydney	Tanker
22/1/1943	I 21	Peter H. Burnett	7176	420 nm E of Sydney	
29/1/1943	I 10	Samuel Gompers	7176	500 nm NE of Brisbane	
30/1/1943	I 21	Giang Ann	?	30 nm E of Newcastle	
8/2/1943	I 21	SS Iron Knight	4812	21 nm off Montague Island	Sunk while sailing in an escorted convoy, 36 of complement of 50 lost
10/2/1943	I 21	Starr King	7176	150 nm E of Sydney	
11/4/1943	I 26	Recina	4732	20 nm off Cape Howe	Sunk while sailing in an escorted convoy
24/4/1943	I 26	Kowarra	2125	160 nm N of Brisbane	
26/4/1943	I 177	Limerick	8724	20 nm SE of Cape Byron	
27/4/1943	I 178	Lydia M. Childs	7176	90 nm E of Newcastle	
29/4/1943	I 180	Wollongbar II	2239	Off Crescent Head	
5/5/1943	I 180	Fingal	2137	Off Nambucca Heads	
14/5/1943	I 177	Australian Hospital Ship Centaur	3222	24 nm ENE of Point Lookout	Hospital ship
16/6/1943	I 174	Portmar	5551	250 nm NE of Sydney	Sunk while sailing in an escorted convoy
22/6/1943	I 17	Stanvac Manila	10245	Off Nouméa	Two PT boats also destroyed
24/12/1944	U 862	SS Robert J. Walker	7180	Off Moruya, two of crew lost	The only ship sunk during the war by a German U-boat in the Pacific Ocean. Attack on ship, sinking and rescue of crew described in the Australian Official Histories of the Second World War. (Liberty ship)
6/2/1945	U 862	SS Peter Silvester	7176	820 nm SW of Fremantle	In the Indian Ocean, 32 of crew lost (Liberty ship)

== See also ==
- Axis naval activity in Australian waters
- Axis naval activity in New Zealand waters
- List of Allied ships lost to Italian surface vessels in the Mediterranean (1940-43)
- List of Royal Australian Navy losses

== Notes ==
- Battle Surface: Japan's Submarine War Against Australia 1942-44 by David Jenkins (1992, Random House, NSW Australia) ISBN 0-09-182638-1
