= USS Corpus Christi =

Three ships of the United States Navy have been named USS Corpus Christi for the city of Corpus Christi, Texas or related areas.

- USS Corpus Christi (PF-44), was a Tacoma-class patrol frigate that served in World War II.
- USS City of Corpus Christi, is a Los Angeles-class submarine
- USNS Corpus Christi Bay (T-ARVH-1), formerly USS Albemarle, was a helicopter repair ship, from 1965 until 1974.
