= Heinrich Timm =

German commander (1910–1974)

- Born: 30 April 1910; Bremen
- Died: 12 April 1974 (aged 63); Axstedt
- Military career
- Allegiance: Nazi Germany; West Germany
- Branch: Kriegsmarine; German Navy
- Service years: 1933–45; 1956–66
- Rank: Korvettenkapitän (Kriegsmarine); Fregattenkapitän (Bundesmarine)
- Commands: U-251; U-862
- Conflicts: World War II
- Awards: Knight's Cross of the Iron Cross

Heinrich Timm (30 April 1910 in Bremen – 12 April 1974 in Axstedt) was a German U-boat commander in World War II and recipient of the Knight's Cross of the Iron Cross. In 1944-45 Timm commanded the U-862, the only U-boat to conduct a patrol in the Pacific Ocean during World War II.

== Naval career ==
Timm commanded nine war patrols into the Arctic Sea, on the prowl against the arctic convoys of World War II to the northern seaports of the Soviet Union. There, the U-251 sank two merchant ships: The first one, on 3 May 1942, was the 6,135-ton British merchant ship SS Jutland of Convoy PQ-15, while the second, in July 1942, was the American cargo ship El Capitan from the ill-fated Convoy PQ 17. Timm also took part in "Operation Wunderland" in the Kara Sea, surfacing close to Uyedineniya Island and destroying a Soviet weather station with cannon fire from his deck gun.

When the U-251 was decommissioned to be overhauled in June 1943, Timm and his crew were sent to take over the new Type IXD2 U-boat U-862, and after training missions in the Baltic Sea, they sailed her to the Indian Ocean during mid-1944 to join the Monsun Gruppe of U-boats prowling in the Indian Ocean and farther east, from Japanese-held naval bases.

The U-862 sank five merchantmen and also shot down a British Catalina flying boat of No. 265 Squadron RAF while en route. On 5 July, Timm received notification of his promotion to Korvettenkapitän.

Then, while patrolling off eastern Australia in late 1944 and early 1945, Timm sank two American Liberty ship merchantmen. In January 1945, the U-862 entered and departed from the Port of Napier, New Zealand, undetected. This later gave rise to the widely circulated post-war "tall tale" that Timm led members of his crew ashore near Napier in order to milk some cows to supplement their meagre rations.

After the surrender of Nazi Germany on May 7, 1945, all of the German U-boat crews in the Far East were interned by the Japanese Empire at Singapore and Batu Pahat, and their U-boats were confiscated by the Imperial Japanese Navy. The U-862 was commissioned into the Imperial Japanese Navy as the I-502.

Korvettenkapitän Timm and his crewmen were still being held in Singapore when units of the Royal Navy arrived there on September 12, 1945. The German seamen were taken into custody by the British, and they were taken to Great Britain during July 1946, and then still held prisoner, even though Nazi Germany had surrendered over a year earlier.

Timm was finally released from British captivity in April 1948.

=== Timm's Postwar Activities ===
Timm joined the new West German navy, the Bundesmarine, when it was established in 1956. Timm served in several positions, including that of the first commander of the West German frigate Scharnhorst. Timm finally retired from the Bundesmarine in 1966 with the rank of Fregattenkapitän.

Ships sunk
Date	Ship	Tons	Nationality
In U-251
3 May 1942	Jutland	6,153	United Kingdom
10 July 1942	El Capitan	5,255	United States
In U-862
25 July 1944	Robin Goodfellow	6,885	United States
13 August 1944	Radbury	3,614	United Kingdom
16 August 1944	Empire Lancer	7,037	United Kingdom
18 August 1944	Nairung	5,414	United Kingdom
19 August 1944	Wayfarer	5,068	United Kingdom
24 December 1944	Robert J. Walker	7,180	United States
6 February 1945	Peter Silvester	7,176	United States

== Awards ==
- Wehrmacht Long Service Award 4th Class (4 October 1937)
- Memel Medal (26 October 1939)
- Sudetenland Medal (1 October 1938)
- Iron Cross (1939)
  - 2nd Class (10 January 1940)
  - 1st Class (16 May 1940)
- German Cross in Gold on 12 February 1942 as Kapitänleutnant on U-251 in the 6th U-boat Flotilla
- U-boat Front Clasp (29 September 1944)
- Knight's Cross of the Iron Cross on 17 September 1944 as Korvettenkapitän and commander of U-862

== See also ==
- Axis naval activity in Australian waters
