= Axis naval activity in Australian waters =

Enemy activity in Australian waters in WWII

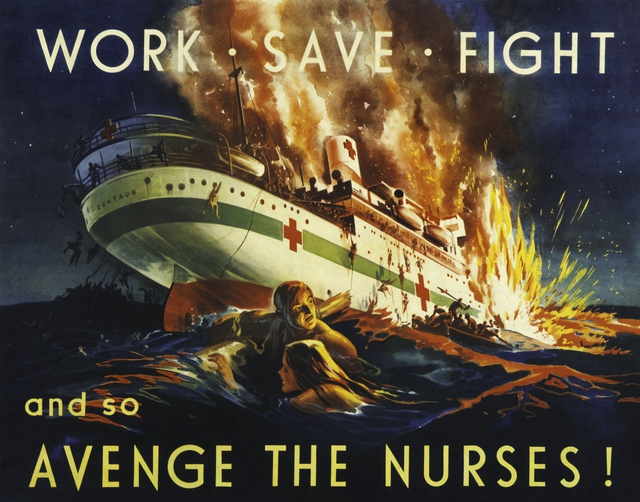
A propaganda poster calling on Australians to avenge the sinking of Australian hospital ship Centaur by Japanese submarine I-177 in May 1943.

There was considerable Axis naval activity in Australian waters during the Second World War, despite Australia being remote from the main battlefronts. German and Japanese warships and submarines entered Australian waters between 1940 and 1945 and attacked ships, ports and other targets. Among the best-known attacks are the sinking of HMAS Sydney by a German raider in November 1941, the bombing of Darwin by Japanese naval aircraft in February 1942, and the Japanese midget submarine attack on Sydney Harbour in May 1942. About 40 Allied merchant ships were damaged or sunk off the Australian coast by surface raiders, submarines and mines. Japanese submarines also shelled three Australian ports and submarine-based aircraft flew over several Australian capital cities.

The Axis threat to Australia developed gradually and until 1942 was limited to sporadic attacks by German armed merchantmen. The level of Axis naval activity peaked in the first half of 1942 when Japanese submarines conducted anti-shipping patrols off Australia's coast, and Japanese naval aviation attacked several towns in northern Australia. The Japanese submarine offensive against Australia was renewed in the first half of 1943 but was broken off as the Allies pushed the Japanese onto the defensive. Few Axis naval vessels operated in Australian waters in 1944 and 1945, and those that did had only a limited impact.

Due to the episodic nature of the Axis attacks and the relatively small number of ships and submarines committed, Germany and Japan were not successful in disrupting Australian shipping. While the Allies were forced to deploy substantial assets to defend shipping in Australian waters, this did not have a significant impact on the Australian war effort or American-led operations in the South West Pacific Area.

== Australia Station and Australian defences ==
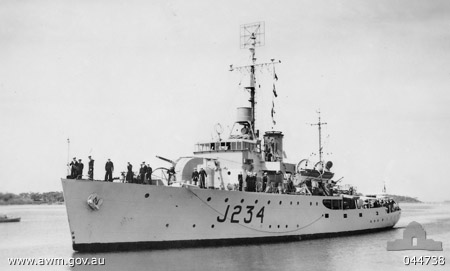
A Bathurst-class corvette. This class of ship was commonly used to escort convoys in Australian waters.

The maritime approaches to Australia were designated the Australia Station prior to the outbreak of war. This vast area consisted of the waters around Australia and eastern New Guinea, and stretching south to Antarctica. From east to west, it stretched from 170° east in the Pacific Ocean to 80° east in the Indian Ocean, and from north to south it stretched from the Equator to the Antarctic. While the eastern half of New Guinea was an Australian colonial possession during the Second World War and fell within the Australia Station, the Japanese operations in these waters formed part of the New Guinea and Solomon Islands campaigns and were not directed at Australia.

The defence of the Australia Station was the Royal Australian Navy's (RAN) main concern throughout the war. Although RAN ships frequently served outside Australian waters, escort vessels and minesweepers were available to protect shipping in the Australia Station at all times. These escorts were supported by a small number of larger warships, such as cruisers and armed merchant cruisers, for protection against surface raiders. Important military shipping movements were escorted from the start of the war, but convoys were not instituted in Australian waters until June 1942. The Australian naval authorities did, however, close ports to shipping at various times following real or suspected sightings of enemy warships or mines prior to June 1942.

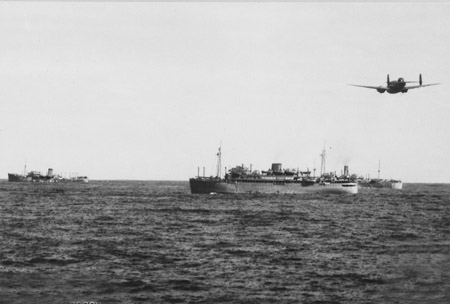
A troop convoy escorted by a RAAF Lockheed Hudson aircraft

The Royal Australian Air Force (RAAF) was also responsible for the protection of shipping within the Australia Station. Throughout the war, RAAF aircraft escorted convoys and conducted reconnaissance and anti-submarine patrols from bases around Australia. The main types of aircraft used for maritime patrol were Avro Ansons, Bristol Beauforts, Consolidated PBY Catalinas and Lockheed Hudsons. Ansons were the main type available during the first years of the war, but were not well suited to this task due to their short range and modest weapon-carrying capacity. The introduction of Beauforts and Hudsons considerably improved the RAAF's maritime patrol and anti-submarine capacities. A network of airfields along the Australian coastline was established over the course of the war to support the RAAF's maritime patrol operations. Anti-submarine work required intensive efforts by the RAAF aircrew. For instance, aircraft needed to sweep the entrance to harbours before convoys departed and then constantly patrol over them while they were at sea.

The Allied naval forces assigned to the Australia Station were considerably increased following Japan's entry into the war in December 1941 and the beginning of the United States military build-up in Australia. These naval forces were supported by a large increase in the RAAF's maritime patrol force and the arrival of United States Navy (USN) patrol aircraft. Following the initial Japanese submarine attacks, a convoy system was instituted between Australian ports, and by the end of the war the RAAF and RAN had escorted over 1,100 convoys along the Australian coastline. As the battlefront moved to the north and attacks in Australian waters became less frequent, the number of ships and aircraft assigned to shipping protection duties within the Australia Station was considerably reduced.

In addition to the air and naval forces assigned to protect shipping in Australian waters, fixed defences were constructed to protect the major Australian ports. The Australian Army was responsible for developing and manning coastal defences to protect ports from attacks by enemy surface raiders. These defences commonly consisted of a number of fixed guns defended by anti-aircraft guns and infantry. The Army's coastal defences were considerably expanded as the threat to Australia increased between 1940 and 1942, and reached their peak in 1944. The RAN was responsible for developing and manning harbour defences in Australia's main ports. These defences consisted of fixed anti-submarine booms and mines supported by small patrol craft, and were also greatly expanded as the threat to Australia increased. The RAN also laid defensive minefields in Australian waters from August 1941.

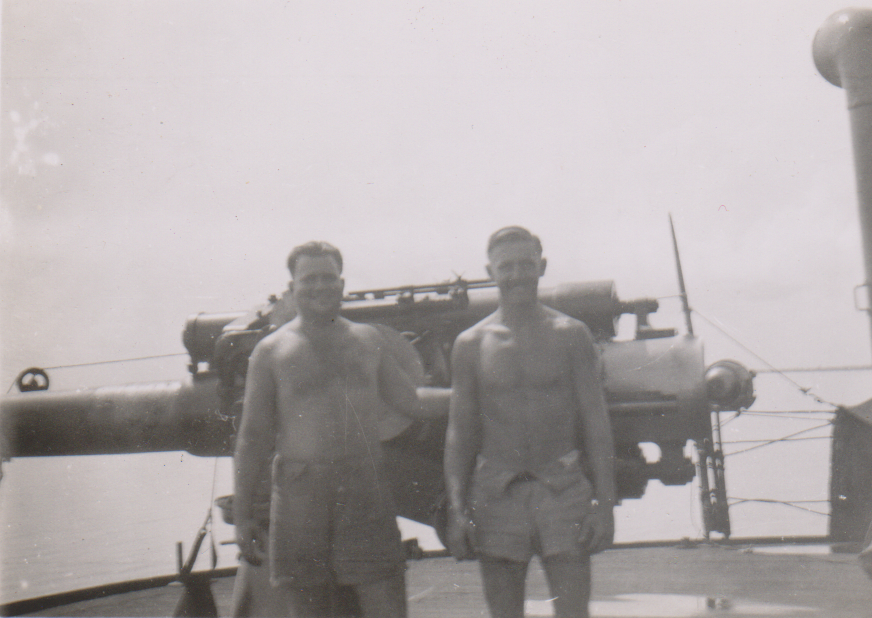
Two merchant navy seamen standing in front of a gun fitted to their ship

The cargo ships that operated in Australian waters during World War II were mostly crewed by civilians, with the Australian vessels and their crews being organised loosely as the Australian Merchant Navy. These sailors endured considerable risks in the course of their employment. Most of the cargo ships were unarmed, though some were fitted with guns. The guns on the ships that were armed were operated by Defensively Equipped Merchant Ship personnel provided by the RAN and members of the ship's crew. Merchant seaman received war risk bonuses that were increased over the course of the war as a result of advocacy from unions. This led to them receiving approximately equal pay and allowances to members of the RAN. A 1989 inquiry undertaken by the Repatriation Commission found that merchant mariners were exposed to greater risks than many members of the RAN as they more frequently operated in dangerous waters and their ships were not designed to survive attacks. The support provided to civilian mariners who survived the loss of their ship during the war was also generally inferior to that provided to naval personnel.

While the naval and air forces available for the protection of shipping in Australian waters were never adequate to defeat a heavy or coordinated attack, they proved sufficient to mount defensive patrols against the sporadic and generally cautious attacks mounted by the Axis navies during the war.

== 1939–1941 ==
=== German surface raiders in 1940 ===
German surface raiders operated in the western Indian Ocean in 1939 and early 1940, and began to enter Australian waters in second half of 1940. The German surface raider Orion was the first Axis warship to operate in Australian waters during World War II. After operating off the northern tip of New Zealand and the South Pacific, Orion entered Australian waters in the Coral Sea in August 1940 and reached a point 120 nmi (140 mi; 220 km) north-east of Brisbane on 11 August. She then headed east and operated off New Caledonia before proceeding south into the Tasman Sea, sinking the merchant ship Notou south-west of Noumea on 16 August and the British merchant ship Turakina in the Tasman Sea four days later. Orion sailed south-west after sinking Turakina, passing south of Tasmania, and operated without success in the Great Australian Bight in early September. Orion laid four dummy mines off Albany, Western Australia on 2 September and departed to the south-west after being spotted by an Australian aircraft the next day. After unsuccessfully patrolling in the Southern Ocean, Orion sailed for the Japanese-controlled Marshall Islands to refuel, arriving there on 10 October.

German attacks in Western Pacific, December 1940 to January 1941

Pinguin was the next raider to enter Australian waters. She entered the Indian Ocean from the South Atlantic in August 1940 and arrived off Western Australia in October. On 7 October Pinguin captured the 8,998 long tons (9,142 t) Norwegian tanker Storstad which was sailing from Borneo to Melbourne. A German prize crew took over Storstad and mines were transferred to her from Pinguin. The two ships then sailed to the east. Pinguin laid mines off the New South Wales coast between Sydney and Newcastle on the night of 28 October, with the two vessels then departing for Tasmanian waters. Pinguin laid two minefields off Hobart on 31 October and 1 November, and over the period 29–31 October Storstad laid mines in Banks Strait off the north-east corner of Tasmania and off Wilson's Promontory and Cape Otway on the Victorian coast. Pinguin also laid further mines in Spencer Gulf off Adelaide in South Australia in the first week of November. The two ships then sailed west for the Indian Ocean. Pinguin and Storstad were not detected during their operations off Australia's eastern and southern coasts. Mines laid by Storstad sank the cargo ship Cambridge off Wilsons Promontory and the American City of Rayville off Cape Otway on 8 and 9 November, and the mines laid off Sydney by Pinguin sank the coastal steamer Nimbin. The British steamer Hertford was also damaged after striking a mine at the entrance to Spencer Gulf. Pinguin sank another three merchant ships in the Indian Ocean during November.

On 7 December 1940, the German raiders Orion and Komet arrived off the Australian protectorate of Nauru. During the next 48 hours, they sank four merchant ships. Heavily loaded with survivors from their victims, the raiders departed for Emirau Island where they unloaded the prisoners. After an unsuccessful attempt to lay mines off Rabaul on 24 December, Komet made a second attack on Nauru on 27 December and shelled the island's phosphate plant and dock facilities. This was the last Axis naval attack in Australian waters until November 1941.

The raid on Nauru led to serious concerns in Australia about the supply of phosphates from there and nearby Ocean Island, though the lack of availability of warships allowed only limited response to threats to the isolated islands. Some warships were redeployed, and it was decided to install six-inch naval guns on the islands despite provisions of the mandate prohibiting fortifications. Due to shortages of these guns the intended defences were reduced to two field guns for each island. The most serious effect of the raid was the fall in phosphate output, though decisions made as early as 1938 to increase stockpiles of raw rock in Australia mitigated the decline. Another consequence was the institution of the first Trans-Tasman commercial convoys, with Convoy VK.1 composed of Empire Star, Port Chalmers, Empress of Russia, and Maunganui leaving Sydney 30 December 1940 for Auckland escorted by the light cruiser HMNZS Achilles.

=== German surface raiders in 1941 ===
Following the raids on Nauru, Komet and Orion sailed for the Indian Ocean, passing through the Southern Ocean well to the south of Australia in February and March 1941 respectively. Komet re-entered the Australia Station in April en route to New Zealand, and Atlantis sailed east through the southern extreme of the Australia Station in August. Until November, the only casualties from Axis ships on the Australia Station in 1941 were caused by mines laid by Pinguin in 1940. The small trawler Millimumul was sunk with the loss of seven lives after striking a mine off the New South Wales coast on 26 March 1941, and two ratings from a mine disposal party were killed while attempting to defuse a mine which had washed ashore in South Australia on 14 July.

On 19 November 1941, the Australian light cruiser HMAS Sydney—which had been highly successful in the Battle of the Mediterranean—encountered the disguised German raider Kormoran, approximately 150 mi (130 nmi; 240 km) south west of Carnarvon, Western Australia. Sydney intercepted Kormoran and demanded that she prove her assumed identity as the Dutch freighter Straat Malakka. During the interception, Sydney's captain brought his ship dangerously close to Kormoran. As a result, when Kormoran was unable to prove her identity and avoid a battle she had little hope of surviving, the raider was able to use all her weaponry against Sydney. In the resulting battle, Kormoran and Sydney were both crippled, with Sydney sinking with the loss of all her 645 crew and 78 of Kormoran's crew being either killed in the battle or dying before they could be rescued by passing ships.

Kormoran was the only Axis ship to conduct attacks in Australian waters during 1941 and the last Axis surface raider to enter Australian waters until 1943. There is no evidence to support claims that a Japanese submarine participated in the sinking of HMAS Sydney. The only German ship to enter the Australia Station during 1942 was the blockade runner and supply ship Ramses, which was sunk by the light cruisers HMAS Adelaide and HNLMS Jacob van Heemskerk on 26 November, shortly after Ramses left Batavia in the Japanese-occupied Dutch East Indies bound for France. All of Ramses' crew survived the sinking and were taken prisoner.

== 1942 ==
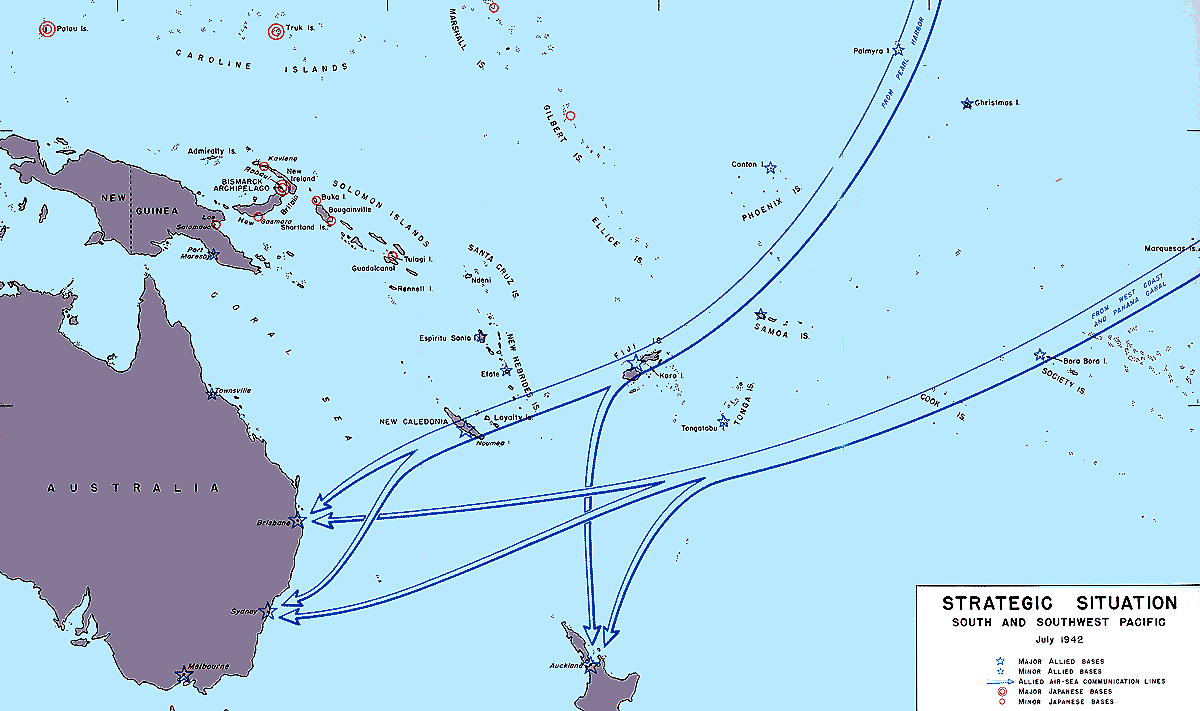
The Allied shipping lines between the U.S. and Australia and New Zealand in July 1942. The Australian end of these shipping lines was targeted by Japanese submarines between May and August 1942.

The naval threat to Australia increased dramatically following the outbreak of war in the Pacific. During the first half of 1942, the Japanese mounted a sustained campaign in Australian waters, with Japanese submarines attacking shipping and aircraft carriers conducting a devastating attack on the strategic port of Darwin. In response to these attacks the Allies increased the resources allocated to protecting shipping in Australian waters.

=== Initial Japanese submarine patrols (January–March 1942) ===
The first Japanese submarines to enter Australian waters were I-121, I-122, I-123 and I-124, from the Imperial Japanese Navy's (IJN's) Submarine Squadron 6. Acting in support of the Japanese conquest of the Netherlands East Indies, these boats laid minefields in the approaches to Darwin and in the Torres Strait between 12 and 18 January 1942. The mines did not sink or damage any Allied ships.

After completing their mine laying missions the four submarines took station off Darwin to provide the Japanese fleet with warning of Allied naval movements. On 20 January the Australian Bathurst-class corvettes HMAS Deloraine, Katoomba and Lithgow sank I-124 near Darwin. This is the only full-sized submarine that was confirmed to have been sunk by the RAN in Australian waters during World War II. Being the first accessible ocean-going IJN submarine lost after the attack on Pearl Harbor, USN divers attempted to enter I-124 in order to obtain its code books, but were unsuccessful.

Following the conquest of the western Pacific the Japanese made a number of reconnaissance patrols into Australian waters. The submarines (I-1, I-2 and I-3) operated off Western Australia in March 1942, sinking the merchant ships Parigi and Siantar on 1 and 3 March respectively. In addition, I-25 conducted a reconnaissance patrol down the Australian east coast in February and March. During this patrol Nobuo Fujita from the I-25 flew a Yokosuka E14Y1 floatplane over Sydney (17 February), Melbourne (26 February) and Hobart (1 March). Following these reconnaissance operations, I-25 sailed for New Zealand and conducted overflights of Wellington and Auckland on 8 and 13 March respectively.

=== Japanese naval aviation attacks (February 1942 – November 1943) ===
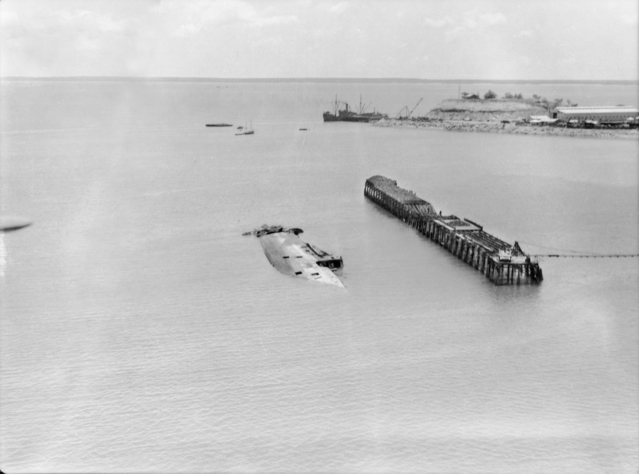
A sunken ship and burnt-out wharf in Darwin Harbour following the first Japanese air raid

The bombing of Darwin on 19 February 1942, was the heaviest single attack by the IJN against mainland Australia. On 19 February, four Japanese aircraft carriers (Akagi, Kaga, Hiryū and Sōryū) launched a total of 188 aircraft from a position in the Timor Sea. The carriers were escorted by four cruisers and nine destroyers. The naval aircraft inflicted heavy damage on Darwin and sank nine ships. A raid conducted by 54 land-based bombers later the same day caused further damage to the town and RAAF Base Darwin and the destruction of 20 Allied military aircraft. Allied casualties were 236 killed and between 300 and 400 wounded, the majority of whom were non-Australian Allied sailors. Four Japanese aircraft were confirmed to have been destroyed by Darwin's defenders.

The bombing of Darwin was the first of many Japanese naval aviation attacks against targets in Australia. The carriers Shōhō, Shōkaku and Zuikaku—which escorted the invasion force dispatched against Port Moresby in May 1942—had the secondary role of attacking Allied bases in northern Queensland once Port Moresby was secured. These attacks did not occur, however, as the landings at Port Moresby were cancelled when the Japanese carrier force was mauled in the Battle of the Coral Sea.

Japanese aircraft made almost 100 raids, most of them small, against northern Australia during 1942 and 1943. Land-based IJN aircraft took part in many of the 63 raids on Darwin which followed the initial attack. The town of Broome in Western Australia experienced a devastating attack by IJN fighters on 3 March 1942, in which at least 88 people were killed. Long-range seaplanes operating from bases in the Solomon Islands made a number of small attacks on towns in Queensland.

Japanese naval aircraft operating from land bases also harassed coastal shipping in Australia's northern waters during 1942 and 1943. On 15 December 1942, four sailors were killed when the merchant ship Period was attacked off Cape Wessel in the Northern Territory. The small general purpose vessel HMAS Patricia Cam was sunk by a Japanese floatplane near the Wessel Islands on 22 January 1943 with the loss of nine sailors and civilians. Another civilian sailor was killed when the merchant ship Islander was attacked by a floatplane during May 1943.

=== Attacks on Sydney and Newcastle (May–June 1942) ===
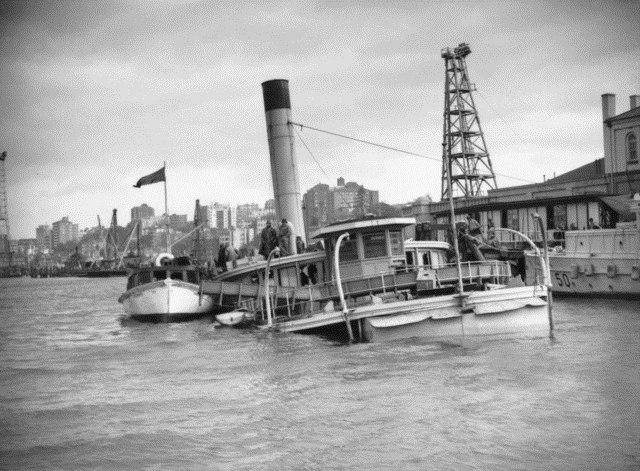
HMAS Kuttabul following the attack on Sydney

In March 1942, the Japanese military adopted a strategy of isolating Australia from the United States, which involved capturing Port Moresby in New Guinea, the Solomon Islands, Fiji, Samoa and New Caledonia. This plan was frustrated by the Japanese defeat in the Battle of the Coral Sea and was postponed indefinitely after the Battle of Midway.

On 27 April 1942, the submarines I-21 and I-29 left the major Japanese naval base at Truk Lagoon in the Japanese territory of the Caroline Islands to conduct reconnaissance patrols of Allied ports in the South Pacific. The goal of these patrols was to find a suitable target for a force of midget submarines, designated the Eastern Detachment of the Second Special Attack Flotilla, which was available in the Pacific. I-29 entered Australian waters in May and made an unsuccessful attack on the neutral Soviet freighter Wellen off Newcastle on 16 May. I-29's floatplane overflew Sydney on 23 May 1942, finding a large number of major Allied warships in Sydney Harbour. I-21 reconnoitred Suva in Fiji and Auckland in New Zealand in late May and did not find worthwhile concentrations of shipping in either port.

On 18 May, the Eastern Detachment of the Second Special Attack Flotilla left Truk Lagoon under the command of Captain Hankyu Sasaki. Sasaki's force comprised I-22, I-24 and I-27. Each submarine was carrying a midget submarine. After the intelligence gathered by I-21 and I-29 was assessed, the three submarines were ordered on 24 May to attack Sydney. The three submarines of the Eastern Detachment rendezvoused with I-21 and I-29 35 mi (30 nmi; 56 km) off Sydney on 29 May. In the early hours of 30 May, I-21's floatplane conducted a reconnaissance flight over Sydney Harbour that confirmed the concentration of Allied shipping sighted by I-29's floatplane was still present and remained a worthwhile target.

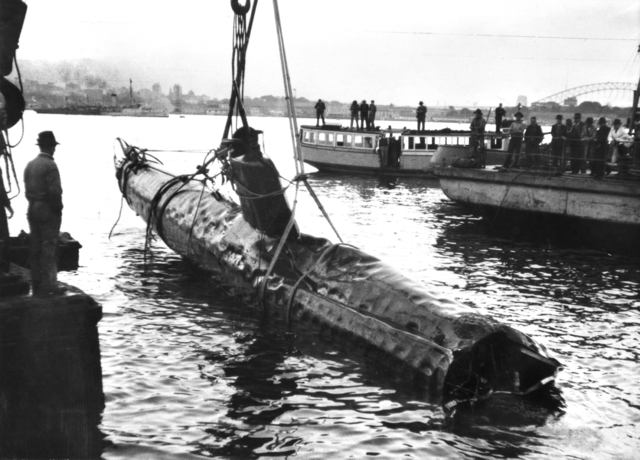
A Japanese midget submarine being raised from Sydney Harbour

On the night of 31 May, three midget submarines were launched from the Japanese force outside the Sydney Heads. Two of the submarines (Midget No. 22 and Midget A, also known as Midget 24) successfully penetrated the incomplete Sydney Harbour defences. Only Midget A actually attacked Allied shipping in the harbour, firing two torpedoes at the American heavy cruiser USS Chicago. These torpedoes missed Chicago but sank the depot ship HMAS Kuttabul, killing 21 seamen on board, and seriously damaged the Dutch submarine K IX. All of the Japanese midget submarines were lost. Midget No. 22 and Midget No. 27 were destroyed by the Australian defenders and Midget A was scuttled by her crew after leaving the harbour.

Following this raid, the Japanese submarine force operated off Sydney and Newcastle and sank the coaster Iron Chieftain near Sydney on 3 June. On the night of 8 June, I-24 bombarded the eastern suburbs of Sydney and I-21 shelled Newcastle. Fort Scratchley at Newcastle returned fire, but did not hit I-21. These bombardments did not cause any casualties or serious damage, but generated concern over further attacks against the east coast. Following the attacks on shipping in the Sydney region, the RAN instituted convoys between Brisbane and Adelaide. All ships of over 1,200 long tons (1,200 t) and with speeds of less than 12 kn (14 mph; 22 km/h) were required to sail in convoy when travelling between cities on the east coast. The Japanese submarine force left Australian waters in late June 1942 having sunk a further two merchant ships. The small number of sinkings achieved by the five Japanese submarines sent against the Australian east coast in May and June represented a poor return for the commitment of so many submarines.

=== Further Japanese submarine patrols (July–August 1942) ===
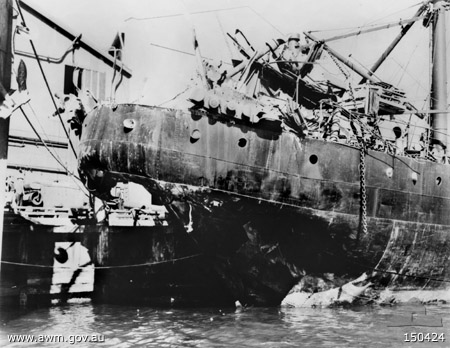
Damage to the merchant ship SS Allara after she was torpedoed off Newcastle in July 1942

The Australian authorities received only a brief break in the submarine threat. In July 1942, three submarines (I-11, I-174 and I-175) from Submarine Squadron 3 commenced operations off the East Coast. These submarines sank five ships (including the small fishing trawler Dureenbee) and damaged several others during July and August. In addition, I-32 conducted a patrol off the southern coast of Australia while en route from New Caledonia to Penang, though it did not sink any ships in this area. Following the withdrawal of this force in August, no further submarine attacks were made against Australia until January 1943.

Japanese submarines sank 17 ships in Australian waters in 1942, 14 of which were near the Australian coast. This offensive did not have a serious impact on the Allied war effort in the South West Pacific or the Australian economy. Nevertheless, by forcing ships sailing along the east coast to travel in convoy the Japanese submarines reduced the efficiency of Australian coastal shipping. This translated into between 7.5% and 22% less tonnage being transported between Australian ports each month (no accurate figures are available and the estimated figure varied between months). The convoys were effective with no ship travelling as part of a convoy being sunk in Australian waters during 1942.

== 1943 ==
=== East coast submarine patrols (January–June 1943) ===
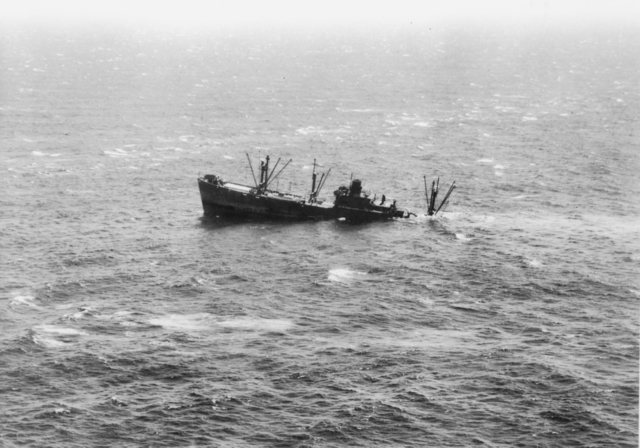
The U.S.-registered Liberty ship Starr King sinking after being attacked near Port Macquarie on 10 February 1943

Japanese submarine operations against Australia in 1943 began when I-10 and I-21 sailed from Rabaul on 7 January to reconnoitre the Nouméa and Sydney areas respectively. I-21 arrived off New South Wales just over a week later. It operated along the east coast until late February, sinking six ships. This was the most successful submarine patrol conducted in Australian waters during World War II. I-21's floatplane conducted a successful reconnaissance of Sydney Harbour on 19 February.

I-6 and I-26 entered Australian waters in March. I-6 laid nine German-supplied acoustic mines in the approaches to Brisbane. This minefield was discovered by the sloop HMAS Swan and neutralised before any ships were sunk. Although I-6 returned to Rabaul after laying her mines, the Japanese submarine force in Australian waters was expanded in April when I-11, I-177, I-178 and I-180 of Submarine Squadron 3 arrived off the east coast and joined I-26. This force sought to attack reinforcement and supply convoys travelling between Australia and New Guinea.

As the Japanese force was too small to cut off all traffic between Australia and New Guinea, the squadron commander widely dispersed his submarines between the Torres Strait and Wilson's Promontory with the goal of tying down as many Allied ships and aircraft as possible. This offensive continued until June, and the five Japanese submarines sank nine ships and damaged several others. In contrast to 1942, five of the ships sunk off the Australian east coast were travelling in escorted convoys at the time they were attacked. The convoy escorts did not detect any submarines before they launched their attacks or succeed in counter-attacking these submarines. The last attack by a Japanese submarine off the east coast of Australia was made by I-174 on 16 June 1943 when she sank the merchant ship Portmar and damaged U.S. Landing Ship Tank LST-469 as they were travelling in Convoy GP55 off the New South Wales north coast. The historian Geoff Crowhurst believes that RAAF aircraft searching for I-174 probably sank I-178 during the early hours of 18 June, but the cause of this submarine's loss during a patrol off eastern Australia has not been confirmed.

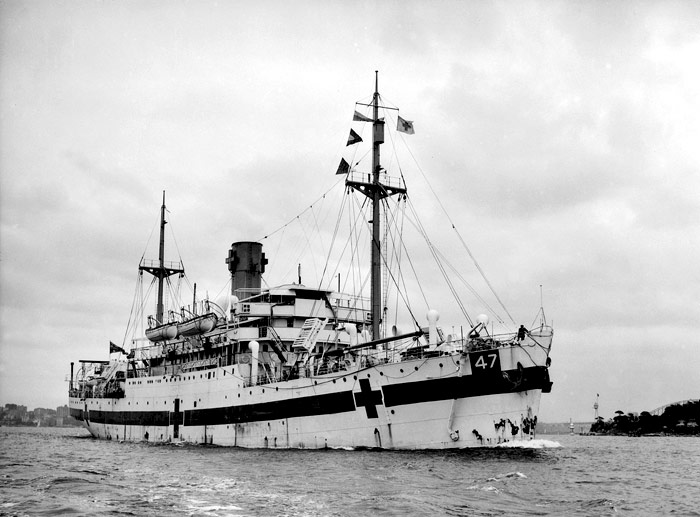
AHS Centaur

The single greatest loss of life resulting from a submarine attack in Australian waters occurred in the early hours of 14 May when I-177 torpedoed and sank the Australian hospital ship Centaur off Point Lookout, Queensland. After being hit by a single torpedo, Centaur sank in less than three minutes with the loss of 268 lives. While hospital ships were legally protected against attack under the terms of the Geneva Conventions, it is unclear whether Commander Hajime Nakagawa of I-177 was aware that Centaur was a hospital ship. She was clearly marked with a red cross and was fully illuminated, but the light conditions at the time may have resulted in Nakagawa not being aware of Centaur's status, making her sinking a tragic accident. Nakagawa had a poor record as a submarine captain and was later convicted of machine gunning the survivors of a British merchant ship, SS British Chivalry, in the Indian Ocean, so it is probable that the sinking of Centaur was due to either Nakagawa's incompetence or indifference to the laws of warfare. The attack on Centaur sparked widespread public outrage in Australia.

The Japanese submarine offensive against Australia was broken off in July when the submarines were redeployed to counter Allied offensives elsewhere in the Pacific. The last two Japanese submarines to be dispatched against the Australian east coast, I-177 and I-180, were redirected to the central Solomon Islands shortly before they would have arrived off Australia in July. The Australian naval authorities were concerned about a resumption of attacks and maintained the coastal convoy system until late 1943 when it was clear that the threat had passed. Coastal convoys in waters south of Newcastle ceased on 7 December and convoys off the north-east coast and between Australia and New Guinea were abolished in February and March 1944 respectively.

=== Shelling of Port Gregory (January 1943) ===
Only a single Japanese submarine was dispatched against the Australian west coast during the first half of 1943. On 21 January, I-165 left her base at Surabaya in Japanese-occupied Java, destined for Western Australia. The submarine – under Lieutenant Commander Kennosuke Torisu – was tasked with creating a diversion to assist the evacuation of Japanese forces from Guadalcanal following their defeat there. Another submarine – I-166 – had undertaken a diversionary bombardment of the Cocos (Keeling) Islands on 25 December 1942.

After a six-day voyage southward, I-165 reached Geraldton on 27 January. Torisu sighted what he believed were lights from aircraft or a destroyer near the town and broke off his attack. I-165 instead headed north for Port Gregory a former whaling, lead and salt port. At around midnight on 28 January, the submarine's crew fired 10 rounds from her 100 mm (3.9 in) deck gun at the town. The shells appear to have completely missed Port Gregory and did not result in any damage or casualties and the raid initially went unnoticed. While gunfire was sighted by nearby coastwatchers, Allied naval authorities only learned of the attack when Torisu's battle report radio signal was intercepted and decoded a week later. As a result, the attack did not divert attention away from Guadalcanal.

I-165 returned twice to Australian waters. In September 1943, she made an uneventful reconnaissance of the north west coast. I-165 conducted another reconnaissance patrol off north western Australian between 31 May and 5 July 1944. This was the last time a Japanese submarine entered Australian waters.

=== German raider Michel (June 1943) ===
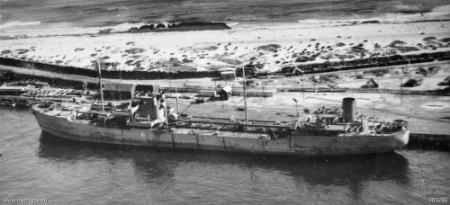
Norwegian tanker Ferncastle docked at Fremantle

Michel was the final German surface raider to enter Australian waters and the Pacific. Michel departed from Yokohama, Japan, on her second raiding cruise on 21 May 1943 and entered the Indian Ocean in June. On 15 June she sank the 7,715-long-ton (7,839 t) Norwegian tanker Høegh Silverdawn about 1,800 miles (1,600 nmi; 2,900 km) west-north-west of Fremantle while she was sailing from that port to Abadan, Iran. Michel followed up this success two days later by sinking a second Norwegian tanker, the 9,940-long-ton (10,100 t) Ferncastle, in the same area. Ferncastle was sailing from Esperance to the Persian Gulf. Following these sinkings Michel sailed well to the south of Australia and New Zealand and stayed in high latitudes until she was off the coast of Chile. On 11 September, she sank the 9,549-long-ton (9,702 t) tanker India west of Easter Island.

== 1944–1945 ==
=== Landing in the Kimberley (January 1944) ===
While the Japanese government never adopted proposals to invade Australia, a single reconnaissance landing was made on the Australian mainland. Between 17 and 20 January 1944, members of a Japanese intelligence unit named Matsu Kikan ("Pine Tree Organisation") made a reconnaissance mission to a sparsely populated area on the far north coast of the Kimberley region of Western Australia. The unit, operating from Kupang, West Timor, used a converted 35-long-ton (36 t) civilian vessel called Hiyoshi Maru and posed as a fishing crew. The mission was led by Lieutenant Susuhiko Mizuno of the Japanese Army and included another three Japanese army personnel, six Japanese naval personnel and ten young men from Timor. Their orders, from the 19th Army headquarters at Ambon, were to verify reports that the USN was building a base in the area. The Matsu Kikan personnel were also ordered to collect information which would assist any covert reconnaissance or raiding missions on the Australian mainland. They reportedly explored onshore for about two hours, and some members of the mission filmed the area using an 8 mm camera. The Matsu Kikan personnel spent the night on the boat and reconnoitred the area again the following day, before returning to Kupang. The Japanese did not sight any people or signs of recent human activity and little of military significance was learnt from the mission.

=== Japanese operations in the Indian Ocean (March 1944) ===
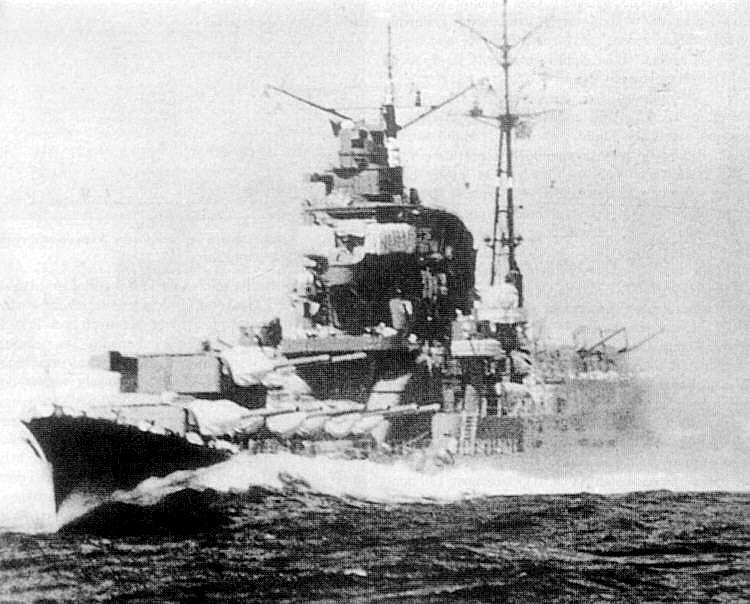
The Japanese heavy cruiser Chikuma

In February 1944, the Japanese Combined Fleet withdrew from its base at Truk and was divided between Palau and Singapore. The appearance of a powerful Japanese force at Singapore concerned the Allies, as it was feared that it could potentially conduct raids in the Indian Ocean and against Western Australia.

On 1 March, a Japanese squadron led by the heavy cruiser Aoba and consisting of the heavy cruisers Tone and Chikuma – under Vice Admiral Naomasa Sakonju – sortied from the Sunda Strait to attack Allied shipping sailing on the main route between Aden and Fremantle. The only Allied ship this squadron encountered was the British steamer Behar, which was sunk midway between Ceylon and Fremantle on 9 March. Following this attack the squadron broke off its mission and returned to Batavia as it was feared that Allied ships responding to Behar's distress signal posed an unacceptable risk. While 102 survivors from Behar were rescued by Tone, 82 of these prisoners were murdered after the cruiser arrived in Batavia on 16 March. Following the war Sakonju was executed for war crimes which included the killing of these prisoners, while the former commander of Tone, Captain Haruo Mayazumi, was sentenced to seven years imprisonment. This sortie was the last raid by Axis surface ships against the Allied lines of communication in the Indian Ocean, or elsewhere, during World War II.

While the Japanese raid into the Indian Ocean was not successful, associated Japanese shipping movements provoked a major Allied response. In early March 1944, Allied intelligence reported that two battleships escorted by destroyers had left Singapore in the direction of Surabaya and an American submarine made radar contact with two large Japanese ships in the Lombok Strait. The Australian Chiefs of Staff Committee reported to the Government on 8 March that there was a possibility that these ships could have entered the Indian Ocean to attack Fremantle. In response to this report, all ground and naval defences at Fremantle were fully activated, all shipping was ordered to leave Fremantle and several RAAF squadrons were redeployed to bases in Western Australia.

This alert proved to be a false alarm. The Japanese ships detected in the Lombok Strait were actually the light cruisers Kinu and Ōi which were covering the return of the surface raiding force from the central Indian Ocean. The alert was lifted at Fremantle on 13 March and the RAAF squadrons began returning to their bases in eastern and northern Australia on 20 March.

=== The German submarine offensive (September 1944 – January 1945) ===
On 14 September 1944, the commander of the Kriegsmarine—Großadmiral (Grand Admiral) Karl Dönitz—approved a proposal to send two Type IXD U-Boats into Australian waters with the objective of tying down Allied anti-submarine assets in a secondary theatre. The U-boats involved were drawn from the Monsun Gruppe ("Monsoon Group"), and the two selected for this operation were U-168 and U-862. An additional submarine—U-537—was added to this force at the end of September.

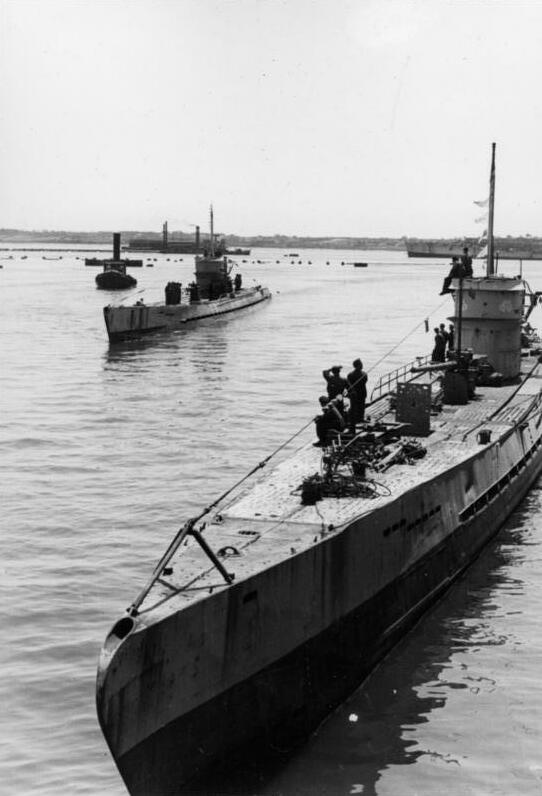
Two Type IX submarines similar to those dispatched to operate against Australia

Due to the difficulty of maintaining German submarines in Japanese bases, the boats were not ready to depart from their bases in Penang and Batavia until early October. By this time, the Allies had intercepted and decoded German and Japanese messages describing the operation and were able to vector submarines onto the German boats. The Dutch submarine Zwaardvisch sank U-168 on 6 October near Surabaya and the American submarine USS Flounder sank U-537 on 10 November near the northern end of the Lombok Strait. Due to the priority accorded to the Australian operation, U-196 was ordered to replace U-168. U-196 disappeared in the Sunda Strait some time after departing from Penang on 30 November. The cause of U-196's loss is unknown, and was likely due to either an accident or a mechanical fault.

The only surviving submarine of the force assigned to attack Australia—U-862, under Korvettenkapitän Heinrich Timm—had left Kiel in May 1944 and reached Penang on 9 September, sinking five merchantmen on the way. It departed Batavia on 18 November 1944, and arrived off the south west tip of Western Australia on 26 November. The submarine had great difficulty finding targets as the Australian naval authorities, warned of U-862's approach, had directed shipping away from the routes normally used. U-862 unsuccessfully attacked the Greek freighter Ilissos off the South Australian coast on 9 December, with bad weather spoiling both the attack and subsequent Australian efforts to locate the submarine.

Following her attack on Ilissos, U-862 continued east along the Australian coastline, and entered the Pacific after passing to the south of Tasmania. The submarine achieved its first success on this patrol when it attacked the United States-registered Liberty ship Robert J. Walker off the southern coast of New South Wales on 24 December 1944. The ship sank the following day. U-862 evaded an intensive search by Australian aircraft and warships and departed for New Zealand.

As U-862 did not find any worthwhile targets off New Zealand, the submarine's commander planned to return to Australian waters in January 1945 and operate to the north of Sydney. U-862 was ordered to break off her mission in mid-January, however, and return to Batavia. On its return voyage, the submarine sank another U.S. Liberty ship—Peter Silvester—approximately 820 nmi (940 mi; 1,520 km) southwest of Fremantle on 6 February 1945. Peter Silvester was the last Allied ship to be sunk by the Axis in the Indian Ocean during the war. U-862 arrived in Batavia in mid-February 1945 and is the only Axis ship known to have operated in Australian waters during 1945.

While Allied naval authorities were aware of the approach of the German strike force and were successful in sinking two of the four submarines dispatched, efforts to locate and sink U-862 once she reached Australian waters were continually hampered by a lack of suitable ships and aircraft and a lack of personnel trained and experienced in anti-submarine warfare. As southern Australia was thousands of kilometres behind the active combat front in South-East Asia and had not been raided for several years, there were few anti-submarine assets available in this area in late 1944 and early 1945.

== Conclusions ==
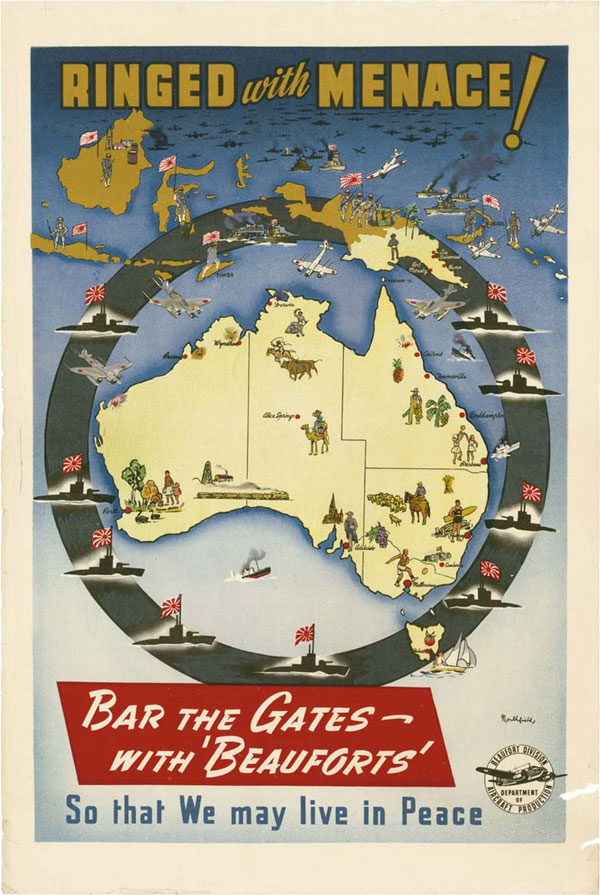
An Australian propaganda poster from 1942. The caption and design deliberately exaggerate the threat Japanese submarines posed to Australia.

=== Casualties ===
Japanese submarines and U-862 sank 30 ships in the area covered by the Australia Station during World War II. These ships had a combined tonnage of 150,984 gross register tons (427,540 m^{3}). Nine other ships were damaged by Japanese submarines. German surface raiders sank seven ships in Australian waters and captured another. Another merchant vessel was damaged by a mine.

The numbers of casualties resulting from German and Japanese attacks in Australian waters differ between sources. An unknown number of deaths and injuries were also caused by war-related accidents such as collisions between ships sailing together in convoys. The official history of Australia's role in World War II states that a total of 654 people were killed on board the vessels sunk by submarines, including approximately 200 Australian merchant seamen. It does not identify the number of people wounded in these attacks. The Seamen's Union of Australia's post-war history put the number of Australian merchant seaman killed at 386, and research by the Australian War Memorial had by 1989 identified 520 Australian merchant seaman who had died.

Evidence on military casualties is fragmentary. Fatalities on RAN ships from enemy action in Australian waters include 645 men on Sydney, 19 from Kuttabul, 7 on board ships attacked at Darwin and 5 killed on Patricia Cam. Several escort vessels also suffered fatalities that resulted from accidents. In his PhD thesis David Joseph Wilson estimated that at least 104 members of the RAAF were killed during maritime patrol and anti-submarine operations off the Australian coast, with at least 23 aircraft being destroyed.

=== Assessment ===
While the scale of the Axis naval offensive directed against Australia was small compared to other naval campaigns of the war such as the Battle of the Atlantic, they were still "the most comprehensive and widespread series of offensive operations ever conducted by an enemy against Australia". Due to the limited size of the Australian shipping industry and the importance of sea transport to the Australian economy and Allied military in the South West Pacific, even modest shipping losses had the potential to seriously damage the Allied war effort in the South West Pacific.

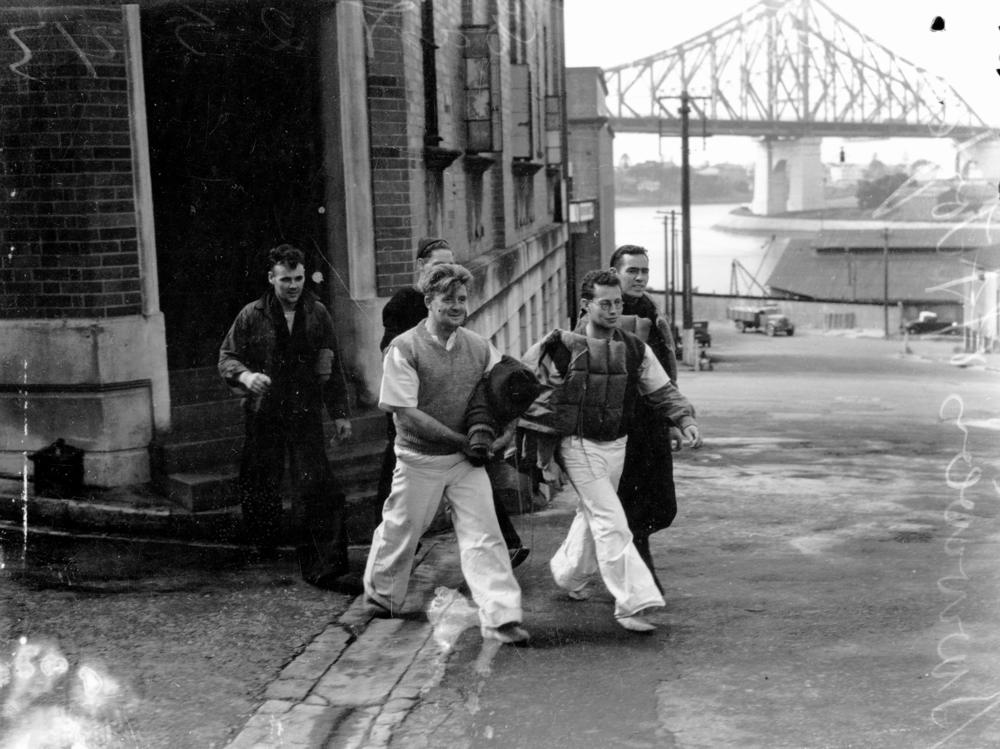
Survivors from a merchant ship sunk off the coast of Queensland in May 1943

Despite the vulnerability of the Australian shipping industry, the Axis attacks did not seriously affect the Australian or Allied war effort. While the German surface raiders which operated against Australia caused considerable disruption to merchant shipping and tied down Allied naval vessels, they did not sink many ships and only operated in Australian waters for a few short periods. The effectiveness of the Japanese submarine campaign against Australia was limited by the inadequate numbers of submarines committed and flaws in Japan's submarine doctrine. The submarines were, however, successful in forcing the Allies to devote considerable resources to protecting shipping in Australian waters between 1942 and late 1943. The institution of coastal convoys between 1942 and 1943 may have also significantly reduced the efficiency of the Australian shipping industry during this period.

The performance of the Australian and Allied forces committed to the defence of shipping on the Australia station was mixed. While the threat to Australia from Axis raiders was "anticipated and addressed", only a small proportion of the Axis ships and submarines which attacked Australia were successfully located or engaged. Several German raiders operated undetected within Australian waters in 1940 as the number of Allied warships and aircraft available were not sufficient to patrol these waters and the loss of HMAS Sydney was a high price to pay for sinking Kormoran in 1941. While the Australian authorities were quick to implement convoys in 1942 and no convoyed ship was sunk during that year, the escorts of the convoys that were attacked in 1943 were not successful in either detecting any submarines before they launched their attack or successfully counter-attacking these submarines. Factors explaining the relatively poor performance of Australian anti-submarine forces include their typically low levels of experience and training, shortages of anti-submarine warfare assets, problems with co-ordinating searches and the poor sonar conditions in the waters surrounding Australia. Nevertheless, "success in anti-submarine warfare cannot be measured simply by the total of sinkings achieved" and the Australian defenders may have successfully reduced the threat to shipping in Australian waters by making it harder for Japanese submarines to carry out attacks.

=== Remembrance ===
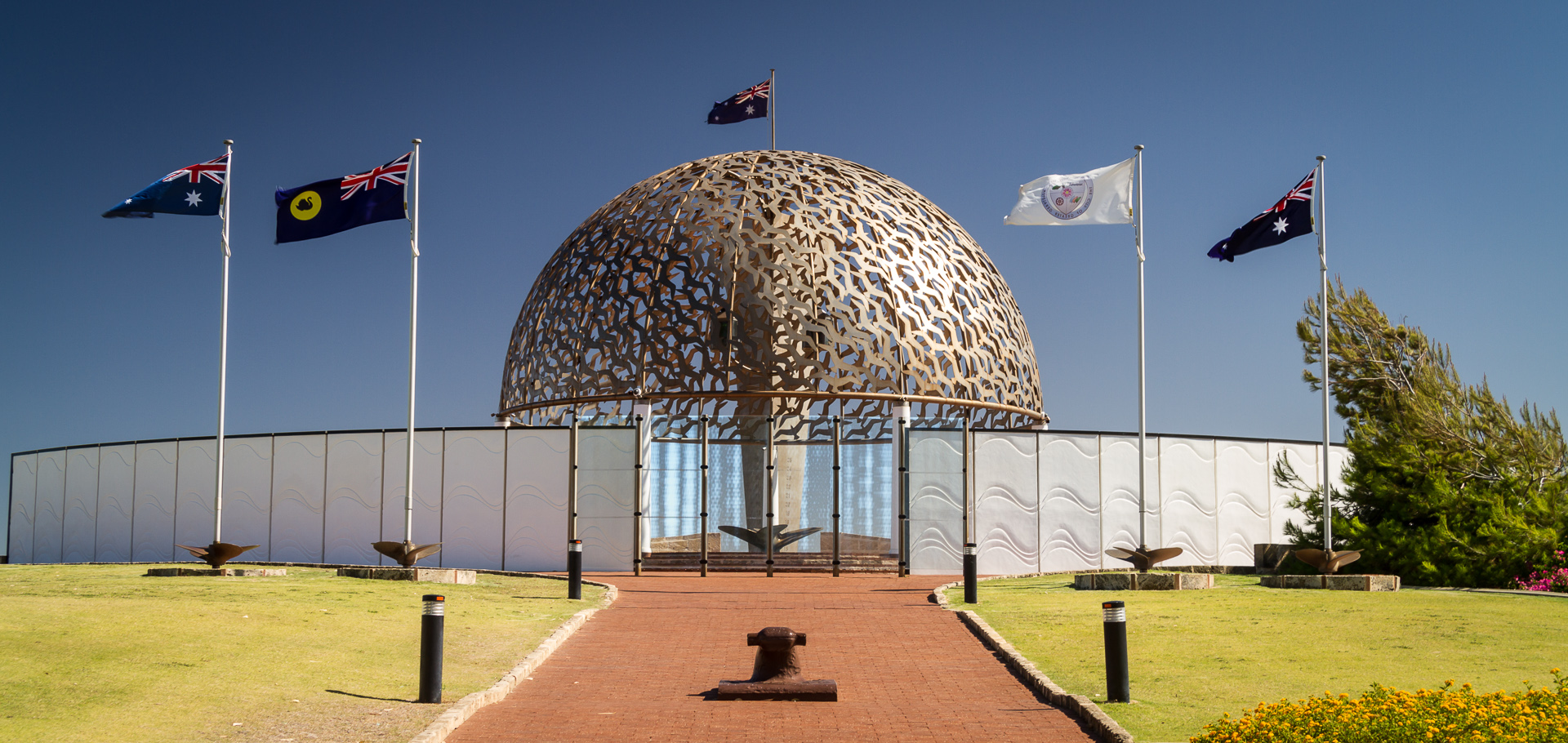
The HMAS Sydney II Memorial in Geraldton

The naval operations in Australian waters during World War II were not publicised during the war, and have received relatively little attention from historians. This forms part of broader limitations in the literature on the defence of the Australian mainland during the war, which includes a lack of any published works providing a comprehensive single-volume history of the topic. The Australian official history series cover the campaigns from the viewpoint of each service separately, with the naval volumes providing an account of each of the sinkings in Australian waters throughout the war. The official history does not cover the experiences of the Merchant Navy, however. A large number of specialist Australian works discuss various aspects of the operations, and the history of the Seamen's Union of Australia covers the experiences of civilian mariners. Coverage of the Japanese submarine campaign against Australia in Japanese-language works is also limited.

There was little official recognition of the role played by the Merchant Navy in the years after the war. Merchant seaman were eventually issued with Merchant Navy War Service medals and were permitted to join Anzac Day marches from the mid-1970s. The surviving members of the Merchant Navy received the same access to military pensions as former service personnel in 1994. As of 2012, three major memorials had been erected to Australian merchant seamen who were killed in Australian waters during World War II. In 1950 BHP established a memorial to the seamen killed on board the ships it operated. This has since been moved to the banks of the Hunter River in central Newcastle. The national Merchant Seaman Memorial at the Australian War Memorial in Canberra was dedicated in 1990. Another memorial is located at the Australian National Maritime Museum in Sydney. A number of small memorials to seamen killed in the war are located across Australia. Since 2008, Merchant Navy Day has been commemorated annually on 3 September and Battle for Australia Day has been observed on the first Wednesday of each September.

There are also several memorials to the military personnel killed in Australian waters. A memorial to HMAS Sydney was dedicated at Geraldton in November 2001. Kormoran's crew erected a memorial to their ship while being held as prisoners of war at Tatura. The loss of HMAS Kuttabul is commemorated by a memorial at the RAN's main base in Sydney (also named HMAS Kuttabul in honour of the sunken ferry), and the RAN has hosted memorial services for the Japanese sailors killed in the raid on Sydney Harbour. A memorial for I-124 is located in Darwin. The people killed in the campaign are buried or commemorated at Commonwealth War Graves Commission cemeteries and a large number of civil cemeteries in Australia. A memorial at Rookwood Cemetery in Sydney commemorates Australian service and Merchant Navy personnel killed Australian waters below the 20th parallel south who have no known grave.

== See also ==
- Axis naval activity in New Zealand waters
