= German auxiliary raider Adjutant =

World War II commerce raider

Coordinates: 41°36′S 173°07′W

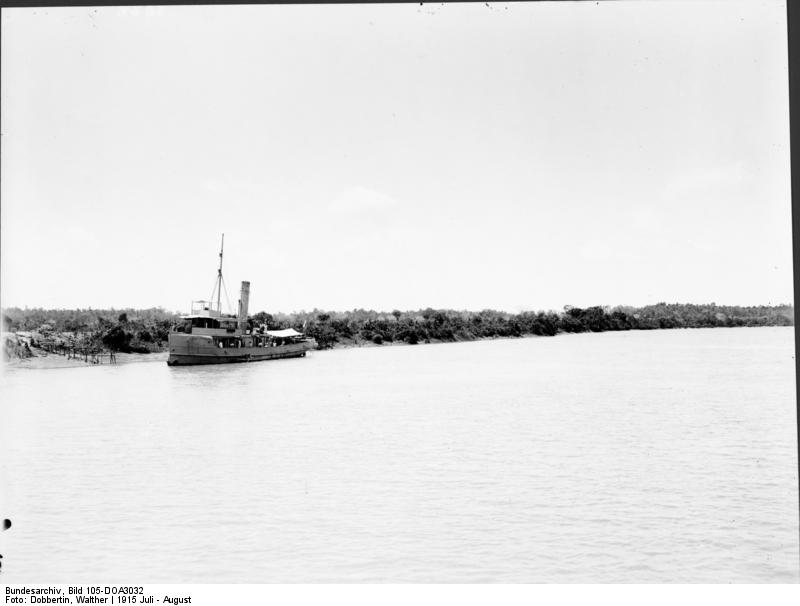
- Adjutant

History
- Name: Pol IX
- Owner: Hvalfangerselskapet "Polaris" A/S
- Port of registry: Larvik
- Builder: Smiths Dock Company, Middlesbrough
- Yard number: 1050
- Launched: 1937
- Fate: Taken as prize on 14 January 1941

Germany
- Name: Adjutant
- Acquired: 14 January 1941
- Commissioned: 10 February 1941
- Reclassified: 24 May 1941
- Fate: Scuttled in Cook Strait, 1 July 1941

General characteristics
- Tonnage: 354 GRT
- Length: 42.80 m (140 ft 5 in)
- Beam: 8.02 m (26 ft 4 in)
- Draught: 3.47 m (11 ft 5 in)
- Propulsion: 1,600 ihp (1,200 kW) steam engine
- Speed: 15 knots (28 km/h; 17 mph)
- Range: 5,000 nautical miles (9,300 km; 5,800 mi) at 14 knots (26 km/h; 16 mph)
- Complement: 2 officers, 14 enlisted
- Armament: 1 × 6 cm (2.4 in) boat gun; 2 × 2 cm (0.79 in) anti-aircraft guns; 20 mines

Adjutant was a Kriegsmarine (German Navy) commerce raider that served during World War II. The vessel was initially the Norwegian whaler Pol IX until captured in 1941 by the German auxiliary cruiser Pinguin. Renamed Adjutant, the vessel was used as a minelayer in the South Atlantic and Indian oceans. After suffering engine trouble, the ship was scuttled on 1 July 1941.

== Construction and career ==
Built as the Norwegian whaler Pol IX, she was captured on 14 January 1941 by the German auxiliary cruiser Pinguin. She was renamed Adjutant and used as a commerce raider. Captained by Adjutant Hemmer and used a first as a scout, she then was used as a minelayer in the South Atlantic Ocean and Indian Ocean.

On the night of 24–25 June 1941 the ship lay ten mines in the approaches to Lyttleton Harbour, New Zealand. She was not detected at all, and this action was not discovered until four years later when they were revealed by captured German documents.

She was scuttled in the Pacific Ocean on 1 July 1941 by the German auxiliary cruiser Komet after suffering engine trouble off the Chatham Islands.
