= MV Nimbin =

1927 steamer ship

Coordinates: 33°15.392′S 151°46.976′E

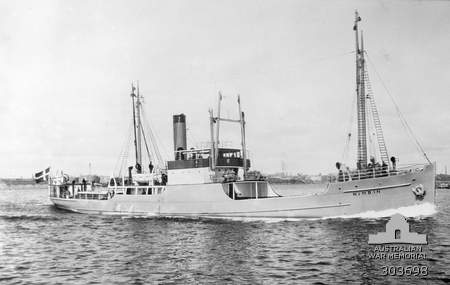

History

Australia
- Name: Nimbin
- Owner: North Coast Steam Navigation Company
- Port of registry: Sydney, Australia
- Route: North Coast Butter Run
- Builder: Burmeister & Wain, Copenhagen, Denmark
- Launched: 27 April 1927
- Maiden voyage: 21 June 1927, from Copenhagen to Sydney in 65 days
- In service: 14 September 1927
- Identification: Official Number: 155313
- Fate: Sunk by German naval mine 5 December 1940

General characteristics
- Type: Steamship
- Tonnage: 1,052 GRT, 516 NRT
- Length: 65.53 m (215 ft 0 in)
- Beam: 10.66 m (35 ft 0 in)
- Draught: 3.352 m (11 ft 0 in)
- Installed power: Burmeister & Wain diesel engine 1,000 horsepower (750 kW)
- Propulsion: Single screw
- Speed: 12.1 knots (22.4 km/h; 13.9 mph)
- Capacity: 60,900 ft^{3} (1,720 m^{3}), and fitted for refrigerated cargo
- Crew: 20

Nimbin was a steel screw steamer built in 1927 at Copenhagen, that was the first motor vessel placed into the New South Wales coastal trade. It was owned and operated by the North Coast Steam Navigation Company and was the first Australian registered merchant ship to be lost during World War II when it struck a mine laid by the German auxiliary cruiser Pinguin. Nimbin was on its way from Coffs Harbour to its home port, Sydney, with a cargo of bundled three-ply timber and a cargo of pigs. One third of the ship was blown away and it sank in three minutes. Seven men were killed. The remaining thirteen clung to bundles of plywood. Some hours later an air force plane from RAAF Base Rathmines saw the survivors and directed the coastal ship SS Bonalbo to the scene to retrieve them.

== Ship description and construction ==
Nimbin was the first motor ship to be employed on the New South Wales coast, and run between Sydney and the northern rivers.

The vessel was built on the slips at the yards of the builders, Burmeister and Wain in Copenhagen, and completed in late June 1927. Upon arrival in Sydney the vessel was described as:

The Nimbin is a vessel of 1,052 GRT with a length of 215 ft 0 in (65.53 m), a width of 35 ft 0 in (10.67 m), and a depth of 13 ft 0 in (3.96 m). She has a total cargo space of 60,900 cubic feet, and is fitted for the carrying of refrigerated cargo. She is a single-screw vessel, propelled by a Burmeister and Wain 6-cylinder 4-cycle Diesel marine engine, with two auxiliary engines for maintaining the electric light and refrigerating services, and for working the winches and other gear. At her speed trials she developed 12.1 knots. A feature of the vessel is the accommodation for the crew, who have, for Instance, a bathroom fitted with hot and cold showers, in fresh and salt water. The three lifeboats are fitted with patent disengaging gear, which it is claimed, can be set afloat by unskilled hands in the space of half a minute.

== Ship service history ==
=== Delivery and maiden voyage ===
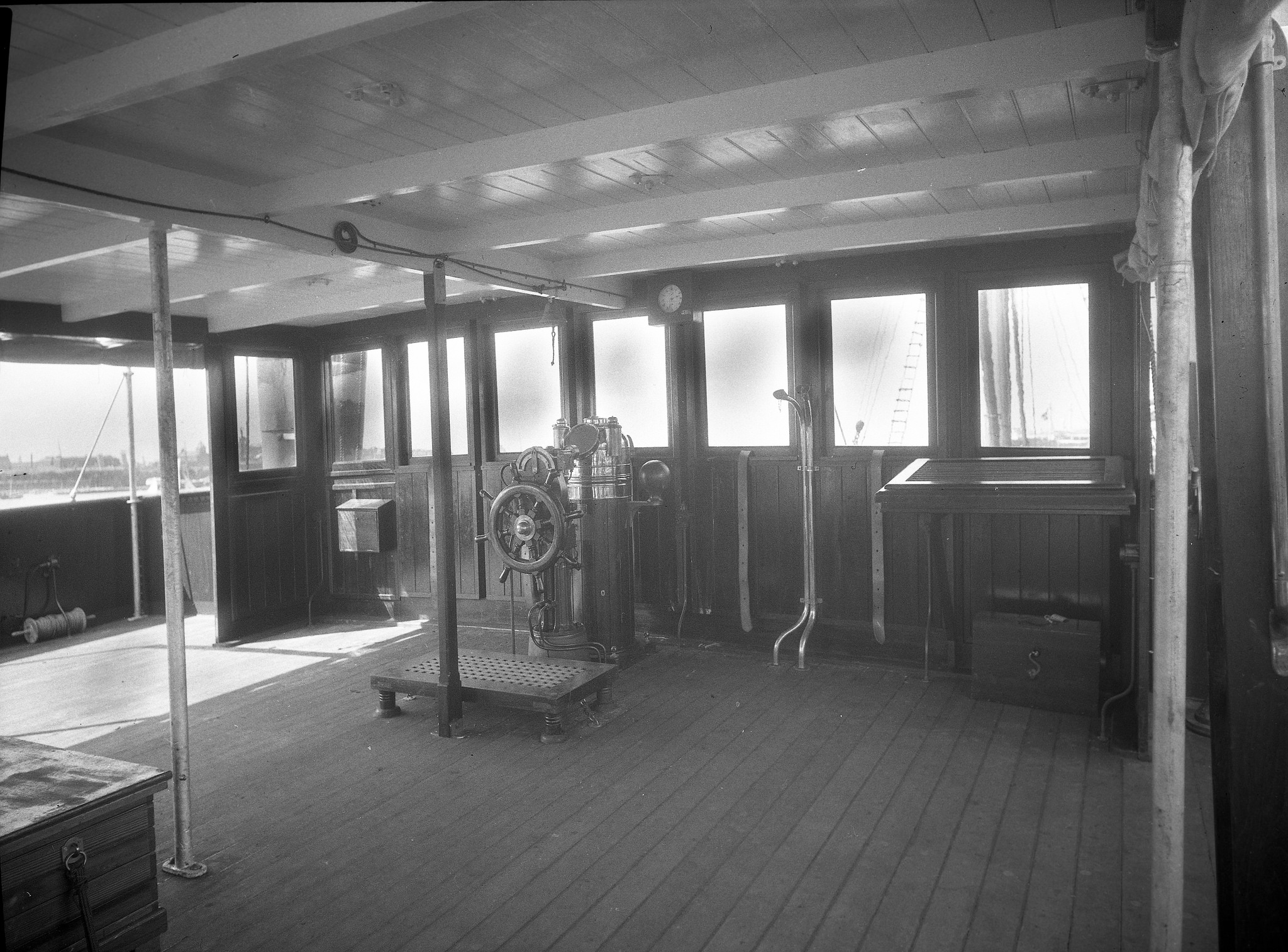
Nimbin's bridge when constructed

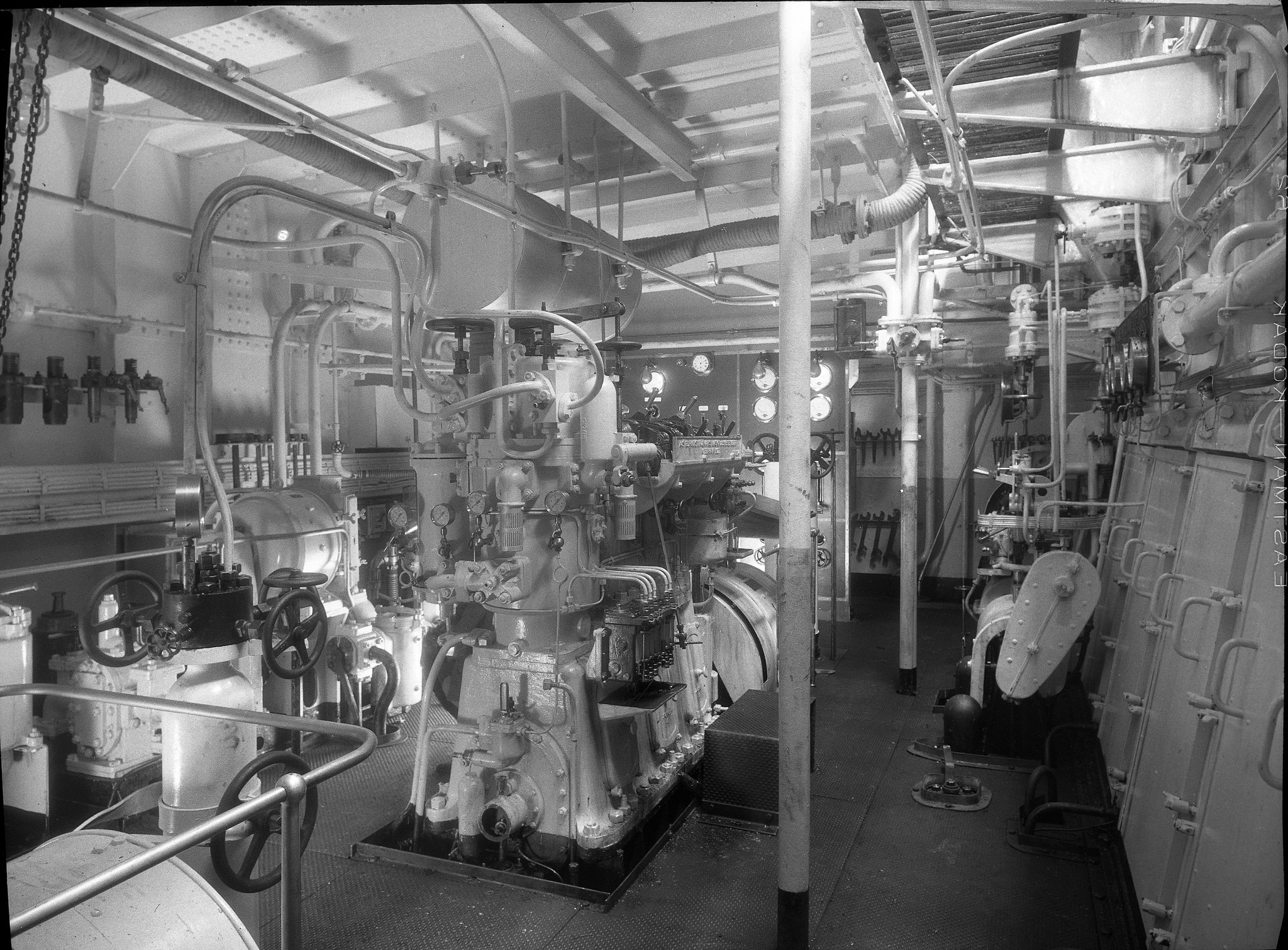
Nimbin's engine room when constructed

Nimbin left Copenhagen, her launching port, under the command of Captain R. M. Beedie on 21 June with a cargo of 305,000 superficial feet of Baltic pine from Hargshamn, Sweden, and completed the journey to Sydney in 65 days, arriving on 27 August. During the delivery voyage the vessel ran into a gale in the Red Sea (the so-called "calm belt") which continued unabated for four days. Upon passing out of the Red Sea, the vessel then encountered the full force of the monsoonal winds, which persisted until it reached Colombo. Then from Colombo to Cape Leeuwin the ship was, in the words of her officers, "under water the whole way," and lost a quantity of her deck cargo of timber. Through it all Nimbin did not once develop engine trouble.

After arrival, the vessel was taken to Mort's Dock for inspection and was docked for overhaul before being placed in commission and into the so-called North Coast Butter Run to the Clarence and Richmond River. A similar but of lighter draught vessel was then ordered for use in the Macleay River trade.

The North Coast Steam Navigation Company's then new motor ship left Sydney on the afternoon of 13 September 1927 on her maiden voyage in the coastal trade. She was the first motor ship to be employed on the New South Wales coast, and ran between Sydney and the Clarence River.

=== Early incidents ===
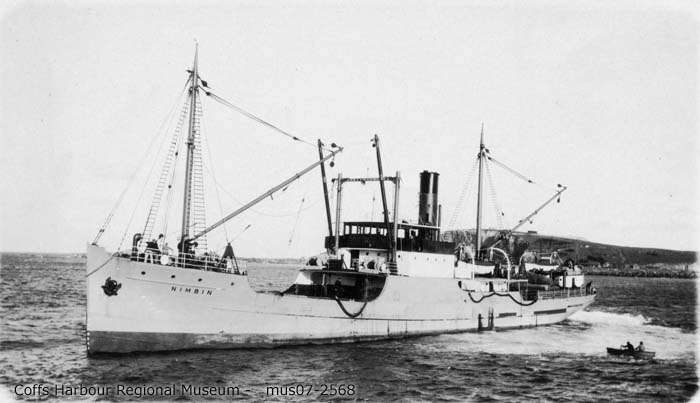
Nimbin as it appeared in 1931 at Coffs Harbour

Seven weeks after going into service the second officer on the ship was fatally injured on 2 November when he fell down the hold of the vessel while the ship was between Lismore and Ballina. The crew, under the direction of the officer, were erecting a chute for the loading of sugar when, by some unknown means, the officer fell the 15 feet (4.6 m) into the hold. He was put ashore and taken to Coraki Hospital, where he died the following morning.

Nearly a year later in mid-October 1928, while coming in across the Richmond bar, Nimbin touched the northern wall lightly, causing the steering gear to be carried away. Some slight damage was done to one of the plates at the water line. Temporary repairs were affected at Ballina. The steamer proceeded up the river. No tugboat was available to help the disabled vessel and had the incident happened further out, the steamer might have become a wreck.

=== Ballina grounding ===
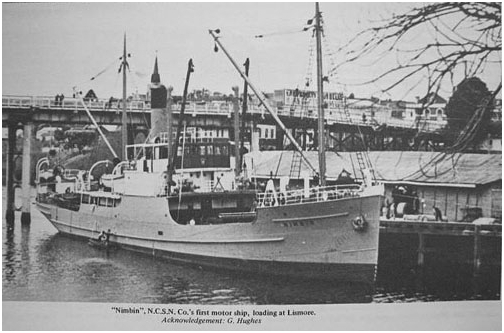
Nimbin at Lismore

At 6am on 22 February 1932, in a heavy fog, Nimbin went ashore about three miles (4.8 km) south of Ballina Heads. The sea was calm at the time, with the fog driving from the north. The ports pilot at Ballina, Captain Lyttle, on learning of the plight of the Nimbin, immediately left port in a motor launch and called upon the dredge Tethys which was ordered to the scene at about 7:30 am, and stood by the stranded vessel. A heavy cable was passed on board and an attempt was made to tow her off, but a fall in the tide had left Nimbin more firmly wedged on the sand. The attempt was abandoned for the time, and it was decided to await the high tide and the arrival of stronger salvage gear. The dredge returned to port to take on more coal and to take out the cables and anchors available at Ballina for salvage purposes. She returned to the Nimbin in the afternoon, but her efforts met with no success.

The North Coast S.N. Company ordered their steamer Ulmarra, which was close by, to proceed to Nimbin. It was hoped that she would be able to effect a salvage on the following morning's flood tide, as it should be powerful enough to tow Nimbin off the sand if Nimbin's position did not become worse during the night. Additionally the company ordered its steamer Arakoon to leave Sydney with a representative of the Sydney Marine Underwriters' and Salvage Association, with the latest salvage gears being taken to Ballina by Arakoon.

After being aground on the beach for 24 hours Nimbin was successfully refloated under her own power about 9:15am 23 February. The cargo was intact but a quantity of oil was pumped from the tanks. The company's vessel Ulmarra, which had been ordered to the scene, was standing by, and had a tow line aboard, but her assistance was not required. The dredge Tethys from Ballina also stood by. Sea anchors had been placed some distance to seaward, and were secured with lines to Nimbin. When the tide was at flood, Nimbin's motors were started, and the vessel hauled on the anchors, and soon slid off the sand. Nimbin proceeded on the Richmond River, safely negotiating the bar. She then commenced to discharge her Sydney cargo. Ulmarra proceeded to the Clarence River. The captain of Nimbin stated that the vessel was travelling at half speed in a heavy haze, which was hanging low over the sea, when the stranding occurred. He said that no damage had been done to the vessel.

=== Later incidents ===
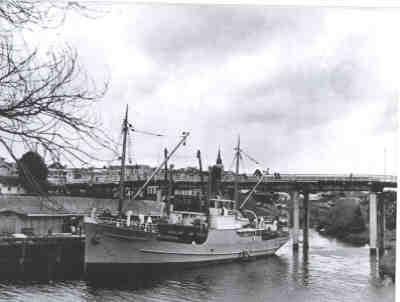
Nimbin at dock on the river

In late December 1934 Ulmarra was partly disabled by the loss of a propeller blade which was snapped off by a submerged object in the Clarence River. Nimbin came to assistance and towed Ulmarra the voyage of nearly 300 miles. The master of the Ulmarra said that Ulmarra was not rendered helpless by the incident, and the ship could, if necessary, have steamed unaided, but as Nimbin was coming down to Sydney from Richmond River, it was considered advisable for Nimbin to assist. During the long tow Ulmarra was able to run her engines, and at times a speed of well over 11 knots (20 km/h; 13 mph) was attained.

On 9 September 1937, Nimbin and the small tug Teven collided on the Richmond River near Coraki. One crewman of Teven was killed, and another was seriously injured. Teven was towing a timber barge when the collision occurred. While coming down the coast in July 1938 Nimbin came across the coastal motor vessel Comara, which had a mechanical breakdown where a bolt had broken and some cogs were partially stripped in the engine room. Nimbin took the Comara in tow at Seal Rocks and brought the vessel into Newcastle during the night.

== Shipwreck event ==
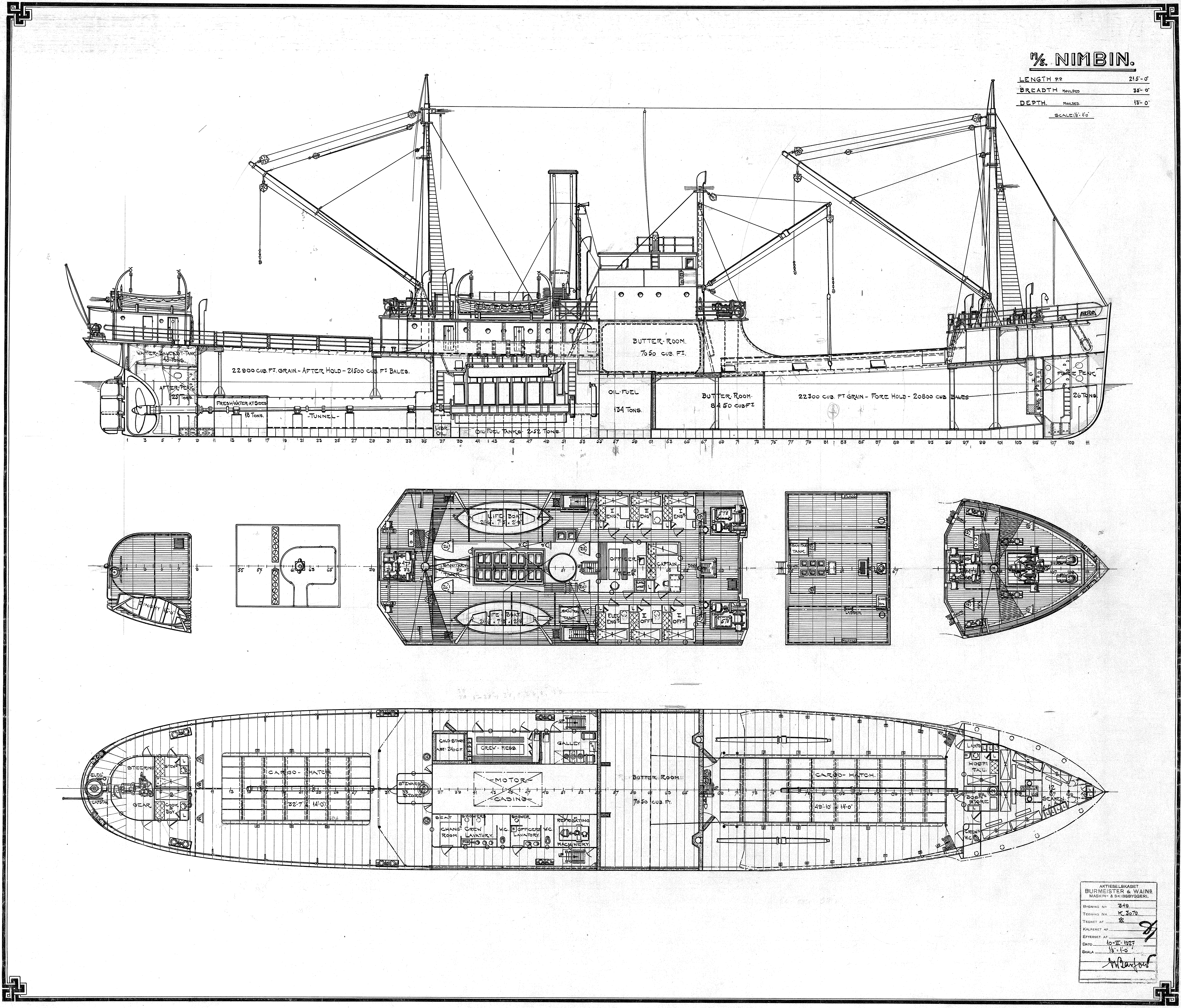
Construction plans of Nimbin

Early in World War II, the Pinguin had laid a number of minefields between Newcastle and Sydney as well as off the eastern and southern coasts of Australia. Their first victims were the British cargo ship Cambridge off Wilsons Promontory, on 7 November 1940, and the day after, the American merchant ship City of Rayville, which sank off Cape Otway. This was the first American casualty of the war, in which the United States was not yet involved.

A month later, on 5 December 1940, Nimbin was the first Australian registered merchant ship to be lost when it ran into a mine off Norah Head on the Central Coast. It was on its way from Coffs Harbour back to Sydney, with a cargo of three-ply timber packed in bundles and a load of pigs.

Without warning, there was a large deafening explosion at 3.25 p.m. just aft of the engine room; the whole after section or about a third of the vessel disappeared and the vessel settled by the stern. The explosion resulted in timber and debris being shot into the air as well as oil from the fuel tanks spurting up like a geyser. Luckily, the oil did not catch fire. Seconds later the survivors found themselves in the calm sea, struggling around, grasping bundles of plywood six feet (1.8 m) long and 3-foot (0.91 m) wide which were scattered over a fairly wide expanse. The bundles of plywood acted as rafts as there had been no chance of even getting near the lifeboats, let alone launching any of them. There had been no chance of sending out a wireless distress call.

At 3.15 p.m. an amphibian aircraft, piloted by a senior officer of the Royal Australian Air Force based on the Rathmines, took off on a reconnaissance flight to seaward. Soon after taking off the pilot saw smoke several miles out to sea. He altered course and made for the spot immediately. He found a great deal of wreckage floating on the surface with the amphibian sighting the wreck site within ten minutes of the explosion. The pilot landed the plane but found the water much rougher than he had expected. Because of the seas and the extent of the wreckage, he was unable to taxi close to one large piece of the flotsam, to which he could see a group of men clinging desperately. He taxied the machine some distance to the lea of a small island, where sheltered water enabled him to take off.

The pilot intended to return directly o his base to obtain help. Soon afterwards, however, he sighted another ship in the vicinity. Flying low, he signalled to it with an Aldous lamp, informing it of the position of the wreckage and directing it to steam immediately to the scene.

SS Bonalbo arrived about two and a half hours after the explosion to pick up the survivors at approximately 6 pm. An ambulance met them and rushed the injured to hospital. The rest, in clothes borrowed from their rescuers on Bonalbo, were sent home by car. At the time most of Nimbin's crew were old employees of the North Coast Steam Navigation Company. The master and second officer both died.
