= Attack on the Dureenbee =

Attack of fishing trawler in 1942 by a Japanese submarine

- Part of the Axis naval activity in Australian waters during World War II
- Date: 3 August 1942
- Attack type: Submarine attack
- Deaths: 3
- Injuries: 8
- Perpetrator: Japanese submarine I-175

On 3 August 1942 the fishing trawler Dureenbee was attacked and badly damaged by Japanese submarine I-175 off the town of Moruya, New South Wales. Three of the trawler's crew were killed, and the ship was subsequently damaged beyond repair after running aground. The incident has been called a war crime.

== Background ==
The Dureenbee was a fishing trawler of 223 tons displacement constructed in 1919. As of 1942, she belonged to Cam and Sons and operated in the seas off the South Coast of New South Wales. She was unarmed. Her crew comprised Captain William Reid and ten other men. Reid had served with the British Royal Navy during World War I.

Two groups of Japanese submarines operated off the east coast of Australia in mid-1942. The first group arrived in May, and launched the attack on Sydney Harbour on the 31st of the month. These submarines subsequently attacked merchant shipping until late June. A second group of three Japanese submarines comprising I-11, I-174 and I-175 commenced operations in mid-July.

I-175 departed the Japanese base at Kwajalein in the central Pacific on 8 July 1942 to operate off Australia. This would be the submarine's fourth war patrol; during the previous three she had mainly operated off Hawaii. The only ship sunk during these patrols was the small United States merchant vessel Mainini on 17 December 1941. The submarine also shelled Palmyra Naval Air Station on Palmyra Atoll on 24 December 1941.

On 23 July I-175 torpedoed the Australian merchant vessel Allara 20 miles (32 km) off Newcastle. While the ship's crew abandoned ship, she did not sink and was towed into Newcastle. The next day the submarine torpedoed and damaged the Australian merchant vessel Murada 82 miles (132 km) north-east of Newcastle. On 26 July she was attacked by HMAS Cairns, and withdrew to the south. Two days later I-175 sank the French merchant vessel Cagou 160 miles (260 km) north-east of Newcastle, before proceeding south.

== Attack ==
At about 1:30 am on 3 August Dureenbee accidentally approached I-175 during one of her fishing voyages. At this time the submarine was on the surface recharging its batteries. The trawler's crew were stowing recently-caught fish and dropping her net, and did not spot I-175.

I-175 initiated the engagement by opening fire on Dureenbee with her deck gun. The first shell missed, and exploded in the sea. After realising the trawler was under attack, Dureenbee's radio operator sent a distress signal. The submarine's crew then opened fire with machine guns, which destroyed the trawler's radio room and badly wounded the radio operator. Two more shells were fired at Dureenbee, with both striking the vessel. The shells destroyed the trawler's wheel house and crippled her engine, leaving the vessel motionless.

Following the initial barrage Reid attempted to contact the Japanese sailors by yelling "don't fire! We are only a harmless fishing boat". This had no effect, and I-175 circled the trawler for 45 minutes. During this time her deck gun continued to fire on Dureenbee. The submarine then submerged, and reappeared six minutes later travelling out to sea.

After I-175 disappeared, Reid fired several distress flares to summon assistance. At this time one member of the trawler's crew was dead, and another two seriously wounded. All of the other sailors had survived the attack with only minor injuries by sheltering behind machinery.

Shortly after the attack on Dureenbee commenced, members of the Moruya Volunteer Defence Corps unit asked the co-owners of the trawler Mirrabooka and one of their crew to put to sea as a rescue vessel. They agreed, and departed the town at 2:30 am. At 6:20 am Dureenbee was spotted by a patrolling Royal Australian Air Force aircraft, which directed Mirrabooka towards her. Once Mirrabooka arrived alongside Dureenbee the damaged trawler's surviving crew and the body of the dead sailor were transferred across. One of the badly wounded sailors died on board Mirrabooka, and the third died in hospital several days later.

== Aftermath ==
An attempt was made to locate and salvage Dureenbee on the morning of 4 August. Mirrabooka was also used for this task, having been commandeered by two members of the Commonwealth Salvage Board. Following a search, Dureenbee was found aground on rocks off the North Head of Batemans Bay. An attempt to tow Dureenbee off the rocks was unsuccessful, with Mirrabooka also nearly running aground and having to be rescued by the trawler Erina. No further attempts to recover Dureenbee were made, though local fishermen removed equipment from the wreck before it sank.

Following the attack I-175 proceeded north, and took up a station to the south of Jervis Bay. On 7 August she was ordered to abandon her patrol off Australia to operate off San Cristobal in the Solomon Islands in response the United States landing on Guadalcanal that day. Five days later two US Navy aircraft attacked and damaged the submarine 170 miles (270 km) south-west of Espiritu Santo, forcing her to break off her patrol for repairs. She arrived at Rabaul on 17 August.

The three members of Dureenbee's crew who were killed in the attack were buried at Moruya Cemetery, with their graves being marked by Merchant Navy headstones. Six RAAF airmen killed during World War II are also buried in the cemetery. The remnants of the trawler still lie in the sea off what is now the Murramarang National Park. As of 2017, it was not a protected site.

An account published during World War II labelled the attack on Dureenbee as "murder and piracy on the high seas". A postwar author has labelled it "barbarism". However, Allied submarines conducted many similar attacks on Japanese fishing boats in the belief that they formed part of the Japanese war economy. In 2017 a local amateur historian noted that Dureenbee's catch would have been used to feed Australian soldiers.
