= German submarine U-862 =

German World War II submarine

History

Nazi Germany
- Name: U-862
- Ordered: 5 June 1941
- Builder: DeSchiMAG AG Weser, Bremen
- Yard number: 1068
- Laid down: 15 August 1942
- Launched: 8 June 1943
- Commissioned: 7 October 1943
- Fate: Taken over by Japan on 5 May 1945

Japan
- Name: I-502
- Acquired: 5 May 1945
- Commissioned: 15 July 1945
- Fate: Surrendered in August 1945; Scuttled on 15 February 1946

General characteristics
- Class & type: Type IXD2 submarine
- Displacement: 1,610 t (1,580 long tons) surfaced; 1,799 t (1,771 long tons) submerged
- Length: 87.58 m (287 ft 4 in) o/a; 68.50 m (224 ft 9 in) pressure hull
- Beam: 7.50 m (24 ft 7 in) o/a; 4.40 m (14 ft 5 in) pressure hull
- Height: 10.20 m (33 ft 6 in)
- Draught: 5.40 m (17 ft 9 in)
- Installed power: 9,000 PS (6,620 kW; 8,880 bhp) (diesels); 1,000 PS (740 kW; 990 shp) (electric)
- Propulsion: 2 shafts; 2 × diesel engines; 2 × electric motors
- Speed: 20.8 knots (38.5 km/h; 23.9 mph) surfaced; 6.9 knots (12.8 km/h; 7.9 mph) submerged
- Range: 12,750 nmi (23,610 km; 14,670 mi) at 10 knots (19 km/h; 12 mph) surfaced; 57 nmi (106 km; 66 mi) at 4 knots (7.4 km/h; 4.6 mph) submerged
- Test depth: 230 m (750 ft)
- Complement: 55 to 64
- Armament: 6 × torpedo tubes (four bow, two stern); 24 × 53.3 cm (21 in) torpedoes; 1 × 3.7 cm (1.5 in) Flak M42 AA gun; 2 × twin 2 cm (0.79 in) C/30 anti-aircraft guns

Service record (Kriegsmarine)
- Part of: 4th U-boat Flotilla; 7 October 1943 – 30 April 1944; 12th U-boat Flotilla; 1 May – 30 September 1944; 33rd U-boat Flotilla; 1 October 1944 – 5 May 1945
- Identification codes: M 52 685
- Commanders: Kptlt. / K.Kapt. Heinrich Timm; 7 October 1943 – 5 May 1945
- Operations: 2 patrols: 1st patrol: a. 3 June – 9 September 1944; b. 5 – 7 November 1944; 2nd patrol: a. 18 November 1944 – 15 February 1945; b. 18 – 20 February 1945
- Victories: 7 merchant ships sunk (42,374 GRT)

Service record (IJN)
- Part of: 1st Southern Expeditionary Fleet; 15 July – August 1945
- Commanders: Kaigun-shōsa Nobuaki Yamanaka; 15 July – August 1945
- Operations: None
- Victories: None

German submarine U-862 was a Type IXD2 U-boat of Nazi Germany's Kriegsmarine during World War II. After Germany's surrender in May 1945, U-862 put into Singapore and was taken over by the Imperial Japanese Navy under the name I-502.

U-862 was laid down on 15 August 1942 by DeSchiMAG AG Weser of Bremen. She was commissioned on 7 October 1943 with Kapitänleutnant Heinrich Timm in command. Timm commanded U-862 for her entire career in Kriegsmarine and received a promotion to Korvettenkapitän on 1 July 1944. U-862 conducted two patrols, sinking seven ships totalling 42,374 GRT.

== Design ==
German Type IXD2 submarines were considerably larger than the original Type IXs. U-862 had a displacement of 1,610 tonnes (1,580 long tons) when at the surface and 1,799 tonnes (1,771 long tons) while submerged. The U-boat had a total length of 87.58 m (287 ft 4 in), a pressure hull length of 68.50 m (224 ft 9 in), a beam of 7.50 m (24 ft 7 in), a height of 10.20 m (33 ft 6 in), and a draught of 5.35 m (17 ft 7 in). The submarine was powered by two MAN M 9 V 40/46 supercharged four-stroke, nine-cylinder diesel engines plus two MWM RS34.5S six-cylinder four-stroke diesel engines for cruising, producing a total of 9,000 metric horsepower (6,620 kW; 8,880 shp) for use while surfaced, two Siemens-Schuckert 2 GU 345/34 double-acting electric motors producing a total of 1,000 shaft horsepower (1,010 PS; 750 kW) for use while submerged. She had two shafts and two 1.85 m (6 ft) propellers. The boat was capable of operating at depths of up to 200 metres (660 ft).

The submarine had a maximum surface speed of 20.8 knots (38.5 km/h; 23.9 mph) and a maximum submerged speed of 6.9 knots (12.8 km/h; 7.9 mph). When submerged, the boat could operate for 121 nautical miles (224 km; 139 mi) at 2 knots (3.7 km/h; 2.3 mph); when surfaced, she could travel 12,750 nautical miles (23,610 km; 14,670 mi) at 10 knots (19 km/h; 12 mph). U-862 was fitted with six 53.3 cm (21 in) torpedo tubes (four fitted at the bow and two at the stern), 24 torpedoes, and a 3.7 cm (1.5 in) Flak M42 with 2575 rounds as well as two 2 cm (0.79 in) C/30 anti-aircraft guns with 8100 rounds. The boat had a complement of fifty-five.

== Service history ==
=== First patrol ===
U-862 was one of the most travelled of all U-boats. She sailed from Germany in May 1944 and eventually reached Penang, in Japanese-controlled Malaya, in September 1944. Penang was the base for the 33rd U-boat Flotilla, code-named Monsun Gruppe ("Monsoon Group").

On the way there, she launched a T5/G7es Zaunkönig I acoustic homing torpedo at a tanker. The Zaunkönig came around full circle to home in on U-862. Only an emergency crash dive and staying silent saved the U-boat from her own torpedo. She also shot down an Allied Consolidated PBY Catalina aircraft H of No. 265 Squadron RAF on 20 August 1944 and then escaped an intense search for her. She sank several merchant ships in the Mozambique Channel between Africa and Madagascar.

=== Second patrol ===
U-862 departed for her second war patrol from Batavia in the Japanese-occupied Netherlands East Indies in December 1944. She sailed down the west coast of Australia, across the Great Australian Bight, around the southern coast of Tasmania and then north towards Sydney where she sank the U.S.-registered Liberty ship Robert J. Walker on 25 December 1944. She then travelled around New Zealand and entered the port of Napier at night undetected. This has given birth to an urban legend in New Zealand, where it is said that the captain of U-862 sent sailors ashore at night to steal fresh milk from a farm. This may arise from a joke made by Captain Timm to Air Vice Marshal Sir Rochford Hughes in the late 1950s. U-862's voyage to New Zealand was portrayed in a stage comedy U Boat Down Under which was written and directed by Peter Tait and performed at Downstage Theatre, Wellington from 27 July to 5 August 2006.

U-862 then returned to the Indian Ocean. On 6 February 1945, about 1,520 km (820 nm) south-west of Fremantle, U-862 sank the U.S.-registered Liberty ship, Peter Silvester, which was loaded with mules bound for Burma.

U-862 was also a trial boat for the FuMo 65 Hohentwiel radar system. This was cranked out of a casing on the port side of the conning tower and rose on a mast. The aerial was hand trained onto targets whilst the U-boat was on the surface. The radar had a range up to 7 nmi (13 km; 8.1 mi) and was very effective where there was little risk from air attack on the U-boat.

=== Transfer to Japan ===
When Germany surrendered in May 1945, she put into Singapore and was taken over by the Imperial Japanese Navy. On 15 July 1945 she became the IJN submarine I-502. The I-502 surrendered at Singapore in August 1945 and was scuttled in the Strait of Malacca at 03°05′N 100°38′E on 15 February 1946.

The German crew of U-862 suffered no casualties, and some returned to Germany several years after the war. Others who were interned at Kinmel Camp, Bodelwyddan, North Wales, remained in Wales and settled in the neighbouring communities of Rhyl, Rhuddlan and Prestatyn, due to the risks of returning to the Soviet occupied areas of Germany after the war. Two of the crew are buried at the new cemetery at Rhuddlan, North Wales, on nearby plots.

== Summary of raiding history ==
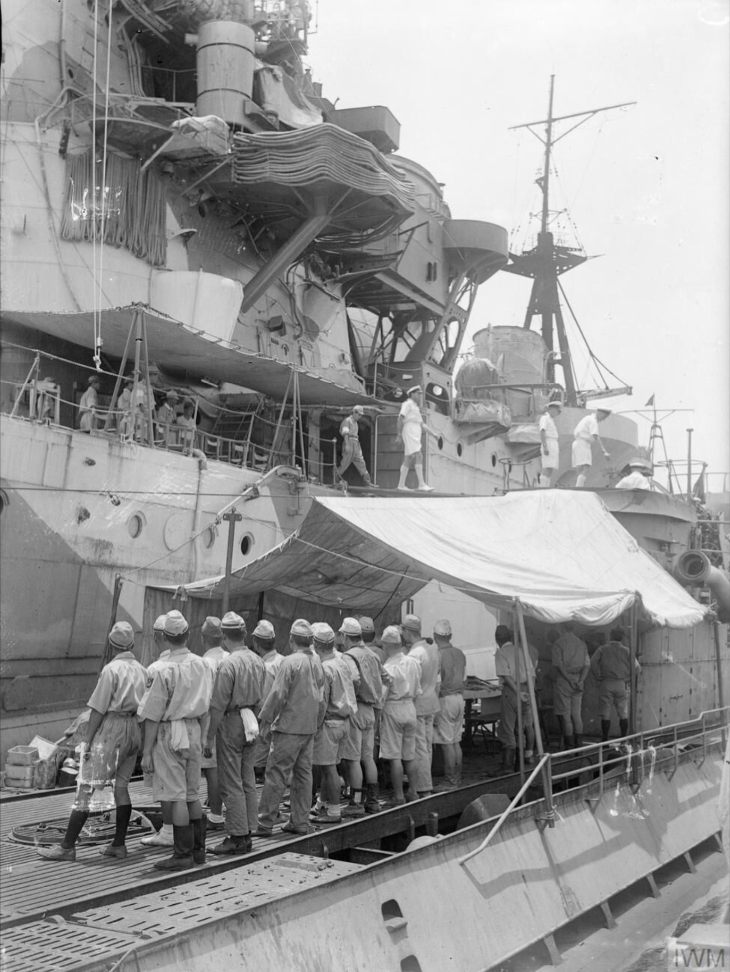
U-boat (either U-181 or U-862) moored next to the Japanese cruiser Myōkō

Date	Ship name	Nationality	Tonnage (GRT)	Fate
25 July 1944	Robin Goodfellow	United States	6,885	Sunk
13 August 1944	Radbury	United Kingdom	3,614	Sunk
16 August 1944	Empire Lancer	United Kingdom	7,037	Sunk
18 August 1944	Nairung	United Kingdom	5,414	Sunk
19 August 1944	Wayfarer	United Kingdom	5,068	Sunk
24 December 1944	Robert J. Walker	United States	7,180	Sunk
6 February 1945	Peter Silvester	United States	7,176	Sunk

== See also ==
- Axis naval activity in Australian waters
- Axis naval activity in New Zealand waters

== Bibliography ==
- Busch, Rainer; Röll, Hans-Joachim (1999). German U-boat commanders of World War II : a biographical dictionary. Translated by Brooks, Geoffrey. London, Annapolis, Md: Greenhill Books, Naval Institute Press. ISBN 1-55750-186-6.
- Busch, Rainer; Röll, Hans-Joachim (1999). Der U-Boot-Krieg, 1939-1945: Deutsche U-Boot-Verluste von September 1939 bis Mai 1945 [German U-boat losses from September 1939 to May 1945] (in German). Vol. IV. Hamburg, Berlin, Bonn: Mittler. ISBN 3-8132-0514-2.
- Gröner, Eric; Jung, Dieter; Maass, Martin (1991). German Warships 1815-1945: U-boats and Mine Warfare Vessels. Vol. 2. Translated by Thomas, Keith; Magowan, Rachel. London: Conway Maritime Press. ISBN 0-85177-593-4.
- Shone, Gerald (2016). U-boat in New Zealand Waters. Auckland: Pahiatua Publications. ISBN 978-0-473-35128-1.
