= USS Corpus Christi (PF-44) =

Tacoma-class patrol frigate

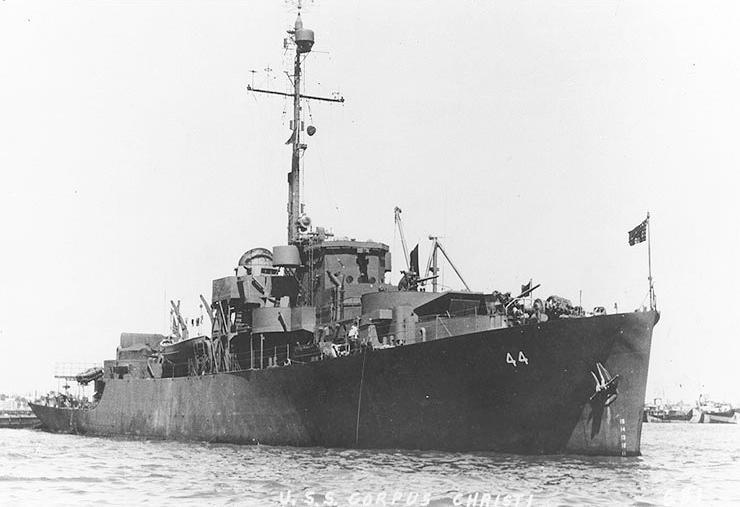
- USS Corpus Christi (PF-44)

History

United States
- Name: Corpus Christi
- Namesake: City of Corpus Christi, Texas
- Builder: Consolidated Steel Corporation, Wilmington, California
- Laid down: 17 July 1943
- Launched: 17 August 1943
- Commissioned: 29 January 1944
- Decommissioned: 2 August 1946
- Fate: Sold, 3 October 1947

General characteristics
- Class & type: Tacoma-class frigate
- Displacement: 1,430 long tons (1,453 t) light; 2,415 long tons (2,454 t) full
- Length: 303 ft 11 in (92.63 m)
- Beam: 37 ft 6 in (11.43 m)
- Draft: 13 ft 8 in (4.17 m)
- Propulsion: 2 × 5,500 shp (4,101 kW) turbines; 3 boilers; 2 shafts
- Speed: 20 knots (37 km/h; 23 mph)
- Complement: 190
- Armament: 3 × 3"/50 dual purpose guns (3x1); 4 x 40 mm guns (2×2); 9 × 20 mm guns (9×1); 1 × Hedgehog anti-submarine mortar; 8 × Y-gun depth charge projectors; 2 × Depth charge tracks

USS Corpus Christi (PF-44), a Tacoma-class frigate, was the first ship of the United States Navy to be named for Corpus Christi, Texas.

== Construction ==
Corpus Christi (PF-44) was launched 17 August 1943, by Consolidated Steel Corp., Wilmington, California; sponsored by Mrs. C. Driscoll; commissioned 29 January 1944, at San Pedro, California and reported to the Pacific Fleet.

== Service history ==
Corpus Christi cleared San Pedro on 31 May 1944, sailing for Nouméa, Cairns, and Perth, Western Australia, arriving 18 July. Here she had duty aiding submarines in exercises and training under Commander, Submarines, 7th Fleet. Corpus Christi was twice commended for unusual accomplishments while under this command, first for locating and rescuing 92 survivors of the torpedoed SS Peter Silvester in the Indian Ocean 13 February 1945 after an extended search by all available ships of the United States and Australian Navies, and second, for refueling the British battleship HMS Howe at sea between 13 and 15 June.

Corpus Christi stood out of Perth 27 August 1945 for Manus, Pearl Harbor, and San Pedro, arriving 3 October. Here she was converted into a weather ship at Terminal Island. Corpus Christi was on loan to the Coast Guard from 15 April to 5 July 1946. She was decommissioned 2 August 1946 and sold 3 October 1947.
