= German auxiliary cruiser Pinguin =

World War II German auxiliary cruiser

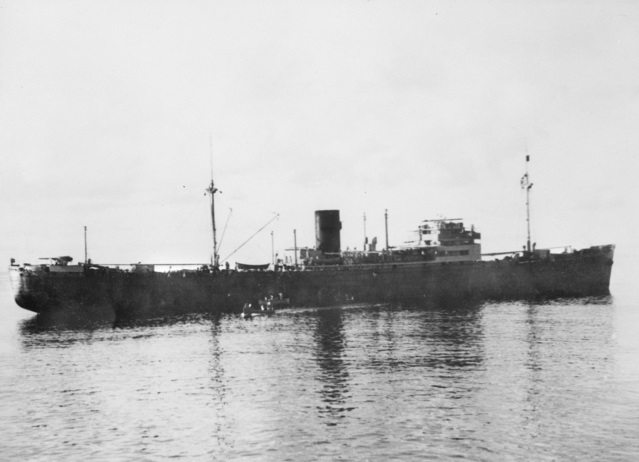
- Pinguin in the Indian Ocean in 1941.

History

Germany
- Name: Kandelfels
- Owner: DDG Hansa
- Builder: Deutsche Schiff-und Maschinebau A.G. Werk A.G. 'Weser' (Deschimag)
- Launched: 12 November 1936
- Completed: 1937
- Renamed: Schiff 33/HSK-5
- Fate: Requisitioned by Kriegsmarine, 1939

Nazi Germany
- Name: Pinguin
- Namesake: Penguin
- Acquired: 1939
- Recommissioned: 6 February 1940
- Reclassified: Auxiliary cruiser, 1940
- Nickname(s): HSK-5; Schiff 33; Raider F
- Fate: Sunk in the Indian Ocean by HMS Cornwall, 8 May 1941

General characteristics
- Type: Freighter as Kadelfels; Merchant raider as Pinguin
- Displacement: 17,600 long tons (17,900 t)
- Length: 155 m (509 ft)
- Beam: 18.7 m (61 ft)
- Draft: 8.7 m (29 ft)
- Installed power: 7,600 hp (5,700 kW)
- Propulsion: 2 × 6-cylinder diesel engines
- Speed: 17 knots (31 km/h; 20 mph)
- Range: 60,000 nmi (110,000 km; 69,000 mi) at 12 kn (22 km/h; 14 mph)
- Endurance: 207 days
- Complement: 401
- Armament: 6 × 15 cm SK L/45 guns; 1 × 75 mm (3.0 in) gun; 1 × twin 3.7 cm SK C/30 anti-aircraft guns; 2 × twin 2 cm SK C/38; 2 × 533 mm Torpedo Tubes; 300 × EMC Mines
- Aircraft carried: 2 × Heinkel He 114 A-2 early; 1 × Arado Ar 196 A-1 later

Pinguin was a German auxiliary cruiser (Hilfskreuzer) which served as a commerce raider in the Second World War. The Pinguin was known to the Kriegsmarine as Schiff 33, and designated HSK 5. The most successful commerce raider of the war, she was known to the British Royal Navy as Raider F. The name Pinguin means penguin in German.

== Background ==
=== German commerce raiding ===
At first the Kriegsmarine had no plans to use commerce raiders, despite their use in the First World War and interwar thought about their use. Armed merchant cruisers of the type used by the British were too big, too hard to disguise and keep supplied with fuel. Ordinary merchant ships were a better prospect, especially those with a long range and were easier to alter to look like neutral and Allied ships to deceive their targets and Allied warships. Planning began soon after the declarations of war and by the end of September a first wave of six ships had been identified.

Each ship would need a crew of 284 men, six 150 mm guns, four 20 mm anti-aircraft guns, four torpedo tubes, provision for 400 mines and two seaplanes. The ships needed to be at sea for a year, cruising for 40,000 nmi (74,000 km; 46,000 mi). The first raider was to sail in November 1939 but it took until 31 March 1940 before the first raider sailed and July before all of the first wave had departed. By March 1941 the seven raiders in action had sunk or taken 80 ships of 494,291 gross register tons (GRT).

=== Kandelfels ===
Formerly a freighter named Kandelfels, she was completed by AG Weser in 1937 and was owned and operated by the Hansa Line, Bremen. The ship was of gross register tonnage (7,766 GRT) was 508 ft 6 in (154.99 m) long, 61 ft 4 in (18.69 m) in the beam with a draught of 27 ft 4 in (8.33 m) and a speed of 16 kn (30 km/h; 18 mph). In the winter of 1939–1940, she was requisitioned by the Kriegsmarine and converted to a warship by DeSchiMAG, Bremen. Her main armament of six 5.9-inch guns was taken from the obsolete battleship Schlesien and covered by steel shutters fitted with counterweights. The secondary armament consisted of a 75 mm gun, a twin 37 mm anti-aircraft gun and two twin 20 mm anti-aircraft guns. In the holds were 300 mines and two Heinkel He 114 floatplanes.

== Prelude ==
=== North Sea ===
Pinguin (under Fregattenkapitän, later Kapitän zur See Ernst-Felix Krüder) was one of the first wave of raiders sent out by the Kriegsmarine, sailing from Gotenhafen on 15 June 1940 to operate in the Southern Ocean and the Indian Ocean. Arriving off the Danish Lollard on 17 June and met Sperrbrecher IV, a type with a specially-armoured hull designed to set off mines and two torpedo boat escorts. At the Kattegat Sperrbrecher IV departed and with two minesweepers, the ships entered the North Sea with an escort of a Dornier 18 flying boat and two fighter aircraft. Off Bergen in Norway the torpedo boats departed and Pinguin with the minesweepers put in to Sørgulen Fjord. The crew disguised Pinguin as the Soviet Petschura and then sailed for the North Cape in a severe storm. A British submarine surfaced and demanded that the ship identify itself but Krüder ignored them and sailed on; the submarine fired three torpedoes but they missed and Pinguin escaped.

=== Atlantic Ocean ===
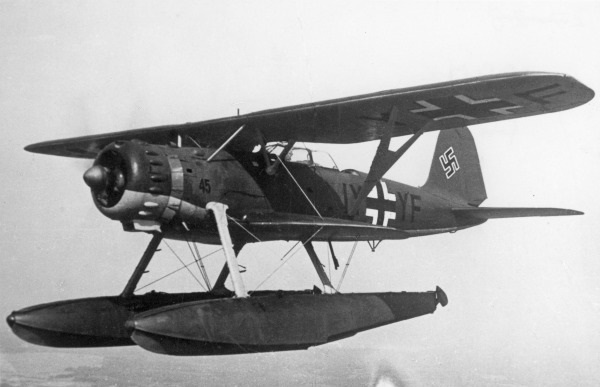
Photograph of a He 114 floatplane

Krüder headed for Jan Mayen, intending to wait for poor weather in the Denmark Strait before attempting to break out into the Atlantic for a rendezvous with U-A near the Cape Verde islands. The plan was assisted by the British diversion of ships from the Northern Patrol to take part in the evacuation of the British Expeditionary Force from Dunkirk evacuation which left the Denmark Strait unguarded. The ship reached Jan Mayen on 24 June but the expected fog had not formed. When the ship reached Greenland the fog returned and then the ship waited for three days for bad weather.

The ship entered the Atlantic on 1 July. After sailing past the Azores, the ship changed disguise to the Greek Kassos. On 17 July the rendezvous with U-A took place off the Saint Peter and Saint Paul Archipelago and eleven torpedoes were transferred to the U-boat. To conserve fuel U-A was taken in tow, towards Africa until close to Freetown but machinery trouble forced U-A to return to Germany, sinking four merchant ships en route with the torpedoes from Pinguin.

== Operations ==
=== South Atlantic ===
On 31 July, near Ascension Island about 1,200 nmi (2,200 km; 1,400 mi) off west Africa, a ship was sighted at about 9:00 a.m. in clear weather. The ship was the British 5,538 GRT SS Domingo de Larrinaga which turned away, transmitted an unknown attacker alert in Morse, "QQQQ" [– – • –] × 4, prepared the stern gun for action and raised the flag. Krüder give chase, trying to jam the wireless calls from the ship and gradually overhauled it, opening fire at a range of 2 nmi (3.7 km; 2.3 mi). Several hits on Domingo de Larrinaga started a fire near the bridge and killed four men; 32 members of the crew took to three lifeboats. The ship was boarded and then sunk by torpedo after a scuttling charge failed to explode.

=== Indian Ocean ===
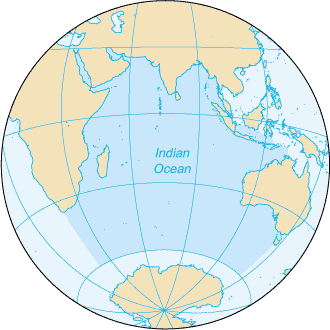
The Indian Ocean

Pinguin continued south and on 19 August passed the Cape of Good Hope into the Indian Ocean. On 26 August, off the coast of Madagascar, Krüder sent one of the Heinkel He 114B seaplanes, carrying British markings, to reconnoitre for ships. At 12:50 p.m. the Norwegian tanker MV Filefjell (6,901 GRT) carrying 10,000 long tons (10,000 t) of petrol and 500 long tons (510 t) of oil for Cape Town was seen. The pilot dropped a message purportedly from a British officer, that a German raider was in the area and ordered the ship to alter course and keep radio silence. The tanker followed the instructions, unknowingly heading for Pinguin 140 nmi (260 km; 160 mi) away.

== Action of 8 May 1941 ==
Pinguin was sunk on 8 May 1941 by the British heavy cruiser HMS Cornwall. She was the first auxiliary cruiser of the Kriegsmarine to suffer this fate. Pinguin exploded when the mines stored on board were hit and detonated; 332 members of the crew and about 200 of the prisoners were killed. Cornwall rescued 60 crew members and 22 prisoners who had been taken from the 28 merchant ships the raider had sunk or captured.

=== Freighters attacked by Pinguin ===
Merchant ships sunk or taken as prizes by Pinguin
Name	Flag	GRT	Type	Notes
Domingo de Larrinaga	United Kingdom	5,358	Freighter	31 July 1940, 05°26'S, 18°06'W, torpedoed, 8† 30 (POW)
MV Filefjell	Norway	6,901	Tanker	27 August 1940, sunk 34°S, 51°E, 32 (POW)
British Commander	United Kingdom	5,008	Tanker	27 August 1940, torpedoed 29°37'S, 45°50'E, 46 (POW)
Morviken	Norway	7,616	Freighter	27 August 1940, 29°S, 51°E, scuttled
Benavon	United Kingdom	5,872	Freighter	12 September 1940, gunfire, 21†
Nordvard	Norway	4,111	Freighter	16 September 1940, 30°S, 60°E, 200 (POW) to Bordeaux
Storstad	Norway	8,998	Tanker	7 October 1940, prize. (Note: Converted to minelayer Passat, Bass Strait, Bordeaux, 30 crew returned to Norway 1 (POW))
Nowshera	United Kingdom	7,920	Freighter	19 November 1940, 30°S, 90°E, scuttled, 113 (POW)
Maimoa	United Kingdom	10,123	Freighter	20 November 1940, 31°50'S, 100°21'E, scuttled, 87 (POW)
Port Brisbane	United Kingdom	8,739	Freighter	21 November 1940, 29°22'S, 96°36'E, torpedoed, 1†
Port Wellington	United Kingdom	8,303	Freighter	30 November 1940, 32°10'S, 75°E, gunfire, 82 (POW)
Empire Light	United Kingdom	6,828	Freighter	25 April 1941, scuttled
Clan Buchanan	United Kingdom	7,266	Freighter	28 April 1941, 05°24'N, 62°46'E, scuttled, 121 (POW)
British Emperor	United Kingdom	3,663	Tanker	7 May 1941, 08°30'N, 56°25'E, torpedoed, 45 (POW) 8 surv

=== Norwegian whaling fleet ===
The Norwegian whaling fleet captured by Pinguin on 14 January 1941.
!Name	Flag	GRT	Type	Notes
Ole Wegger	Norway	12,201	Factory ship	14 January 1941, dispatched to Bordeaux with prize crew
Pelagos	Norway	12,083	Factory ship	14 January 1941, dispatched to Bordeaux with prize crew
Solglimt	Norway	12,246	Supply ship	14 January 1941, dispatched to Bordeaux with prize crew
Torlyn	Norway	247	Whaler	14 January 1941, dispatched to Bordeaux with prize crew
Pol VIII	Norway	293	Whaler	14 January 1941, dispatched to Bordeaux with prize crew
Pol IX	Norway	354	Whaler	14 January 1941, made an auxiliary, Adjutant
Pol X	Norway	354	Whaler	14 January 1941, dispatched to Bordeaux with prize crew
Star XIV	Norway	247	Whaler	14 January 1941, dispatched to Bordeaux with prize crew
Star XIX	Norway	249	Whaler	14 January 1941, dispatched to Bordeaux with prize crew, sunk by HMS Scarborough
Star XX	Norway	249	Whaler	14 January 1941, dispatched to Bordeaux with prize crew
Star XXI	Norway	298	Whaler	14 January 1941, dispatched to Bordeaux with prize crew
Star XXII	Norway	303	Whaler	14 January 1941, dispatched to Bordeaux with prize crew
Star XXIII	Norway	357	Whaler	14 January 1941, dispatched to Bordeaux with prize crew
Star XXIV	Norway	361	Whaler	14 January 1941, dispatched to Bordeaux with prize crew, sunk by HMS Scarborough

=== Ships mined by Pinguin and Passat ===
Sunk by mines from Pinguin and Passat
Name	Flag	GRT	Type	Notes
SS Cambridge	United Kingdom	10,846	Reefer ship	7 November 1940, sank, 8 November, 1†, 55 surv
MS City of Rayville	United States	5,883	Freighter	9 November 1940, 38°51'S, 143°39'E, 1†, 38 surv (Note: First US ship sunk in the war)
MV Nimbin	Australia	1,052	Freighter	5 December 1940, ~7†
FV Millimumul	Australia	287	Trawler	26 March 1941, 7†

== Bibliography ==
- Allen, Tony (2017). "FV Millimumul". wrecksite eu.
- Brice, Martin (1981). Axis Blockade Runners of World War II. London: B. T. Batsford. ISBN 0-7134-2686-1.
- Duffy, James P. (2005). Hitler's Secret Pirate Fleet: The Deadliest Ships of World War II. Westport, CT: Praeger. ISBN 0-275-96685-2.
- Edwards, Bernard (2001). Beware Raiders!: German Surface Raiders in the Second World War. Barnsley: Leo Cooper (Pen & Sword). ISBN 978-1-78337-907-1.
- Jordan, Roger W. (2006) [1999]. The World's Merchant Fleets 1939: The Particulars and Wartime Fates of 6,000 Ships (2nd ed.). London: Chatham/Lionel Leventhal. ISBN 978-1-86176-293-1.
- Maier, Klaus A.; Rohde, Horst; Stegemann, Bernd; Umbreit, Hans (2015) [1991]. Falla, P. S. (ed.). Germany and the Second World War: Germany's Initial Conquests in Europe. Vol. II. Translated by McMurry, Dean S.; Osers, Ewald (trans. pbk. Clarendon Press, Oxford ed.). Freiburg im Breisgau: Militärgeschichtliches Forschungsamt [Research Institute for Military History]. ISBN 978-0-19-873834-3.
  - Stegemann, Bernd. "Part VIII The Second Phase of the War at Sea (until the Spring of 1941)". In Maier et al. (2015).
- Robinson, Stephen (2016). False Flags: Disguised German Raiders of World War II. Wollombi, New South Wales: Exisle. ISBN 978-1-92-533515-6.
- Rohwer, Jürgen; Hümmelchen, Gerhard (2005) [1972]. Chronology of the War at Sea, 1939–1945: The Naval History of World War Two (3rd rev. ed.). London: Chatham. ISBN 978-1-86176-257-3.
- Vleggeert, Nico (2024). "MV Nimbin". wrecksite eu.
- Gröner, Erich (1985). Die deutschen Kriegsschiffe 1815-1945 Band 3: U-boote, Hilfskreuzer, Minenschiffe, Netzleger, Sperrbrecher (in German). Koblenz: Bernard & Graefe Verlag. ISBN 3-7637-4802-4.
