= SS Peter Silvester =

World War II Liberty ship of the United States

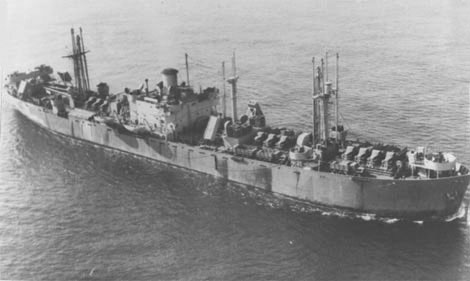
- SS Peter Silvester

History

United States
- Name: Peter Silvester
- Namesake: Peter Silvester
- Builder: California Shipbuilding Corp.
- Laid down: 31 March 1942
- Launched: 27 May 1942
- Home port: Los Angeles, California
- Fate: Sunk, 6 February 1945

General characteristics
- Class & type: Liberty ship
- Length: 441 ft (134 m)
- Beam: 57 ft (17 m)
- Draft: 37 ft (11 m)
- Propulsion: Steam
- Speed: 11 knots (20 km/h; 13 mph)
- Armament: 1 × 4-inch/50-caliber guns (4×1); 1 × 3-inch/50-caliber guns (3×1); 8 × 20 mm guns (9×1)

SS Peter Silvester, was an American merchant marine ship built for the United States Maritime Commission. She was operated by the Pacific Far East Line under charter with the Maritime Commission and War Shipping Administration. Peter Silvester was torpedoed and sunk by the German submarine U-862 off the coast of Australia in the Indian Ocean on February 6, 1945. 33 men aboard the ship died and 142 were eventually rescued, with some rescued weeks after the initial sinking.

== History ==
The SS Peter Silvester was laid down on March 31, 1942 and built by the California Shipbuilding Corp. The ship was named after Peter Silvester (1734–1808), an American politician who was a member of the United States House of Representatives from New York, who backed the patriot cause during the American Revolution. The ship launched nearly two months later, on May 27, 1942.

== Sinking ==
=== 1st attempt ===
On April 29, 1943, the ship, unescorted, was unsuccessfully attacked by Japanese submarine I-19 while en route from Espírito Santo to San Francisco, California. Two torpedoes passed beneath the ship and exploded harmlessly some distance away.

=== 2nd attempt ===
On February 6, 1945 the Peter Silvester was torpedoed by the German submarine U-862 in the Indian Ocean, (34°19′S 99°37′E), about 900 miles (1,400 km) miles west of Cape Leeuwin, Western Australia. Both torpedoes struck on the starboard side at the #3 hold. It was reported that one torpedo went straight through the ship while the other detonated in the hold which ruptured the deck forward of the bridge and blew off the hatch cover. This led to flooding of the hold and the engine room. The ship was then hit at 17.10 hours by two more torpedoes on the starboard side at the traverse bulkhead between holds #2 and #3. The eight officers, 34 crewmen, 26 armed guards and 107 US Army troops abandoned ship in four lifeboats and six rafts. Soon after, the ship was hit by a coup de grâce at the #1 hold. This caused the ship to break in two. The forward section sank immediately, while the after section stayed afloat and was last seen deep in the water in the evening of February 8th. At the time of its sinking, the ship was carrying 2,700 tons of US Army supplies, in addition to 317 mules bound for Burma.

Searches were conducted by all available aircraft from the Royal Australian Air Force (RAAF), United States Navy (USN), and ships of the USN, Australian and British navies. Within two days, 15 survivors in a lifeboat were picked up by the American steam merchant Cape Edmont and landed at Fremantle, Australia on February 12, 1945. The following day (February 13), 80 survivors on six rafts, and 12 survivors in a lifeboat, were picked up by USS Corpus Christi and brought to Fremantle after five days. On February 16, a Consolidated B-24L Liberator (A72-124), of 25 Sqn RAAF crashed at RAAF Cunderdin, while taking off to search, killing five of its 10 crew members. 20 survivors in a third boat were picked up on February 28, 1945 by HMS Activity (D 94) and landed at Fremantle on March 2, 1945. The last 15 survivors in another boat, adrift for 32 days, were rescued on March 9, 1945 by USS Rock (SS 274) and landed at Exmouth Gulf. The last lifeboat carrying 1 crewmen, 7 armed guards and 25 troops was lost.

The Peter Silvester was the last ship sunk by German U-boats in the Indian Ocean.

=== Survivors ===
Some of the survivors from the ship, that a rescued sailor wrote down.

- Harry Drosis (Merchant Marine) from Tujunga, California
- Ralph Eisman (Merchant Marine) from Inglewood, California
- Angelo V Giudice (Merchant Marine) from New York City
- Gene M Poole (Merchant Marine) from San Pedro, California
- Arthur Turner (Merchant Marine) from San Pedro, California
- Bruce McClaire (Merchant Marine) from Los Angeles, California - 2nd engineer
- Robert Weaver (Merchant Marine) from Los Angeles, California
- Pvt Ray Laemen (US Army) from Detroit, Michigan
- Pvt Joe Kamertz (US Army) from Phoenixville, Pennsylvania
- Pvt Tommy Movowski (US Army) from Detroit, Michigan
- Pvt Henry Cieslak (US Army) from Detroit, Michigan
- Pvt Walter Graham (US Army) from Burton, Ohio
- Capt Charlie P Hatfield (US Army) from Arlington, California
- GM3/c James A Saucier (US Army) from New Orleans, Louisiana
- S1/c Richard Butler (US Army) from Cedar Ridge, California
- S1/c M. D. Copeland (US Army) from Pembroke, Georgia
- Jack Easley 2nd mate (Merchant Marine) from San Pedro, California
- S1/c Jerry Poole (US Army) from Horatio, Arkansas
- Capt Bernard C. Dennis (Merchant Marine) from San Pedro, California
- Larry Casselli (US Army) from Grass Valley, California
- Dick Sproul (US Army) from Yakima, Washington
- T/4 Chester Lee Hixson (US Army Air Forces) from Charlotte, North Carolina
- Pvt Tom Spicketts (US Army)
- Pvt Tom Tschirhart (US Army)

Other survivors

- Clay Fultz from Minnesota
- Don Tuthill from Michigan
- Tom Morawski from Michigan
- Ray Laenen from Michigan
- John Sussex from Goodland, Kansas

== See also ==
- USS Corpus Christi
- Peter Silvester (1734–1808)
- List of Liberty ships
- List of shipwrecks in February 1945
