= SS Iron Knight =

SS Iron Knight may refer to the following steamships:

- SS Iron Knight (1937), the first Iron Knight of BHP Shipping
- SS Venissieux, later the second Iron Knight of BHP Shipping
