= SS Mulbera =

British cargo liner that served East Africa

History

United Kingdom
- Name: Mulbera
- Owner: British India SN Co
- Port of registry: Glasgow
- Route: London – Suez Canal – Beira; London – Suez Canal – Calcutta
- Builder: A Stephen & Sons, Linthouse
- Cost: £511,000
- Yard number: 496
- Launched: 14 February 1922
- Completed: 21 June 1922
- Identification: UK official number 146298; until 1933: code letters KMGR; by 1930: call sign GFTM
- Fate: Scrapped, April 1954

General characteristics
- Class & type: "M" class cargo liner
- Tonnage: 9,100 GRT, 5,521 NRT, 10,950 DWT
- Length: 483.0 ft (147.2 m) overall; 466.3 ft (142.1 m) registered
- Beam: 60.1 ft (18.3 m)
- Draught: 28 ft 4 in (8.64 m)
- Depth: 33.3 ft (10.1 m)
- Decks: 2
- Installed power: 1,068 NHP, 4,100 bhp
- Propulsion: 6 × steam turbines; double reduction gearing; 2 × screws
- Speed: 13.58 knots (25.15 km/h)
- Capacity: 1922: 1st & 2nd class passengers; 1935: 158 passengers in one class
- Sensors & processing systems: as built: submarine signalling; by 1928: wireless direction finding; by 1949: radar
- Armament: DEMS in the Second World War
- Notes: sister ships: Modasa, Madura, Mantola, Malda, Matiana

SS Mulbera was a British India Steam Navigation Company (BI) turbine steamship that was built in 1922 and scrapped in 1954. She belonged to BI's "M" class of cargo liners. She was the last member of the class to be built, and the last to survive in service.

Mulbera's regular route was between London and East Africa. In 1924 she took the then Duke and Duchess of York to Kenya.

This was the first of two BI ships to be called Mulbera. The second was a motor ship that was built in 1971, renamed in 1975, sold in 1982, and scrapped in 1992.

== "M" class ships ==
Between 1913 and 1917 BI took delivery of nine "M" class twin-screw steamships: seven built by Barclay, Curle & Co in Glasgow, Scotland, and two by Swan, Hunter and Wigham Richardson in Wallsend, England. Enemy action sank four of these in the First World War.

In 1920 Barclay, Curle built two more "M" class ships. The first, Mashobra, had triple expansion engines like her predecessors. The second, Manela, was the first member of the class to have steam turbines instead. They drove her twin propeller shafts via double-reduction gearing.

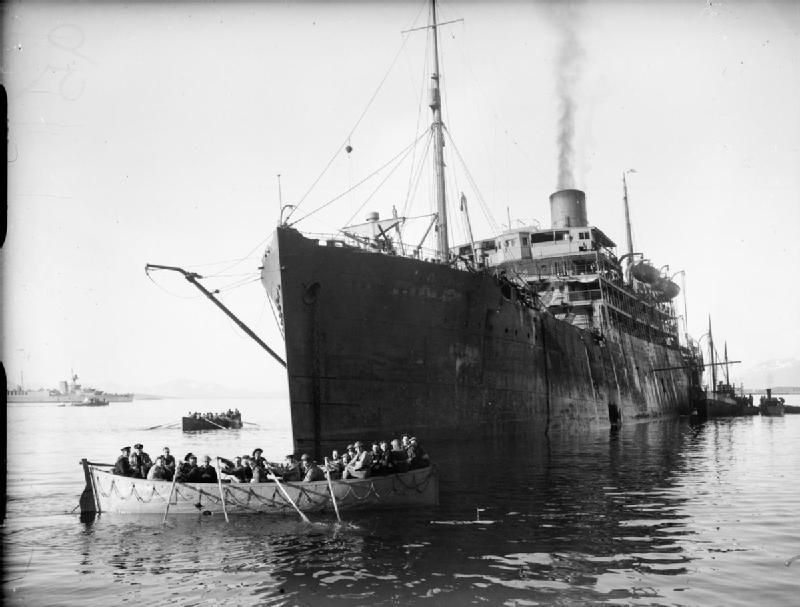
Mashobra, an "M" class ship built in 1920

In 1921 and 1922 BI took delivery of a final six "M" class ships, all with geared steam turbines. They were about 20 feet (6 m) longer overall (about 16 feet (5 m) longer registered) than earlier members of the class, and had a cruiser stern instead of a counter stern. Swan, Hunter and Wigham Richardson built Modana, the first of this batch. Barclay, Curle built four: Madura, Mantola, Matiana, and Malda. Mulbera was unique, being the only "M" class ship built by Alexander Stephen and Sons.

== Building Mulbera ==
Stephen's built Mulbera at Linthouse in Glasgow for £511,000 as yard number 496. She was launched on 14 February 1922 and completed on 6 June. Her lengths were 483.0 ft (147.2 m) overall and 466.3 ft (142.1 m) registered. Her beam was 60.1 ft (18.3 m), her depth was 33.3 ft (10.1 m), and her draught was 28 ft 4 in (8.64 m). Her tonnages were 9,100 GRT, 5,521 NRT, and 10,950 DWT.

As built, Mulbera carried both first class and second class passengers. Some sources state that she had berths for 78 first class and 80 second class, but another states that it was 114 first class and 44 second class.

Each of her twin screws was driven by a set of three-stage Parsons steam turbines. The combined power of her turbines was rated at 1,068 NHP or 4,100 bhp. She achieved 13.58 knots (25.15 km/h) on her sea trials. As built, her navigation equipment included submarine signalling. By 1928 it also included wireless direction finding.

BI registered Mulbera at Glasgow. Her United Kingdom official number was 146298 and her code letters were KMGR. She was equipped for wireless telegraphy. By 1930 her call sign was GFTM. By 1934 this call sign had superseded her code letters.

== Peacetime career ==
Mulbera at first worked BI's route between London and Beira via the Suez Canal. This route's regular ports of call were Gibraltar, Marseille, Port Said, Port Sudan, Aden, Mombasa, Zanzibar, Dar es Salaam. From December 1924 to April 1925, the Duke and Duchess of York toured Kenya, Uganda, and Sudan. They joined Mulbera at Marseille and sailed on her as far as Mombasa.

Victoria Drummond, the first woman to qualify as an engineer officer in the UK, served on Mulbera from April 1927 until December 1928. But BI hired her only as Fifth Engineer, despite her being qualified as a Second Engineer. While Drummond served on her, Mulbera made one voyage to East Africa, and four to India and Ceylon. BI's regular ports of call on this route were Gibraltar, Marseille, Port Said, Suez, Aden, Colombo, Madras (now Chennai) and Calcutta.

On 8 June 1932 Mulbera collided with the British steamship Zitella at Kruisschans Scluis when approaching Antwerp. On 11 October that year she grazed the pier head while entering King George V Dock, London. She knocked some facing tiles off the pier, but suffered little damage.

On 22 August 1933 she grounded on Ulenge Reef off Tanga, Tanganyika. With help from the BI ship Dumra and tug Kifaru she was refloated on 24 August. The friability of the coral reef prevented major damage to the ship.

In 1935 Mulbera was converted into a one-class ship, with berths for 158 passengers.

== Second World War ==
In the Second World War Mulbera remained in passenger service, but under the direction of the British Indian government. In March 1940 she was requisitioned for the Liner Division.

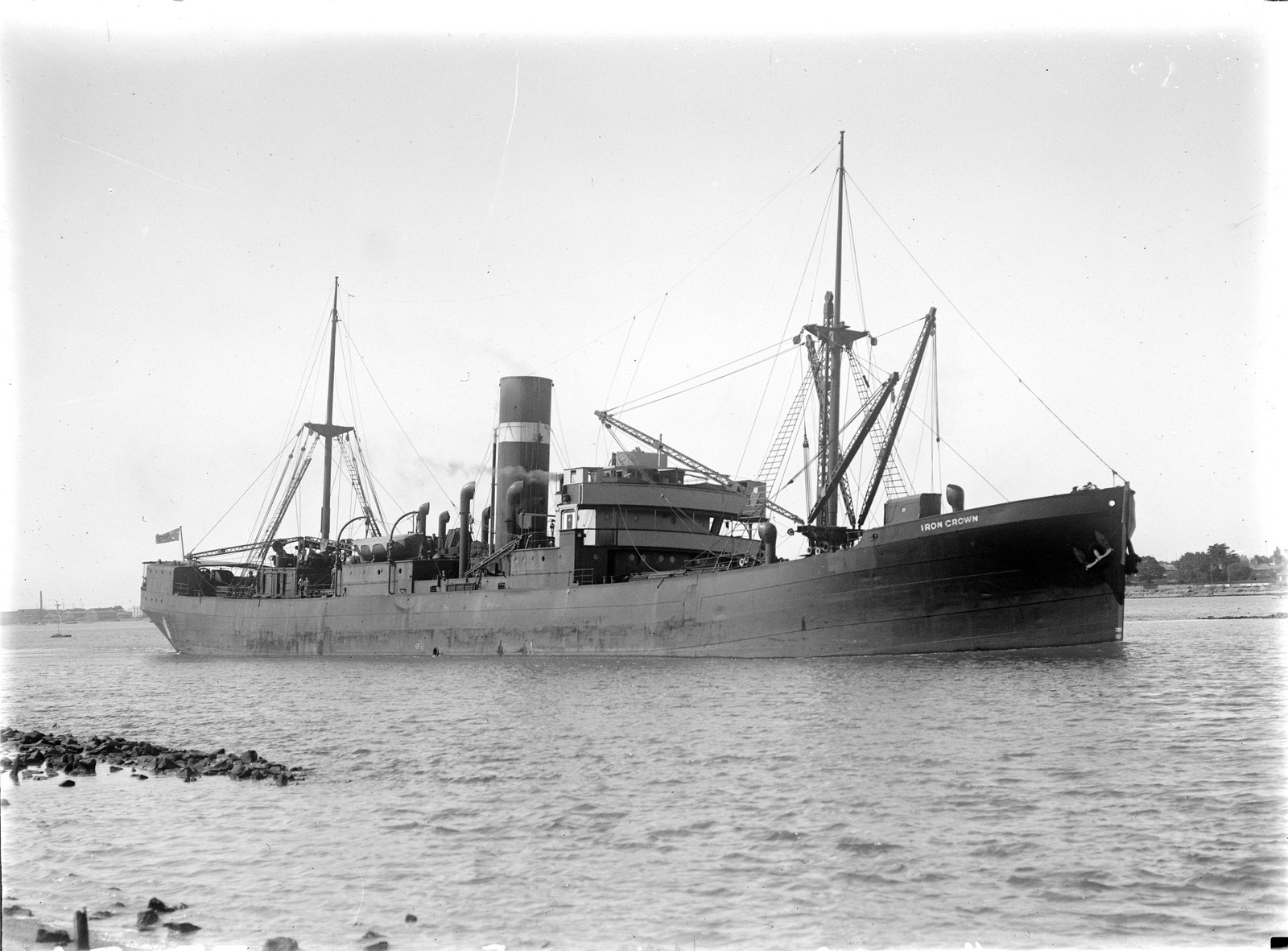
Iron Crown, whose survivors Mulbera rescued in 1942

On 4 June 1942 the Japanese submarine I-27 torpedoed the Australian ore carrier Iron Crown about 44 nautical miles (81 km) south-southwest of Gabo Island, New South Wales. She sank in less than a minute, killing her Master, 36 of her crew, and a DEMS gunner. Mulbera rescued five survivors.

== Final years ==
In 1946 Mulbera resumed commercial service. In 1949 she returned to BI's East Africa route. By that year she was equipped with radar.

On 7 April 1954 BI sold Mulbera for £64,000 to the British Iron & Steel Corporation. She went to Inverkeithing on the Firth of Forth, where Thos. W. Ward scrapped her. She was the last survivor of the "M" class.

== Bibliography ==
- Drummond, Cherry (1994). The Remarkable Life of Victoria Drummond – Marine Engineer. London: Institute of Marine Engineers. ISBN 0-907206-54-9.
- Haws, Duncan (1987). British India S.N. Co. Merchant Fleets. Vol. 11. Burwash: Travel Creatours Ltd Publications. ISBN 0-946378-07-X.
- Judd, Denis (1982). King George VI. London: Michael Joseph. ISBN 978-0-7181-2184-6.
- Lloyd's Register of Shipping. Vol. II.–Steamers and Motor Vessels. London: Lloyd's Register of Shipping. 1922 – via Internet Archive.
- Lloyd's Register of Shipping. Vol. II.–Steamers and Motorships. London: Lloyd's Register of Shipping. 1928 – via Internet Archive.
- Lloyd's Register of Shipping (PDF). Vol. II.–Steamers and Motorships of 300 tons gross and over. London: Lloyd's Register of Shipping. 1934 – via Southampton City Council.
- Mercantile Navy List. London. 1923 – via Crew List Index Project.
- Mercantile Navy List. London. 1930 – via Crew List Index Project.
- Register Book. Vol. II. M–Z. London: Lloyd's Register of Shipping. 1949 – via Internet Archive.
