= List of shipwrecks in May 1853 =

The list of shipwrecks in May 1853 includes ships sunk, foundered, wrecked, grounded, or otherwise lost during May 1853.

== 1 May ==
List of shipwrecks: 1 May 1853
Ship	State	Description
Emu	(United Kingdom of Great Britain and Ireland) South Australia	The schooner was wrecked at Port Elliott with the loss of all three crew. She was on a voyage from Port Elliott to Port Adelaide.
Larriston	United Kingdom	The steamship was wrecked on rocks off Turnabout Island with the loss of 31 of her crew. She was on a voyage from Shanghai to Hong Kong.
Liverpool Packet	United Kingdom	The ship was in collision with Bijou (United Kingdom) and foundered off Holyhead, Anglesey. Her crew were rescued. She was on a voyage from Barrow in Furness, Lancashire to Cardiff, Glamorgan.
Rob the Ranter	United Kingdom	The ship was driven ashore and damaged at Galway. She was refloated.
Witness	United Kingdom	The schooner was wrecked on Cape Northumberland, South Australia. She was on a voyage from Adelaide, South Australia to Melbourne, Victoria.

== 2 May ==
List of shipwrecks: 2 May 1853
Ship	State	Description
Betsey and James	United Kingdom	The brig ran aground on the Scroby Sand, Norfolk. She was on a voyage from Newcastle upon Tyne, Northumberland to London. She was refloated and resumed her voyage.
Elisha Denison	United States	The ship was wrecked at Galveston, Texas. She was on a voyage from New Orleans, Louisiana to Havre de Grâce, Seine-Inférieure, France.
Elizabeth	United Kingdom	The pilot skiff was wrecked on Flat Holm, in the Bristol Channel. Her crew were rescued.
Hoffnung	(flag) Prussia	The ship was driven ashore whilst on a voyage from Danzig to Queenstown, County Cork, United Kingdom. She was refloated and put in to Ystad, Sweden in a leaky condition.
Jean and Mary	United Kingdom	The brig struck sunken rocks off Sheringham, Norfolk and was consequently beached at Cromer, Norfolk, where she was wrecked. She was on a voyage from Newcastle upon Tyne to Dordrecht, South Holland, Netherlands.
Ocean Nymph	United States	The schooner was run down by ship "Sarah Jane" off Cape Cod. Crew saved.

== 3 May ==
List of shipwrecks: 3 May 1853
Ship	State	Description
Mary and Ellen	United Kingdom	The ship ran aground on the Cross Sand, in the North Sea off the coast of Suffolk. She was refloated and assisted in to Lowestoft, Suffolk in a leaky condition.
Minerve	France	The schooner ran aground on the Haisborough Sands, in the North Sea off the coast of Norfolk. She floated off and sank. Her crew were rescued by the brig Suffolk (United Kingdom). Minerve was on a voyage from Warkworth, Northumberland to Barfleur, Manche.
Owen	United Kingdom	The ship was driven ashore and wrecked near Amlwch, Anglesey.
Thomas	United Kingdom	The ship was driven ashore at Fast Castle Head, Lothian. Her crew were rescued. She was on a voyage from Arbroath, Forfarshire to Newcastle upon Tyne, Northumberland.
William and Mary	United States	The barque was wrecked on the Stirrup Key, Bahamas with the reported loss of about 170 lives. She was on a voyage from Liverpool, Lancashire, United Kingdom to New Orleans, Louisiana. Survivors were rescued by the brig Reuben Carver (United States) and the barque Pollock (United Kingdom). Also reported that all but two passengers had been rescued by the schooner Oracle ( (United Kingdom of Great Britain and Ireland) Bahamas).

== 4 May ==
List of shipwrecks: 4 May 1853
Ship	State	Description
Cecile	France	The ship foundered 2 nautical miles (3.7 km) off Penmarc'h, Finistère with the loss of three of her crew. She was on a voyage from Cardiff, Glamorgan, United Kingdom to Nantes, Loire-Inférieure.
Jean and Mary	United Kingdom	The ship was driven ashore and wrecked at Flamborough Head, Yorkshire. She was on a voyage from Saint-Valery-sur-Somme, Somme, France to Newcastle upon Tyne, Northumberland.
Lady Berridale	United Kingdom	The steamship was in collision with Jean and Mary (United Kingdom) and sank at Lowestoft, Suffolk, or Sunderland, County Durham.
Roscoe	United Kingdom	The ship was driven ashore and severely damaged at Sunderland, County Durham. She was on a voyage from London to Sunderland.
Sharon's Rose	United Kingdom	The sloop ran aground on the Haisborough Sands, in the North Sea off the coast of Norfolk and sank. Her crew took to a boat and were rescued by William and Ann (United Kingdom). Sharon's Rose was on a voyage from Newcastle upon Tyne to London.

== 5 May ==
List of shipwrecks: 5 May 1853
Ship	State	Description
Barbara Gordon	(United Kingdom of Great Britain and Ireland) South Australia	The barque was wrecked 20 nautical miles (37 km) west of Cape Agulhas, Cape Colony with the loss of all six passengers. She was on a voyage from Port Adelaide to London.
Moldavia	Ottoman Empire	The ship was driven ashore at Dublin, United Kingdom.
Pelicanos	Greece	The brig was driven ashore and wrecked at The Lizard, Cornwall, United Kingdom. Her crew were rescued. She was on a voyage from Odesa to Bridgwater, Somerset, United Kingdom.
Sarah S.	(United Kingdom of Great Britain and Ireland) British North America	The brig foundered in the Atlantic Ocean. All on board were rescued by the barque Durango (United Kingdom). Sarah S. was on a voyage from the Clyde to New York, United States.

== 6 May ==
List of shipwrecks: 6 May 1853
Ship	State	Description
USS Michigan	United States Navy	The patrol vessel was rammed and severely damaged in Lake Huron by Buffalo ( Pirates) and was severely damaged. Buffalo was captured. USS Michigan was repaired and returned to service.

== 7 May ==
List of shipwrecks: 7 May 1853
Ship	State	Description
Active	United Kingdom	The ship struck a sunken wreck and sank off Cardiff, Glamorgan. Her crew were rescued. She was on a voyage from Newport, Monmouthshire to Plymouth, Devon.
Southampton	United Kingdom	The sailing barge was run down and sunk in the River Thames by the steamship Trident (United Kingdom). Southampton was on a voyage from Crayford, Kent to Pimlico, City of Westminster.

== 8 May ==
List of shipwrecks: 8 May 1853
Ship	State	Description
Francesca	United Kingdom	The brig foundered in the Atlantic Ocean. Her crew were rescued by the brig Irene (Sweden). Francesca was on a voyage from Saint Vincent to Australia.
Madonna delle Grazie	Kingdom of the Two Sicilies	The brig was wrecked on the Paganetto Flats with the loss of three of her crew. She was on a voyage from Naples to Hull, Yorkshire, United Kingdom.

== 9 May ==
List of shipwrecks: 9 May 1853
Ship	State	Description
Balmira	Portugal	The schooner was in collision with Star of the West (United Kingdom) and sank in the Irish Sea off Holyhead, Anglesey, United Kingdom with the loss of two of her crew. She was on a voyage from São Miguel Island, Azores to Liverpool, Lancashire, United Kingdom.
Bretagne	United Kingdom	The ship ran aground at Saint-Nazaire, Loire-Inférieure and was damaged. She was on a voyage from London, United Kingdom to Saint-Nazaire.
Louise	Belgium	The barque ran aground on the Goodwin Sands, Kent, United Kingdom. She was refloated and resumed her voyage.
Margaret	United Kingdom	The brig ran aground in Carlington Bay. She was on a voyage from Drogheda, County Louth to Workington, Cumberland. She was refloated and taken in to Greencastle, County Down.
Matanzas	United Kingdom	The ship ran aground at Bahia, Brazil. She was on a voyage from Rio de Janeiro to Bahia. She was refloated and taken in to Bahia.
Palmira	Portugal	The schooner was in collision with Star of the West (United Kingdom) and sank off Holyhead, Anglesey, United Kingdom with the loss of two of her crew. She was on a voyage from São Miguel Island, Azores to Liverpool, Lancashire, United States.

== 10 May ==
List of shipwrecks: 10 May 1853
Ship	State	Description
Adam Clark	United Kingdom	The ship was in collision with Blanche (United Kingdom) and sank in the North Sea off Flamborough Head, Yorkshire. Her crew were rescued by Blanche.
Fadrens Minde	(Russian Empire) Grand Duchy of Finland	The ship ran aground on the Lapsand, in the Baltic Sea. She was on a voyage from Newcastle upon Tyne, Northumberland, United Kingdom to Turku. She was refloated.
Superior	United Kingdom	The sloop ran aground on Scroby Sands, Norfolk. She was abandoned the next day. She was on a voyage from Woodbridge, Suffolk to Goole, Yorkshire.
Supply	United Kingdom	The ship was driven ashore at Helsingør, Denmark. She was on a voyage from Liverpool, Lancashire to Kronstadt, Russia. She was refloated and resumed her voyage.

== 11 May ==
List of shipwrecks: 11 May 1853
Ship	State	Description
Adam Clark	United Kingdom	The brig was in collision with another vessel and was abandoned by her crew. She subsequently came ashore on the Holderness coast of Yorkshihre.

== 12 May ==
List of shipwrecks: 12 May 1853
Ship	State	Description
Elizabeth and Sarah	United Kingdom	The barque ran aground near Dragør, Denmark. She was on a voyage from Newcastle upon Tyne, Northumberland to Kronstadt, Russia. She was refloated and resumed her voyage.
Horatio	Flag unknown	The ship was wrecked on the Goodwin Sands, Kent, United Kingdom. She was on a voyage from Odesa to Bremen.
San Francisco	Spain	The ship ran aground on the Goodwin Sands.
Smiths	United Kingdom	The ship ran aground on the Monkstone. She was on a voyage from Newport, Monmouthshire to cork. She was refloated and towed in to the River Taff in a sinking condition.
Vigilant	United Kingdom	The ship was driven ashore at Douglas, Isle of Man. She was on a voyage from Portmadoc, Caernarfonshire to Aberdeen.
William and Mary	United Kingdom	The schooner collided with the sloop Lily and foundered in the North Sea off Lowestoft, Suffolk with the loss of two of her four crew. One of the survivors was rescued by Glenmoriston (United Kingdom).

== 13 May ==
List of shipwrecks: 13 May 1853
Ship	State	Description
Bogida	Norway	The ship ran aground and was damaged. She was on a voyage from Folkestone, Kent, United Kingdom to Porsgrunn. She was refloated and put in to Dover, Kent in a leaky condition.
Friends	United Kingdom	The ship sprang a leak and foundered in the Solent off the Hurst Spit. Her crew were rescued. She was on a voyage from Fareham, Hampshire to Yarmouth, Isle of Wight.
Providence	United Kingdom	The schooner collided with the schooner Gem (United Kingdom) and foundered in the North Sea off the north coast of Norfolk. Her crew were rescued by Gem. Providence was on a voyage from Hartlepool, County Durham to London.
William and Mary	United Kingdom	The schooner was in collision with the sloop Lily (United Kingdom) and foundered in the North Sea off the coast of Suffolk. One of her crew was rescued by Lily, the rest were presumed to have drowned.

== 14 May ==
List of shipwrecks: 14 May 1853
Ship	State	Description
Caledonia	United Kingdom	The ship ran aground on Nickman's Grounds, in the Baltic Sea. She was on a voyage from Hartlepool, County Durham to Kronstadt, Russia. She was refloated and taken in to Kronstadt in a leaky condition.
Mary Ellen	(United Kingdom of Great Britain and Ireland) British North America	The ship collided with Mermaid (United States) and was abandoned. Her crew were rescued. She was on a voyage from Halifax, Nova Scoti to Saint John, New Brunswick. Mary Ellen was subsequently towed in to Yarmouth, Nova Scotia.

== 15 May ==
List of shipwrecks: 15 May 1853
Ship	State	Description
Anna Geza	Hamburg	The galiot ran aground on the Gunfleet Sand, in the North Sea off the coast of Essex, United Kingdom. She was refloated with assistance from the smacks Agenoria, Celerity and Rumney (all United Kingdom) and taken in tow, but consequently capsized and sank in the Rolling Grounds. Her crew were rescued. She was on a voyage from Blankenese Hoyer to Shoreham-by-Sea, Sussex, United Kingdom.
Chusan	United Kingdom	The ship sprang a leak and was abandoned 200 nautical miles (370 km) north of Cape Frio, Brazil. Ten of her sixteen crew reached land, the rest were rescued by Sophia (United Kingdom). Chusan was on a voyage from Sunderland, County Durham to California, United States.
Le Jeune Louis	France	The lugger ran aground on the Long Bank, in the Irish Sea. She was on a voyage from Marans, Charente-Inférieure to Wexford, United Kingdom. She was refloated the next day and taken in to Wexford in a leaky condition.
Monumental City	United States	The steamship was wrecked on Tullaberga Island, Victoria with the loss of 37 of the 91 people on board. She was on a voyage from Port Phillip, Victoria to Sydney, New South Wales.
Winchester	United Kingdom	The barque was destroyed by fire. Her crew survived. She was on a voyage from Melbourne, Victoria to Newcastle, New South Wales.

== 16 May ==
List of shipwrecks: 16 May 1853
Ship	State	Description
Carshalton Park	United Kingdom	The ship was wrecked at a port in Sierra Leone. Her crew were rescued.

== 17 May ==
List of shipwrecks: 17 May 1853
Ship	State	Description
Caroline	Hamburg	The ship was wrecked on the Rock Donares, Jersey. She was on a voyage from Paraíba, Brazil to Hamburg.
Emilie	Prussia	The brig ran aground on the Beacon Rock, in the River Tay. She was on a voyage from Stettin to Dundee, Forfarshire, United Kingdom.

== 18 May ==
List of shipwrecks: 18 May 1853
Ship	State	Description
Anne Mackay	United Kingdom	The ship ran aground in the Somme. She was on a voyage from Newcastle upon Tyne, Northumberland to the Somme. She was refloated.

== 19 May ==
List of shipwrecks: 19 May 1853
Ship	State	Description
Argyle	United Kingdom	The barque foundered off the coast of Newfoundland, British North America with the loss of fifteen of the 25 people on board. Survivors were rescued by the brig Harmony (France). Argyle was on a voyage from London to Quebec City, Province of Canada, British North America.
Mary Ann	United Kingdom	The schooner ran aground and capsized at Hartlepool, County Durham. She was righted and found to be severely damaged.

== 20 May ==
List of shipwrecks: 20 May 1853
Ship	State	Description
Aurora	United Kingdom	The barque foundered in the Atlantic Ocean (45°50′N 38°00′W) with the loss of 26 of the 42 people on board. Thirteen survivors were rescued by Volusia (United Kingdom), three survivors were reported missing. Aurora was on a voyage from Hull, Yorkshire to New York, United States.
Collingwood	United Kingdom	The ship was driven ashore at Bathurst, New Brunswick, British North America. Her crew were rescued. She was on a voyage from Ayr to Dalhousie, New Brunswick.
Lamb	United Kingdom	The sloop was driven ashore at Cramond, Lothian. She floated off but consequently sank. Her crew were rescued.

== 21 May ==
List of shipwrecks: 21 May 1853
Ship	State	Description
Field Marshal Radetzky	Kingdom of Lombardy–Venetia	The ship was in collision with George (United Kingdom) and sank in the Mediterranean Sea. Her crew were rescued by George. Field Marshal Radetzky was on a voyage from Alexandria, Egypt to London, United Kingdom.
Oriental Queen	United Kingdom	The ship was wrecked on the coast of Victoria.
Venus	United Kingdom	The ship sank in Ramsey Bay.

== 22 May ==
List of shipwrecks: 22 May 1853
Ship	State	Description
Pasco Guimaracus	Chile	The ship was lost in the Bay of Valdivia.
Wilhelm	Russia	The ship ran aground on the Goodwin Sands, Kent, United Kingdom. She was on a voyage from Torrevecchia Teatina, Papal States to Riga. She was refloated.

== 23 May ==
List of shipwrecks: 23 May 1853
Ship	State	Description
Bonne Mere	France	The ship was wrecked at Barcelona, Spain. She was on a voyage from London, United Kingdom to Barcelona.
Eliza Leishman	United Kingdom	The ship was wrecked on Rathlin Island, County Donegal. She was on a voyage form Glasgow, Renfrewshire to Port Phillip, Victoria.
Frisk	United Kingdom	The ship was wrecked at the Melbourne Heads. She was on a voyage from Liverpool, Lancashire to Melbourne, Victoria.

== 24 May ==
List of shipwrecks: 24 May 1853
Ship	State	Description
Anthi	Greece	The brig was wrecked on the Kentish Knock, or on the Longsand, in the North Sea off the coast of Essex, United Kingdom. Six of her twelve crew were rescued by a fishing smack, the rest by the steamship Vivid (United Kingdom). Anthi was on a voyage from Newcastle upon Tyne, Northumberland, United Kingdom to Venice, Kingdom of Lombardy–Venetia .
Fagens Minde, or Krogers Minde	Norway	The ship ran aground and was damaged at Wisbech, Cambridgeshire, United Kingdom. She was on a voyage from "Veile" to Wisbech.
Utility	United Kingdom	The brig was driven ashore at Ness Point, Suffolk. She was on a voyage from Seaham, County Durham to London or vice versa. She was refloated on 9 June and towed in to Lowestoft, Suffolk.

== 25 May ==
List of shipwrecks: 25 May 1853
Ship	State	Description
Arendina	Netherlands	The sloop ran aground on the Stoney Binks, in the North Sea off the mouth of the Humber and broke her back. She was on a voyage from Newcastle upon Tyne, Northumberland to Grimsby, Lincolnshire, United Kingdom. She was refloated and taken in to Grimsby.
Catharine	United Kingdom	The ship ran aground off Cape Spartel, Morocco. She was on a voyage from Newcastle upon Tyne, Northumberland to Cartagena, Spain.
Stewarts	United Kingdom	The ship was driven ashore on Sancti Petri, Spain with the loss of seven of her twelve crew. She was on a voyage from South Shields, County Durham to Cartagena, Spain.

== 26 May ==
List of shipwrecks: 26 May 1853
Ship	State	Description
Catherine	United Kingdom	The ship was driven ashore 4 nautical miles (7.4 km) south of "Cape Sharvel", Spain. She was on a voyage from Newcastle upon Tyne, Northumberland to Cartagena, Spain. She was later refloated and towed in to Gibraltar Bay, where she arrived on 5 June.
Catherine Ellen	United Kingdom	The ship sprang a leak, capsized, exploded and sank 14 nautical miles (26 km) off Cardigan Head. All on board survived. She was on a voyage from Newport, Monmouthshire to Liverpool, Lancashire.
Good Intent	United Kingdom	The sloop sprang a leak off Inchcolm. She was on a voyage from Grangemouth, Stirlingshire to Newcastle upon Tyne, Northumberland. She put in to Burntisland, Fife, where she sank. Her crew were rescued. Good Intent was refloated on 8 June and founde to be severely damaged.

== 27 May ==
List of shipwrecks: 27 May 1853
Ship	State	Description
Neptune	United Kingdom	The steamship was wrecked on Neckman's Ground, in the Baltic Sea. All on board survived. Some of the survivors were rescued by the steamship Emperor (United Kingdom). Neptune was on a voyage from London to Saint Petersburg, Russia.
Victoria	(United Kingdom of Great Britain and Ireland) Victoria	The barque was wrecked in the Torres Strait. All on board reached Booby Island, New South Wales. They were subsequently rescued by Blackheath and Trafalgar (both United Kingdom). Victoria was on a voyage from Port Phillip to Mauritius.

== 28 May ==
List of shipwrecks: 28 May 1853
Ship	State	Description
Edina	United Kingdom	The barque was driven ashore at Scarborough, Yorkshire. She was on a voyage from Newcastle upon Tyne, Northumberland to Cartagena, Spain. She was refloated and resumed her voyage.
Frisk	United Kingdom	The ship was wrecked at the Melbourne Heads, New South Wales. She was on a voyage from Liverpool, Lancashire to Melbourne.

== 29 May ==
List of shipwrecks: 29 May 1853
Ship	State	Description
Earl of Durham	United Kingdom	The ship struck the Pearl Rock, in the Strait of Gibraltar. She was on a voyage from Odesa to Queenstown, County Cork. She was refloated and resumed her voyage.
Elizabeth	United Kingdom	The ship sank in the Zebra Channel. She was refloated on 10 June and beached at Bootle, Lancashire.
Norden	Norway	The barque sank at Tibbit's Cove, Province of Canada. Some of her crew were reported missing. She was refloated in late June and towed in to Quebec City.
St. Pierre	(United Kingdom of Great Britain and Ireland) British North America	The steamship suffered a boiler explosion and sank at Gilmour's Cove, Province of Canada. Eight of the ten people on board were killed.

== 30 May ==
List of shipwrecks: 30 May 1853
Ship	State	Description
Elizabeth	United Kingdom	The schooner sank in the Zebra Channel. She was refloated on 10 June and beached at Bootle, Lancashire.
Johannes	Kingdom of Hanover	The galiot was in collision with Ruthinia (United Kingdom) and sank in the Mediterranean Sea. Her crew were rescued. She was on a voyage from Tunis, Beylik of Tunis to London, United Kingdom.

== 31 May ==
List of shipwrecks: 31 May 1853
Ship	State	Description
Canton	United Kingdom	The ship was in company with Sir Edward Hamilton on a voyage from Hull to St Petersburg when they ran aground on Anholt. They were assisted off and were to proceed on their voyages.
Capodistria	Flag unknown	The ship ran aground at Malta. She was on a voyage from Taganrog, Russia to Malta. She was refloated the next day.
Olive Branch	United Kingdom	The ship was wrecked at White Head, near Louisbourg, Nova Scotia, British North America. Her crew were rescued. She was on a voyage from Sunderland, County Durham to Quebec City, Province of Canada, British North America.
Sea	United Kingdom	The ship was driven ashore and wrecked near Port Phillip, Victoria with the loss of seventeen of the 26 people on board and that of a rescuer.
Sir Edward Hamilton	United Kingdom	The ship was in company with Canton on a voyage from Hull to St Petersburg when they ran aground on Anholt. They were assisted off and were to proceed on their voyages.

== Unknown date ==
List of shipwrecks: Unknown date in May 1853
Ship	State	Description
Darling	United Kingdom	The schooner capsized at Stockton-on-Tees, County Durham and was damaged.
Duke of Manchester	United Kingdom	The ship foundered in the Atlantic Ocean. Her crew were rescued.
Fame	(United Kingdom of Great Britain and Ireland) British North America	The ship was driven ashore on Green Island. She was on a voyage from Halifax, Nova Scotia to Montreal, Province of Canada. She was later refloated and taken in to Quebec City, Province of Canada.
Generale Americano	Ottoman Empire	The ship ran aground at the entrance to the Bosphorus. She was on a voyage from Brăila to a British port. She was refloated and taken in to Constantinople, where she arrived on 28 May.
Harpe	Russia	The ship struck a sunken rock off the Barbary Coast. She was on a voyage from Queenstown, County Cork, United Kingdom to Constantinople, Ottoman Empire. She put in to Gibraltar on 6 May in a sinking condition.
Hellesmuth	Prussia	The brig ran aground at "Mullinasole", County Donegal, United Kingdom. She was refloated on 24 May and taken in to Belleisle, County Fermanagh.
Hoffnung	Danzig	The ship was driven ashore. She was on a voyage from Danzig to Queenstown. She was refloated and put in to Ystad, Sweden on 2 May.
Jean and Margaret	United Kingdom	The ship was driven ashore and wrecked at Flamborough Head, Yorkshire.
Malcolm Brown	United Kingdom	The ship was driven ashore at Cape Skala, Beylik of Tunis. She was refloated and resumed her voyage.
Outlaw	United Kingdom	The schooner was abandoned in the Atlantic Ocean before 4 May. Her crew were rescued. She was on a voyage from New York, United States to Halifax, Nova Scotia, British North America.
Prince Arthur	United Kingdom	The ship was wrecked south of Cape St. Augustine, Brazil before 21 May. She was on a voyage from Saint Helena to Pernambuco, Brazil.
Rio de Janeiro	Brazil	The steamship, a coaster caught fire, exploded and sank off Ilha Grande. All on board were rescued.
Sir H. Pottinger	United Kingdom	The ship ran aground on a reef off "Gaspar Island", Netherlands East Indies before 3 May. She was on a voyage from Liverpool, Lancashire to Shanghai, China. She was refloated on 4 May and resumed her voyage the next day.
Sir John Falstaff	United Kingdom	The ship ran aground on a coral reef. She was on a voyage from Liverpool to Jamaica and Cuba. She was later refloated and taken in to Matanzas, Cuba, where she arrived on 11 May.
Swallow	United Kingdom	The ship was wrecked in Wellkomst Bay with the loss of all but one of her crew. She was on a voyage from Singapore to Port Phillip, Victoria.
Waterwitch	United Kingdom	The steamship was driven ashore near Cádiz, Spain. She was on a voyage from Liverpool to Genoa, Kingdom of Sardinia and Livorno, Grand Duchy of Tuscany. She was refloated and put in to Gibraltar, where she arrived on 12 May in a leaky condition.
