= SS Iron Chieftain =

Iron ore carrier built 1937

Coordinates: 33°55.892′S 151°45.976′E

History

Australia
- Name: Iron Chieftain
- Owner: Broken Hill Pty
- Port of registry: Melbourne
- Builder: Lithgows, Port Glasgow
- Yard number: 903
- Launched: 22 October 1937
- Completed: December 1937
- Identification: UK official number 159570; call sign VLDK
- Fate: Sunk by torpedo, 3 June 1942

General characteristics
- Type: bulk carrier
- Tonnage: 4,812 GRT, 2,737 NRT, 8,130 DWT
- Length: 404.5 ft (123.3 m) registered
- Beam: 56.2 ft (17.1 m)
- Draught: 23 ft 9 in (7.24 m)
- Depth: 23.2 ft (7.1 m)
- Decks: 1
- Installed power: 553 NHP
- Propulsion: 1 × quadruple-expansion engine; 1 × exhaust steam turbine; 1 × screw
- Speed: 11 knots (20 km/h)
- Crew: 49
- Sensors & processing systems: echo sounding device
- Armament: DEMS
- Notes: sister ships: Iron Baron, Iron King, Iron Knight

SS Iron Chieftain was a bulk carrier that was built in Scotland in 1937 for the Australian Broken Hill Pty, Ltd (BHP) to carry iron ore. A Japanese submarine sank her by torpedo off the coast of New South Wales in 1942, killing 12 of her crew. Her wreck is protected by the Australian federal Underwater Cultural Heritage Act 2018.

== Building ==
In 1936 and 1937 Lithgows in Port Glasgow built four sister ships for BHP. Iron Baron and Iron King were launched in 1936. Iron Knight and Iron Chieftain were launched in 1937. Iron Chieftain was launched in 22 October and completed in December.

The four ships shared a similar layout, with a bridge and main superstructure amidships and engine room and funnel aft. All four ships had the same beam of 56.2 ft (17.1 m) and depth of 23.2 ft (7.1 m). Iron Knight and Iron Chieftain had a registered length of 404.5 ft (123.3 m), which was 11.3 ft (3.4 m) longer than Iron Baron and Iron King. Iron Chieftain's tonnages were 4,812 GRT and 2,737 NRT.

A Lithgows' subsidiary, David Rowan and Co of Glasgow, built the engines for all four sisters. Each ship had a single screw, driven by a quadruple-expansion steam engine, supplemented by an exhaust steam turbine driving a steam compressor. The exhaust turbine drove the same shaft as the piston engine. Between them, Iron Chieftain's piston engine and exhaust turbine were rated at 553 NHP and gave her a speed of 11 knots (20 km/h).

BHP registered Iron Chieftain in Melbourne. Her UK official number was 159570 and her call sign was VLJY.

== Second World War ==
Iron Chieftain carried iron ore in Australian coastal waters. Japanese submarines attacked shipping in Australian waters, and particularly off the coast of New South Wales. Ore carriers acquired a reputation as "death ships" because the density of their cargo caused them to sink too quickly for their crew to launch lifeboats. Life-rafts were fitted on sloping skids to be launched quickly.

At 1100 hrs on 3 June 1942 Iron Chieftain left Newcastle, laden with coke and materials for shipbuilding for shipyards at Whyalla, South Australia. That evening a heavy swell forced her to limit her speed to about 6 knots (11 km/h). At 2240 hrs that night she was about 27 nautical miles (50 km) east of Manly, NSW when a torpedo fired by I-24 hit her port side amidships. She sank quickly, and 12 of her crew were killed.

Iron Chieftain's crew launched her starboard lifeboat, with her Second Officer, Philip Brady, in command and carrying 24 other survivors. Another 12 crew survived on one of her life-rafts. On 4 June HMAS Bingera was sent from Sydney to search for survivors and found the 12 survivors on the life-raft. At 1800 hrs on 4 June the lifeboat reached land at The Entrance, New South Wales.

After the loss of Iron Chieftain on 3 June and another BHP ship, Iron Crown, on 4 June, convoys were introduced along the coast between New South Wales, Victoria and South Australia. On 8 June Convoy CO 1 left Newcastle for Whyalla, and on 10 June Convoy OC 1 left Melbourne for Newcastle.

== Monument ==
The Newcastle Merchant Mariners Memorial, outside Newcastle railway station, includes the names of the 12 members of the crew who were killed.
