= BHP Shipping =

Former Australian transport company

BHP Shipping was an Australian ship transport and shipbuilding arm of BHP.

BHP Shipping traces its origins to 1915 when BHP chartered the SS Emerald Wings to transport its first load of iron ore from Whyalla to Newcastle on 19 January 1915. In 1917, shipping agent William Scott Fell & Co arranged for BHP to purchase a share in the steamer SS Koolonga. BHP purchased the ship outright on 30 July 1918 and it was renamed SS Iron Monarch. The BHP Shipping Department was formed on that date, headed up by who had previously assisted in the shipping arrangements for the 1909 Nimrod Expedition and served on the Advisory Committee to the 1917 Ross Sea Party rescue. Captain William Halley, former master of the Emerald Wings, became Marine Superintendent of the Shipping Department. BHP Shipping was established as a subsidiary shipping line for the parent company in 1921.

As early as 1923 the company considered building its own ships but instead decided to manufacture steel hull plates, a major customer being the Commonwealth Shipping Line. However, in 1939 the company accepted a government request to establish a shipbuilding facility at Whyalla. By 1940 the BHP Whyalla Shipyard had five slipways capable of building ships up to 15,000GT. The first ship constructed at the shipyard was HMAS Whyalla. Between 1941 and 1978, the shipyard produced 63 vessels, of which 15 were built as BHP property. BHP shipping also chartered additional vessels constructed in Whyalla.

Following World War 2, BHP Shipping acquired more bulk carries to carry iron ore, coal and steel products. The ships increased in size up to the 1980s when demand for steel began to decline. From that time some of the ships were used to carry coal, coke and iron ore to export customers.

In December 1983, BHP Shipping was absorbed into BHP Transport Ltd.

BHP Shipping transferred wharves and shore operations to each refinery site ahead of the demerger of BlueScope in 2002. BlueScope also inherited several of the ships.

The remaining fleet is part of BHP Transport and Logistics Pty Ltd, a wholly owned subsidiary of BHP.

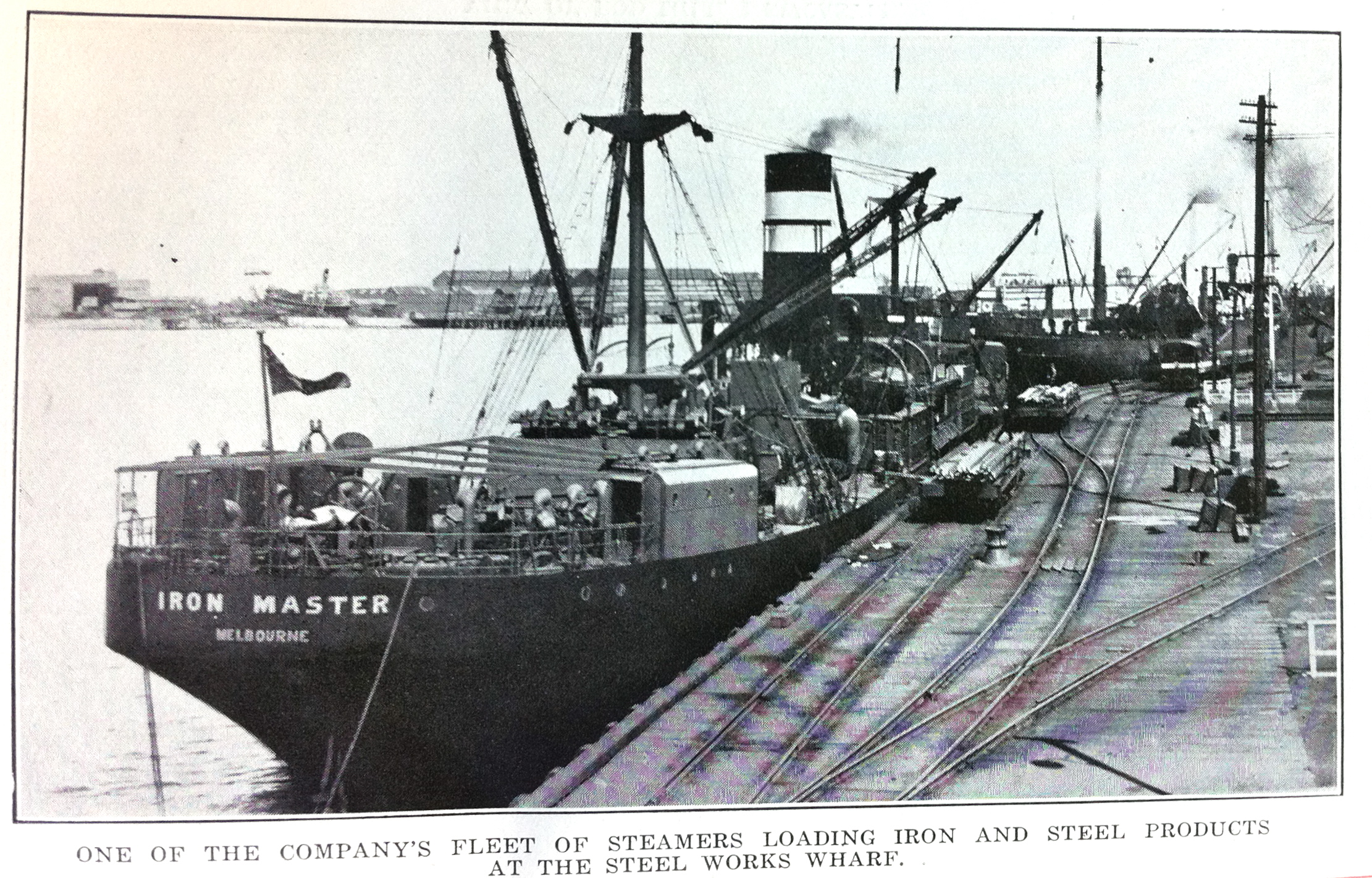
BHP ship SS Iron Master in 1930 at Melbourne.

== Fleet summary ==
Name	Type	Entered BHP service	Left BHP service	Disposition	Fate
SS Emerald Wings (later SS Iron Baron)	General cargo	1915 (chartered); 20 October 1919 (purchased)	13 November 1929	Sold to E B Aaby	Sank off Texel on 11 October 1955
SS Southborough	General cargo	1915 (chartered)	May 1918	Returned to Hazlewood Shipping Co Ltd	Sunk by German submarine U-110 off Scarborough on 16 July 1918
SS Iron Chief (1st)	General cargo	1916	1 April 1928		Wrecked off Diamond Head on 1 April 1928
SS Omana	General cargo	19 July 1917	21 July 1917	Returned to Omana S S Pty Co Ltd	Broken up July 1959
SS Koolonga (later SS Iron Monarch)	General cargo	October 1917 (part purchased); 30 July 1918 (purchased outright)	1937	Sold to Madrigal & Co	Bombed by US Navy aircraft in Manila Bay on 13 November 1944
SS Iron Prince (1st)	General cargo	1919	19 April 1923		Wrecked on Cape Howe
SS Grelwin (sometimes written as Grelwyn)	General cargo	August 1920	February 1921	Returned to Scott Fell Shipping Co	Unknown
SS Westborough	Steel cargo	September 1920	March 1924	Returned to Hopkins, Jones & Co	Sunk off Stavanger on 4 April 1943
SS Iron Knob	General cargo	9 October 1923	1955	Sold to Panatiotis Vrangos	Sank in heavy seas in the Indian Ocean on 15 July 1957
SS Iron Crown	General cargo	1923 (chartered)	1943		Sunk by Japanese submarine I-27 off Gabo Island on 4 June 1942
SS Iron Master	General cargo	9 October 1923	July 1957	Sold to Cambray Prince Steamship Co Ltd	Broken up March 1959
SS Iron Master (2nd)	Bulk cargo	16 November 1923	13 September 1945	Sold to Cambray Prince Steamship Co Ltd	Broken up December 1959
SS Iron Warrior (1st)	General cargo	1925	11 June 1957	Sold to Onfrio Jacomino	Sank off Cheung Chau during Typhoon Ruby on 5 September 1964
SS Iron Chief (2nd)	General cargo	1930	1934	Sold to Essex Oak	Sank off Dover on 13 June 1963
SS Iron Baron (2nd)	Ore carrier	1936	1966	Sold to Australia Pacific Shipping (H.K.) Ltd	Broken up in 1969
SS Iron King	Ore carrier	1936	1967	Sold to Golden Star Shipping Company	Broken up in 1970
SS Iron Chieftain	Ore carrier	1937	1942		Sunk by Japanese submarine I-24 off Manly on 3 June 1942
SS Iron Knight (1st)	Ore carrier	1937	1943		Sunk by Japanese submarine I-21 off Bermagui on 7 February 1943
SS Kenilworth	General cargo	1941	1947	Returned to Commonwealth Government Shipping Control Board	Broken up March 1959
SS Iron Monarch (2nd)	Ore carrier	28 March 1943	1972	Sold to Great Fareastern Ltd	Broken up October 1972
SS Iron Duke (originally SS Iron Duke II)	Ore carrier	28 March 1943	July 1970	Sold to Pac Trade Navigation Co	Broken up September 1971
SS Iron Yampi	General cargo	1 September 1947	26 September 1975	Sold to Nissho Iwai Co Ltd	Broken up November 1975
SS Iron Kimberley	General cargo	4 April 1949	September 1972	Sold to Wiltopps (Asia) Ltd	Broken up October 1972
SS Bellerby	General cargo	May 1950 (chartered)	May 1951	Returned to Scott Fell Shipping Co	Broken up January 1972
SS Iron Derby	General cargo	1951	January 1972	Sold to Wiltopps (Asia) Ltd	Broken up February 1972
SS Iron Wyndham	General cargo	1953	16 October 1976	Sold to Union Bros Marine Corp	Broken up January 1979
SS Iron Whyalla (1st)	General cargo	June 1954	1 June 1979	Sold to Selco (Hong Kong) Ltd	Broken up July 1979
SS Iron Knight (2nd)	General cargo	June 1955	1971	Sold to Great Fareastern Ltd	Broken up October 1971
SS Iron Spencer (1st)	Ore carrier	1957	27 September 1979	Sold to Jehow Trading Co	Broken up January 1980
SS Iron Flinders (1st)	Ore carrier	1959	November 1977	Sold to Goldwills (Hong Kong) Ltd	Broken up May 1978
SS Age	General cargo	July 1959 (chartered)	July 1968	Returned to Australian Steamships Pty Ltd	Wrecked off Paluan on 17 October 1970
SS Iron Dampier (1st)	Ore carrier	1961	1978	Sold to Goldwills (Hong Kong) Ltd	Broken up May 1978
SS Iron Warrior (2nd)	General cargo	March 1961	February 1975	Sold to Hi-Firm Corporation	Broken up July 1975
MV Iron Clipper	Bulk carrier	19 December 1964 (chartered)	June 1975	Returned to Anglo-Pacific Shipping Company Ltd	Broken up May 1984
MV Iron Cavalier	Bulk carrier	4 November 1965 (chartered)	June 1975	Returned to Anglo-Pacific Shipping Company Ltd	Broken up May 1984
SS Iron Hunter	Ore carrier	24 October 1968	23 July 1982	Sold to Saudi Pride Shipping Co Ltd	Broken up December 1982
MV Iron Endeavour	Panamax bulk carrier	1969 (chartered)	2 March 1983	Returned to Nile Steamships Company	Sank off Port Elizabeth on 26 May 1993
MV Iron Somersby	Bulk carrier	1971 (chartered)	14 December 1986	Returned to Ropner Shipping Co Ltd	Broken up April 1993
MV Iron Banbury	General cargo	1972 (chartered)	18 December 1975	Returned to Alexander Shipping Co Ltd	Broken up September 2001
MV Iron Baron (3rd)	General cargo	February 1972 (chartered); 4 March 1980 (purchased)	14 December 1986	Sold to Epping Marine Co Ltd	Broken up Obtober 1986
MV Iron Parkgate	Bulk carrier	June 1973 (chartered)	7 July 1986	Returned to Nytoncrest Pty Ltd	Broken up July 1985
MV Iron Sirius	Bulk carrier	October 1973 (chartered)	October 1974	Returned to Nytoncrest Pty Ltd	Broken up July 1986
MV Iron Monarch (3rd)	General cargo/ro-ro	12 September 1973	2002	Transferred to BlueScope	Broken up May 2012
MV Iron Duke (2nd)	General cargo/ro-ro	1974	10 January 1986	Sold to Loy Key Shipbreakers	Broken up April 1986
MV Iron Cumberland	Bulk carrier	June 1974 (chartered)	25 November 1986	Returned to Glentara Ltd	Sank near the Pitcairn Islands on 14 June 1987
MV Iron Arnhem	General cargo/ro-ro	10 October 1974	December 1990	Sold to Pacific International Lines Pty Ltd	Still in service
MV Iron York	General cargo/ro-ro	10 October 1974	29 May 1985	Sold to Pacific International Lines Pty Ltd	Broken up December 1999
MV Iron Kestrel	Bulk carrier	21 December 1974 (chartered)	29 May 1985	Returned to Ropner Shipping Co Ltd	Broken up Broken up May 2003
MV Iron Kerry-Kirby	Bulk carrier	21 December 1974 (chartered)	29 May 1985	Returned to Ropner Shipping Co Ltd	Broken up Broken up May 2003
MV Iron Capricorn	Bulk carrier	21 December 1974	15 October 1990	Sold to Athenian Faith S.A.	Still in service
MV Mundoora	General cargo	January 1975 (chartered)	January 1976	Returned to Associated Steamships	Sank in the Arabian Sea on 9 September 1984
MV Iron Mittagong	Ore carrier	8 December 1976 (chartered)	3 March 1982	Returned to Bulkships Ltd	Broken up December 1982
MV Iron Gerrigong	Ore carrier	20 December 1976 (chartered)	26 May 1978	Returned to Bulkships Ltd	Broken up October 1985
MV Iron Bogong	Bulk carrier	29 August 1977 (chartered); 14 January 1983 (purchased)	16 February 1983	Sold to China Dismantled Vessels Trading Corp	Broken up March 1983
MV Iron Carpentaria	Bulk carrier	April 1978	January 2003		Broken up December 2003
MV Iron Curtis	Bulk carrier	April 1978	January 2003		Broken up December 2003
MV Iron Shortland	Bulk carrier	1979	1996	Sold to Everbird Corporation N.V.	Broken up December 2005
MV Iron Sturt	Bulk chemical tanker	1979	10 February 2006	Sold to Jebsens Group	Broken up February 2011
MV Iron Myarra	Ore carrier	2 May 1980 (chartered)	7 May 1983	Returned to Alcoa Australia	Broken up October 1983
Iron Baron (4th)	Bulk carrier	1980	1995		Ran aground in the mouth of the Tamar River on 10 July 1995. Scuttled off Flinders Island on 30 July 1995
MV Iron Whyalla (2nd)	Bulk carrier	1981	26 January 2001	Sold to Marmaras Navigation	Broken up December 2009
MV Iron Spencer (2nd)	Bulk carrier	1981	March 2000	Sold to Marmaras Navigation	Broken up December 2009
MV Iron Prince (3rd)	Bulk carrier	1981	March 2000	Sold to Marmaras Navigation	Broken up May 2011
MV Iron Newcastle	Bulk carrier	1985	23 June 1999	Sold to Cobelfret Bulk Carriers N.V.	Broken up April 2011
MV Iron Kembla	Bulk carrier	1986	2 July 2005	Sold to Tip Top Invest Panama	Broken up March 2011
MV Iron Pacific	Bulk carrier	30 May 1986	15 March 1998	Sold to Partrederiet Bergesen Goic Da	Broken up July 2011
