= SS Iron Knight (1937) =

Merchant ship of Australia

Coordinates: 36°31′S 150°23′E

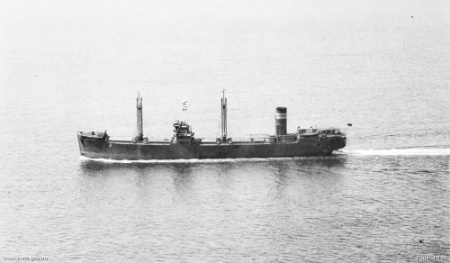
- Iron Knight in 1940

History

Australia
- Name: Iron Knight
- Owner: Broken Hill Pty
- Port of registry: Melbourne
- Builder: Lithgows, Port Glasgow
- Yard number: 902
- Launched: 27 August 1937
- Completed: October 1937
- Identification: UK official number 159568; call sign VLJZ
- Fate: Sunk by torpedo, 8 February 1943

General characteristics
- Type: bulk carrier
- Tonnage: 4,812 GRT, 2,737 NRT
- Length: 404.5 ft (123.3 m) registered
- Beam: 56.2 ft (17.1 m)
- Draught: 23 ft 9 in (7.24 m)
- Depth: 23.2 ft (7.1 m)
- Decks: 1
- Installed power: 553 NHP
- Propulsion: 1 × quadruple-expansion engine; 1 × exhaust steam turbine; 1 × screw
- Speed: 11 knots (20 km/h)
- Crew: 50
- Sensors & processing systems: echo sounding device
- Armament: DEMS
- Notes: sister ships: Iron Baron, Iron King, Iron Chieftain

SS Iron Knight was a bulk carrier that was built in Scotland in 1937 for the Australian Broken Hill Pty, Ltd (BHP) to carry iron ore. A Japanese submarine sank her by torpedo off the coast of New South Wales in 1943, killing 36 of her crew. A wreck that was identified as that of Iron Knight is protected by the Australian federal Underwater Cultural Heritage Act 2018.

== Building ==
In 1936 and 1937 Lithgows in Port Glasgow built four sister ships for BHP. Iron Baron and Iron King were launched in 1936. Iron Knight and Iron Chieftain were launched in 1937. Iron Knight was launched in 27 August and completed in October.

The four ships shared a similar layout, with a bridge and main superstructure amidships and engine room and funnel aft. All four ships had the same beam of 56.2 ft (17.1 m) and depth of 23.2 ft (7.1 m). Iron Knight and Iron Chieftain had a registered length of 404.5 ft (123.3 m), which was 11.3 ft (3.4 m) longer than Iron Baron and Iron King. Iron Knight's tonnages were 4,812 GRT and 2,737 NRT.

A Lithgows' subsidiary, David Rowan and Co of Glasgow, built the engines for all four sisters. Each ship had a single screw, driven by a quadruple-expansion steam engine, supplemented by an exhaust steam turbine driving a steam compressor. The exhaust turbine drove the same shaft as the piston engine. Between them, Iron Knight's piston engine and exhaust turbine were rated at 553 NHP and gave her a speed of 11 knots (20 km/h).

BHP registered Iron Knight in Melbourne. Her UK official number was 159568 and her call sign was VLJZ.

== Second World War ==
Iron Knight carried iron ore in Australian coastal waters. After Japan entered the Second World War in December 1941, Iron Knight sailed in CO and OC series coastal convoys for protection. Typically she took iron ore from Newcastle, NSW to ports in Victoria and South Australia.

Japanese submarines attacked shipping in Australian waters, and particularly off the coast of New South Wales. Ore carriers acquired a reputation as "death ships" because the density of their cargo caused them to sink too quickly for their crew to launch lifeboats. Life-rafts were fitted on sloping skids to be launched quickly. When Iron Chieftain was sunk on 3 June 1942, 37 of her 49 crew survived, 12 of them thanks to a life-raft.

=== Loss ===
Early in February 1943 Iron Knight left Whyalla, South Australia. On 5 February she joined Convoy OC 68, which left Melbourne bound for Newcastle. Including Iron Knight, OC 68 comprised ten merchant ships escorted by the corvettes HMAS Mildura and Townsville.

On 8 February OC 68 was about 11 nautical miles (20 km) off Montague Island, with Iron Knight at the head of the convoy. At 0230 hrs Japanese submarine I-21 fired a torpedo at Townsville. It passed under the corvette's bow and then hit Iron Knight. She sank by her bow within two minutes, killing 36 members of her crew. Another 14 crew members survived by clinging to wreckage and boarding one of Iron Knight's life-rafts.

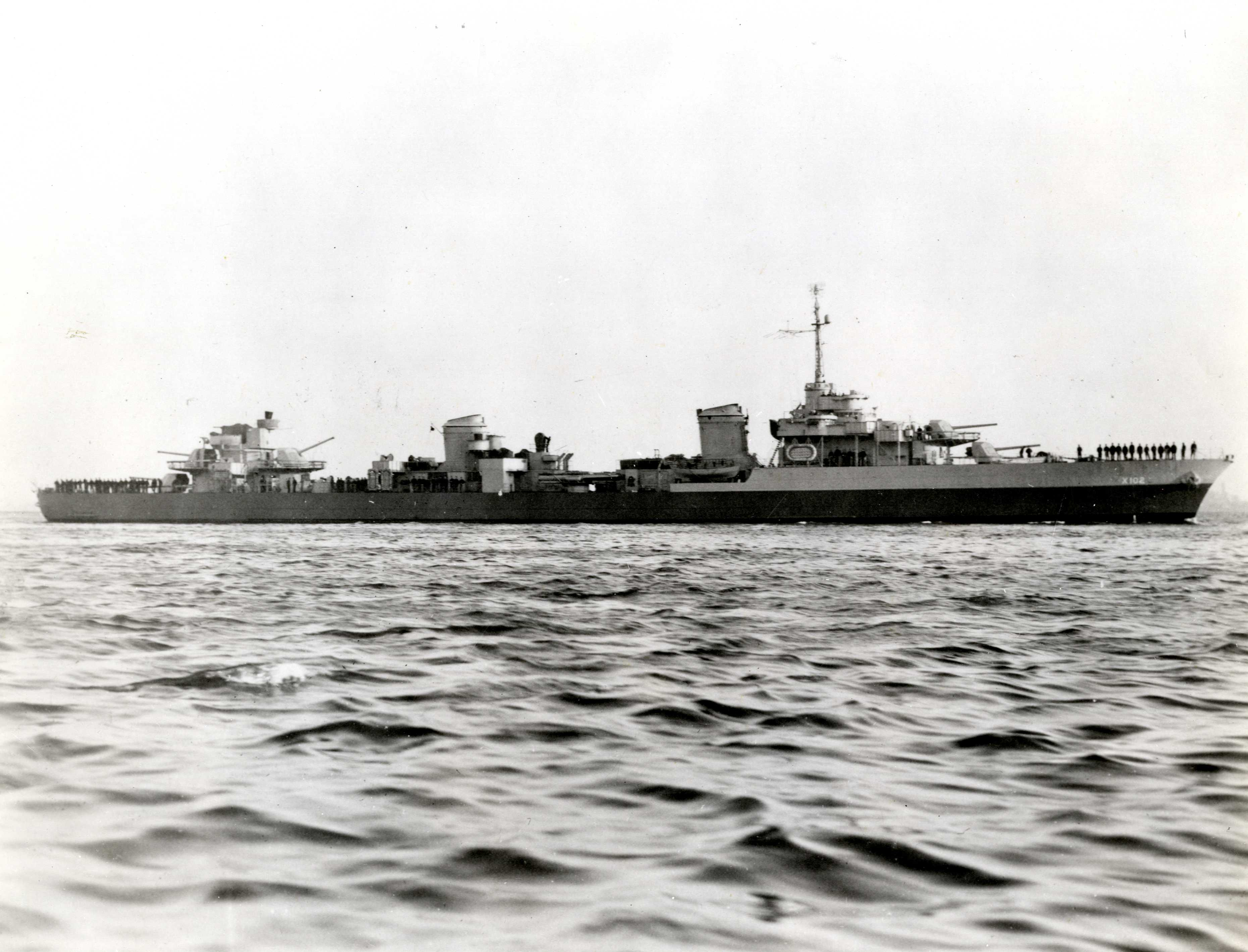
The Free French destroyer Le Triomphant, which rescued Iron Knight's 14 survivors

In accordance with naval practice at the time, OC 68 kept going and other ships the convoy did not stop to rescue survivors. Instead, 10 hours later the Free French destroyer Le Triomphant arrived and rescued them. To give the survivors clean dry clothes to change into, the destroyer crew issued French naval uniforms to them all.

In accordance with standard practice at the time, BHP stopped the survivors' pay from the moment Iron Knight was sunk. The company gave the survivors 30 days unpaid leave after the sinking, but deducted their time adrift in the raft from that 30 days.

== Heritage ==
In 2006 a wreck believed to be Iron Knight was found off the coast of Bermagui, NSW, at a depth of 125 m (410 ft). Federal Australian law protects the wreck. On 4 August 2006 the Australian Department of the Environment and Heritage declared it a protected wreck. A few years later, the identification of the wreck as Iron Knight was cast into doubt. However, whatever its identity, the wreck is now protected by the Underwater Cultural Heritage Act 2018.

The Newcastle Merchant Mariners Memorial, outside Newcastle railway station, includes the names of the 36 members of the crew who were killed.

== Bibliography ==
- Smith, Tim (2006). "The Final Journey of the Iron Knight" (PDF). Heritage NSW. Vol. 13, no. 2, Spring. Office of Environment and Heritage.
