= Gabo Island Lighthouse =

Lighthouse in Victoria, Australia

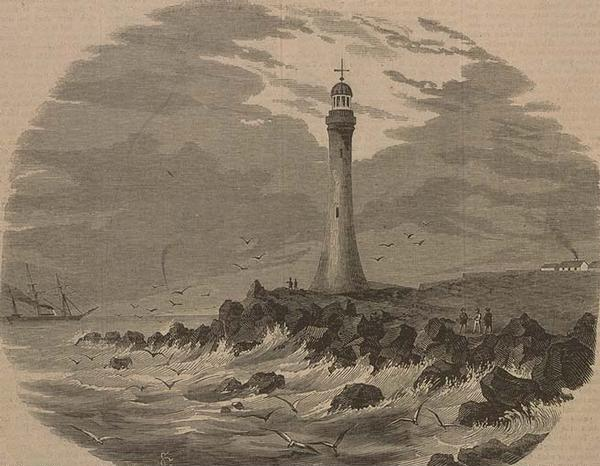
- Gabo Island lighthouse on an 1863 engraving
- Location: Gabo Island; Victoria; Australia
- Coordinates: 37°34′06.6″S 149°55′00.8″E

Tower
- Constructed: 1853 (first)
- Construction: granite tower
- Automated: 1993
- Height: 46.9 metres (154 ft)
- Shape: cylindrical tower with balcony and lantern
- Markings: unpainted red granite tower and white lantern and dome
- Power source: solar power
- Operator: Australian Maritime Safety Authority
- Heritage: listed on the Commonwealth Heritage List, listed on the Victorian Heritage Register

Light
- First lit: 1862 (current)
- Focal height: 55 metres (180 ft)
- Intensity: 30,000 cd
- Range: 16 nautical miles (30 km; 18 mi)
- Characteristic: Fl (3) W 20s.

The Gabo Island Lighthouse is an active lighthouse located on Gabo Island, Victoria, Australia.

== History ==
Works to erect a lighthouse on the island began in 1846 but funds were sufficient only to excavate the foundations. The first island lighthouse was a wooden tower built in 1853; the current tower was completed in 1862. It is made of pink granite quarried from the island itself. The lighthouse is Australia's second tallest. The light was fitted with an incandescent kerosene mantle in 1917 and upgraded in 1935, with mains power provided by a diesel generator and the 1,000 watt halogen lamp producing an intensity of 900,000 candela.

The focal plane of the light is situated at 55 metres (180 ft) above sea level and the characteristic is a group of three flashes every twenty seconds. A keeper's house is occupied by a caretaker; another building may be rented for overnight stays.

== See also ==
- List of lighthouses in Australia
