= USS P.H. Burnett =

Liberty ship of World War II

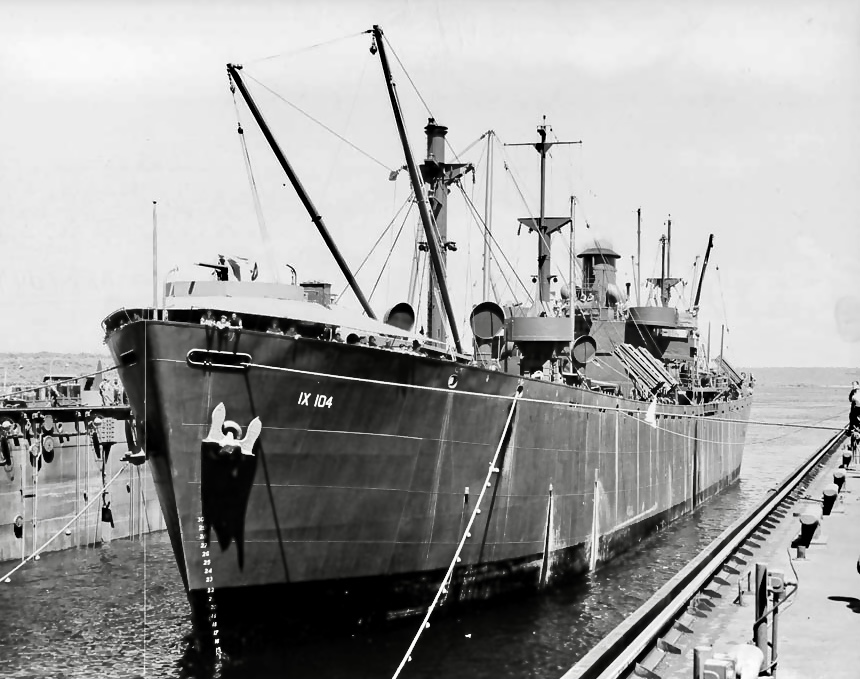
- USS P.H. Burnett

History

United States
- Name: Peter H. Burnett (1942-1943); P.H. Burnett (1943-1946)
- Namesake: Peter H. Burnett
- Owner: American President Lines (1942-1943); Maritime Commission (1943-1958); National Metal & Steel Corp. (1958)
- Builder: California Shipbuilding Corp.
- Laid down: 29 June 1942
- Launched: 10 August 1942
- Sponsored by: Mrs. Clyde Weed
- Commissioned: 29 August 1942
- Out of service: 17 November 1958
- Identification: Callsign: NJDR; Hull number: IX-104
- Honors and awards: See Awards
- Fate: Scrapped, 1958

General characteristics
- Class & type: Liberty ship; type EC2-S-C1, standard
- Tonnage: 10,865 LT DWT; 7,176 GRT
- Displacement: 3,380 long tons (3,434 t) (light); 14,245 long tons (14,474 t) (max)
- Length: 441 feet 6 inches (135 m) oa; 416 feet (127 m) pp; 427 feet (130 m) lwl
- Beam: 57 feet (17 m)
- Draft: 27 ft 9.25 in (8.4646 m)
- Installed power: 2 × Oil fired 450 °F (232 °C) boilers, operating at 220 psi (1,500 kPa); 2,500 hp (1,900 kW)
- Propulsion: 1 × triple-expansion steam engine, (manufactured by General Machinery Corp., Hamilton, Ohio); 1 × screw propeller
- Speed: 11.5 knots (21.3 km/h; 13.2 mph)
- Capacity: 562,608 cubic feet (15,931 m^{3}) (grain); 499,573 cubic feet (14,146 m^{3}) (bale)
- Complement: 12 officers, 170 enlisted
- Armament: 1 × single 5"/38 cal gun; 3 × single 3"/50 cal guns; 8 × single Oerlikon 20 mm cannons

SS Peter H. Burnett was an American Liberty ship built in 1942 for service in World War II. She was later acquired by the United States Navy and renamed USS P.H. Burnett (IX-104). Her namesake was Peter Hardeman Burnett, an American Governor from 1849 to 1851.

== Description ==
The ship was 442 ft 8 in (134.92 m) long overall (417 ft 9 in (127.33 m) between perpendiculars, 427 ft 0 in (130.15 m) waterline), with a beam of 57 ft 0 in (17.37 m). She had a depth of 34 ft 8 in (10.57 m) and a draught of 27 ft 9 in (8.46 m). She was assessed at 7,210 GRT, 4,880 NRT, 10,856 DWT.

She was powered by a triple expansion steam engine, which had cylinders of 24.5 inches (62 cm), 37 inches (94 cm) and 70 inches (180 cm) diameter by 70 inches (180 cm) stroke. The engine was built by the Worthington Pump & Machinery Corporation, Harrison, New Jersey. It drove a single screw propeller, which could propel the ship at 11 knots (20 km/h).

== Construction and career ==
This particular ship was built by California Shipbuilding Corporation in Los Angeles. She was laid down on 29 June 1942 and launched on 10 August 1942, later delivered on 29 August 1942. The United States War Shipping Administration gave the operations of the ship to American President Lines.

On 22 January 1943, Peter H. Burnett was on her voyage carrying 18,154 bales of wool from Newcastle to San Francisco. At 21:55, she was traveling at 11 knots when a torpedo, fired by Japanese submarine I-21, exploded on the ship's starboard side, at the no.5 hatch. 5 lifeboats were launched and stayed alongside the damaged ship for the night. But the no.3 lifeboat drifted 90 miles southeast to be rescued by USS Zane. HMAS Mildura then towed the damaged ship to Sydney for repairs. One armed guard on board the ship was seriously injured and later died from his injuries.

Peter H. Burnett carried cargo in the Pacific until 15 June 1943 when she was acquired by the Navy from the Maritime Commission under a bareboat charter. Renamed USS P. H. Burnett and designated as an unclassified vessel, IX-104, on 18 June, she was accepted by Commander Service Force, Seventh Fleet, at 8:00 a.m. on 2 July 1943 at Sydney, Australia, and placed in service as a freighter on 30 August 1943, Lt. D. Ruos, officer-in-charge.

As a dry cargo provisions ship, P. H. Burnett served at staging areas in the Pacific during the remainder of the war. With a cargo capacity in excess of 130,000 cubic feet, she hauled and discharged thousands of tons of supplies, joining Service Squadron 8 on 1 February 1944 and continuing her vital logistical operations as the westward advance of the Allies progressed.

Following the Japanese surrender in 1945, P. H. Burnett remained in the Pacific theater until ordered to return to the United States early in 1946. On 20 April 1945, she left Hollandia for Manila with Convoy GI 22.

Under tow, she proceeded from the Western Pacific, via Midway, to Seattle, Washington, where she arrived that summer. Placed out of service on 7 August 1946, P. H. Burnett was transferred to the Reserve Fleet Division of the War Shipping Administration the following day (8 August 1946) at Olympia, Washington, at 3:00 p.m.

Stricken from the Naval Register on 8 October 1946, P. H. Burnett remained in custody of the Maritime Administration (formerly Maritime Commission) until purchased by the National Metal & Steel Corp., on 20 October 1958. Removed from the Reserve Fleet at 1000 hours on 17 November 1958, she was broken up for scrap subsequently.

== Awards ==
- Asiatic-Pacific Campaign Medal
- World War II Victory Medal
