= SS Iron Knob =

Cargo ship

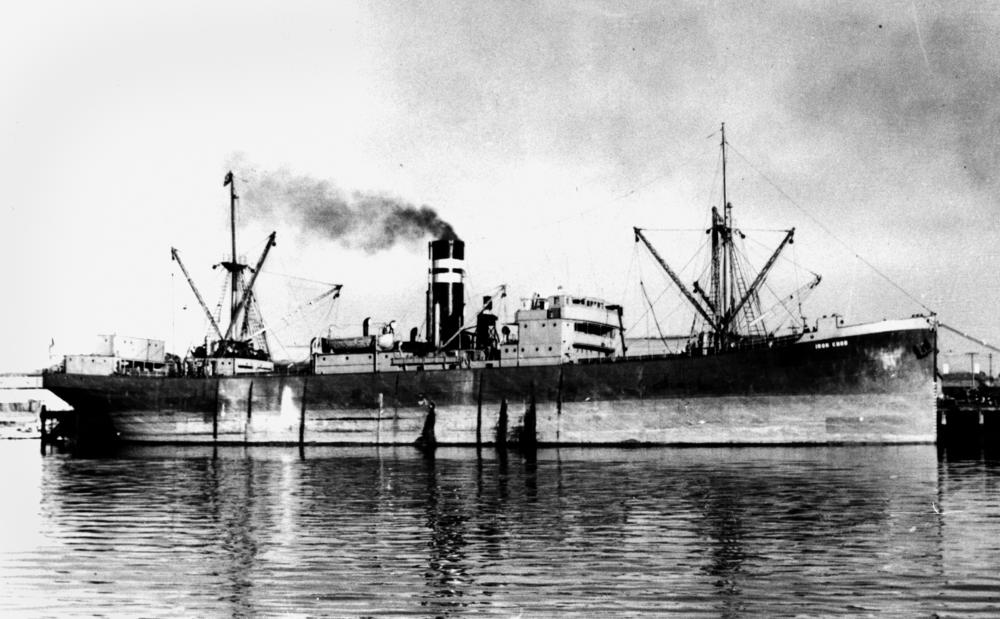
- Iron Knob c1920s

History

Australia
- Name: SS Iron Knob
- Namesake: Iron Knob, South Australia
- Owner: BHP Shipping
- Port of registry: (United Kingdom) Melbourne, Australia
- Builder: Poole & Steel, Adelaide, South Australia
- Launched: 17 December 1921
- Homeport: Melbourne
- Fate: Sunk

General characteristics
- Class & type: "E" class
- Type: General cargo
- Tonnage: 3,349 GRT
- Length: 331 ft 5 in (101.02 m)
- Beam: 47 ft 9 in (14.55 m)
- Depth: 2,326 ft 1 in (708.99 m)
- Propulsion: 1 x triple expansion steam engine (Poole & Steele) 516 hp (385 kW)
- Speed: 10 knots (19 km/h)

SS Iron Knob was a 3,349 GRT Australian cargo ship of BHP Shipping. It was built by Poole & Steel of Adelaide, South Australia in 1922 for the Commonwealth Line and initially named SS Euwarra. It was sold to BHP Shipping in October 1923 and renamed Iron Knob, becoming one of three "E" class steamships in BHP service.

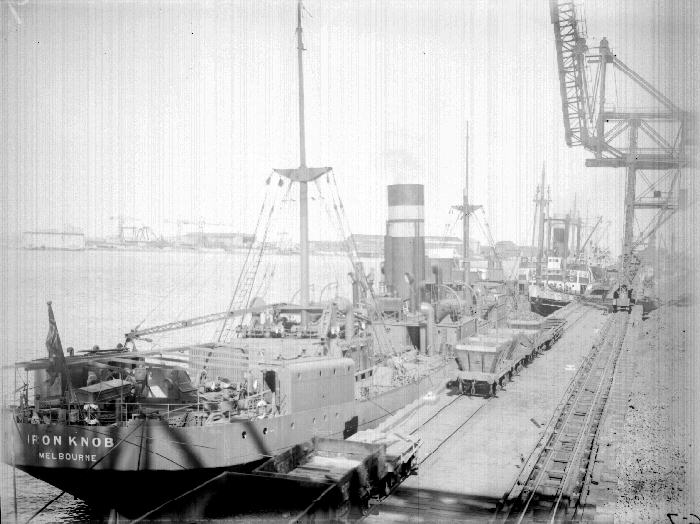
SS Iron Knob at Newcastle Steelworks c.1924

In its 32 years of service, it made 393 voyages between Newcastle and other Australian ports.

In 1955 it was sold to Panatiotis Vrangos of Italy, reregistered in Panama, and renamed SS Clarisse. The Clarisse sank in heavy seas in the Indian Ocean near 8°4′N 51°10′E on 15 July 1957.
