= Japanese submarine I-21 =

Imperial Japanese Navy Type B1 submarine

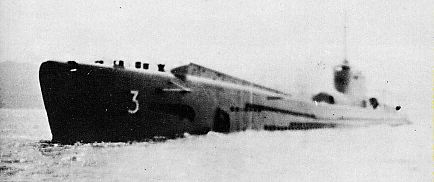
- I-21 anchored off Kobe a few days after commissioning, 20 July 1941

History

Japan
- Name: I-21
- Builder: Kawasaki shipyard, Kobe
- Laid down: 7 January 1939
- Launched: 24 February 1940
- Completed: 15 July 1941
- Fate: Missing after 27 November 1943.; Probably sunk 29 November 1943 by TBF Avengers from CVE USS Chenango off Tarawa.

General characteristics
- Class & type: Type B1 submarine
- Displacement: 2,584 long tons (2,625 t) surfaced; 3,654 long tons (3,713 t) submerged
- Length: 108.6 m (356 ft 4 in)
- Beam: 9.3 m (30 ft 6 in)
- Draft: 5.14 m (16 ft 10 in)
- Propulsion: 2 × Diesel engines, 12,400 hp (9,200 kW); Electric motors, 2,000 hp (1,500 kW)
- Speed: 23.5 knots (43.5 km/h; 27.0 mph) surfaced; 8 knots (15 km/h; 9.2 mph) submerged
- Range: 14,000 nmi (26,000 km) at 16 kn (30 km/h; 18 mph)
- Test depth: 100 m (330 ft)
- Complement: 94
- Armament: 6 × 533 mm (21 in) torpedo tubes; 17 × torpedoes; 1 × 14 cm/40 11th Year Type naval gun
- Aircraft carried: 1 × Yokosuka E14Y floatplane

I-21 (伊号第二一潜水艦, I-gō Dai Nijū-ichi sensui-kan) was a Japanese Type B1 submarine which saw service during World War II in the Imperial Japanese Navy. She displaced 1,950 tons and had a speed of 24 knots (44 km/h). I-21 was the most successful Japanese submarine to operate in Australian waters, participating in the attack on Sydney Harbour in 1942 and sinking 44,000 tons of Allied shipping during her two deployments off the east coast of Australia.

== Service history ==
The submarine was laid down on 7 January 1939 at the Kawasaki shipyard, Kobe, and launched on 24 February 1940. On 15 July 1941 she was completed, commissioned and assigned to Submarine Squadron 1's Submarine Division 3 in the Sixth Fleet. I-21 was based in the Yokosuka Naval District.

On 31 October 1941 Commander Matsumura Kanji was assigned as Commanding Officer, and on 10 November he attended a meeting of submarine commanders aboard the light cruiser Katori, convened by Vice Admiral Mitsumi Shimizu, to be briefed on the planned attack on Pearl Harbor.

=== Attack on Pearl Harbor ===
I-21 departed Yokosuka on 19 November and sailed to the rendezvous at Hitokappu Bay, Etorofu, arriving on the 22nd, and departing on the 26th for the Hawaiian Islands, acting as a lookout ahead of the Carrier Striking Force. On 2 December 1941 the coded signal "Climb Mount Niitaka" was received, signifying that hostilities would commence on 8 December (Japan time). On 7 December 1941 I-21 was assigned to patrol north of Oahu, Hawaii.

On 9 December I-6 reported sighting a Lexington-class aircraft carrier and two cruisers. I-21 and the rest of SubRon 1 boats, were ordered to pursue and sink her. However I-21's pursuit was delayed by diesel engine breakdowns and electrical problems. Finally, on 14 December, the chase was abandoned and I-21 and the other submarines were ordered to the West Coast of the United States.

=== Sinking of SS Montebello ===
On 23 December 1941, I-21 sighted the Union Oil Company's 8,272 GRT oil tanker Montebello. The 440 ft (130 m) vessel, built in 1921, was en route from Port San Luis, California, to Vancouver, British Columbia.

At 05:30, I-21 fired two torpedoes at a range of 2,190 yd (2,000 m). One was a dud, but the other struck forward in the pump room and dry storage cargo hold. The 38-man crew abandoned the tanker in four lifeboats, which were machine-gunned by I-21 with no casualties. Montebello sank in 900 ft (270 m) of water about 4 mi (6.4 km) south of Piedras Blancas Light at 35°35′N 121°16′W.

In November 1996, a team of marine researchers surveyed and filmed the wreck in a two-person submarine. Montebello was on the sea floor in 900 ft (270 m) of water adjacent to the Monterey Bay National Marine Sanctuary. The wreck was reexamined in 2010 for the level of deterioration and to determine if the oil was still in the hold and if so, did it pose an environmental threat. The researchers reported in October 2011 that the cargo had dissipated into the vast ocean shortly after sinking.

=== Shelling of Newcastle, Australia ===
On 8 June 1942, I-21 briefly shelled Newcastle, New South Wales. Among the areas hit within the city were dockyards and steel works. There were no casualties in the attack and damage was minimal.

=== Possible sinking of USS Porter ===
On 26 October 1942, in the Battle of the Santa Cruz Islands, I-21 is credited in most sources with sinking of the destroyer USS Porter. However, author Richard B. Frank states that Japanese records do not support this, and that, more likely, an errant torpedo from a ditching U.S. Grumman TBF Avenger hit Porter and caused the fatal damage.

=== Sinking of SS Kalingo ===
On 17 January 1943, I-21 torpedoed and sank the Union Steam Ship Company's SS Kalingo about 110 mi (180 km) east of Sydney. Two firemen were killed when the torpedo hit, and 32 of her crew reached safety in a boat.

=== Sinking of SS Iron Knight ===
The BHP Shipping iron ore carrier SS Iron Knight was part of a convoy of ten ships travelling up the east coast of New South Wales on 8 February 1943. At approximately 2:30 am, north of Twofold Bay, I-21 fired a torpedo at the naval ships flanking Iron Knight at the head of the flotilla under cover of darkness. The torpedo passed under the bow of the Bathurst-class corvette HMAS Townsville and struck Iron Knight, sinking her with the loss of 36 crewmen, including her commander, in less than two minutes. Most of the ship's crew were below decks and were unable to escape as the ship went down. Only 14 survived, clambering aboard a single lifeboat to be picked up by the Le Triomphant. HMAS Mildura, the other corvette guarding the convoy, pursued the I-21 for several days.

On 4 June 2006, the wreck of Iron Knight was discovered in waters off the New South Wales town of Bermagui at a depth of approximately 125 metres (410 ft). Local fishermen had snagged their nets on the wreck over the years. Families and descendants of the crew traveled to the site and laid a wreath and poppies on the waters above the wreck. The sole remaining survivor of the sinking, John Stone, was unable to make the journey from his home in southern Victoria.

=== Sinking of Starr King ===
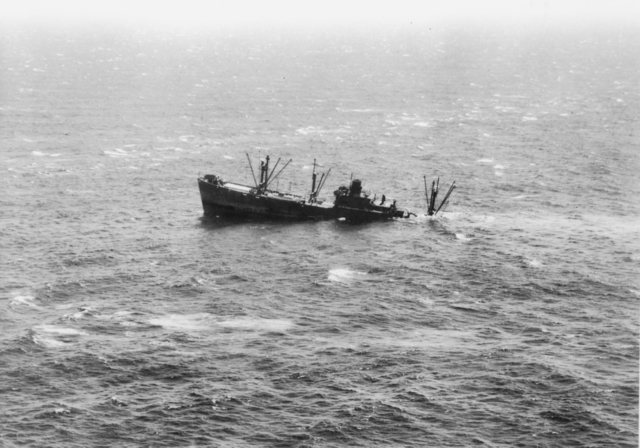
Starr King sinking after being attacked by I-21 near Port Macquarie on 10 February 1943.

On 11 February 1943, I-21 sank the 7,176 GRT U.S. Liberty Ship Starr King near Port Macquarie. There were no casualties, and the crew was picked up by HMAS Warramunga.

=== Other ships damaged or sunk along the Australian east coast ===
On 18 January 1943, I-21 torpedoed the tanker Mobilube, 60 miles (97 km) off the coast of Sydney, with the loss of three lives. On 22 January 1943 I-21 also torpedoed the Liberty ship Peter H. Burnett, approximately 420 miles (680 km) north of Sydney, it was towed back to Sydney by the corvette HMAS Mildura. On 12 November 1943 the troopship Cape San Juan was torpedoed near the Fiji Islands while sailing from San Francisco to Townsville and sank the next day. Injured and others were taken off by Edwin T. Meredith. Survivors in the water were picked up by USS McCalla, USS Dempsey and YMS 241.

=== Loss ===
I-21 was never sighted again following a final report made on 27 November 1943, off the Gilbert Islands. A Japanese Type B submarine, which was probably I-21, was torpedoed and sunk by TBF Avengers off Tarawa on 29 November 1943.

== Summery of raiding history ==
Date	Ship name	Classification	Tonnage	Nationality	Fate
23 December 1941	Montebello	Tanker	8,272	USA	Sunk
5 May 1942	John Adams	Cargo ship	7,176	USA	Sunk
7 May 1942	Chloe	Merchant ship	4,641	Greece	Sunk
12 June 1942	Guatemala	Freighter	5,527	Australia	Sunk
9 November 1942	Edgar Allen Poe	Cargo ship	7,176	USA	Destroyed
18 January 1943	Kalingo	Freighter	2,051	Australia	Sunk
18 January 1943	Mobilube	Tanker	10,220	USA	Destroyed
22 January 1943	Peter H Burnett	Cargo ship	7,176	USA	Destroyed
8 February 1943	Iron Knight	Freighter	4,812	Britain	Sunk
10 February 1943	Starr King	Cargo ship	7,176	USA	Sunk
11 November 1943	Cape San Juan	Freighter	6,711	USA	Sunk

== Bibliography ==
- Milanovich, Kathrin (2021). "The IJN Submarines of the I 15 Class". In Jordan, John (ed.). Warship 2021. Oxford, UK: Osprey Publishing. pp. 29–43. ISBN 978-1-4728-4779-9.
