= HMAS Bingera =

Anti-submarine ship built in 1935

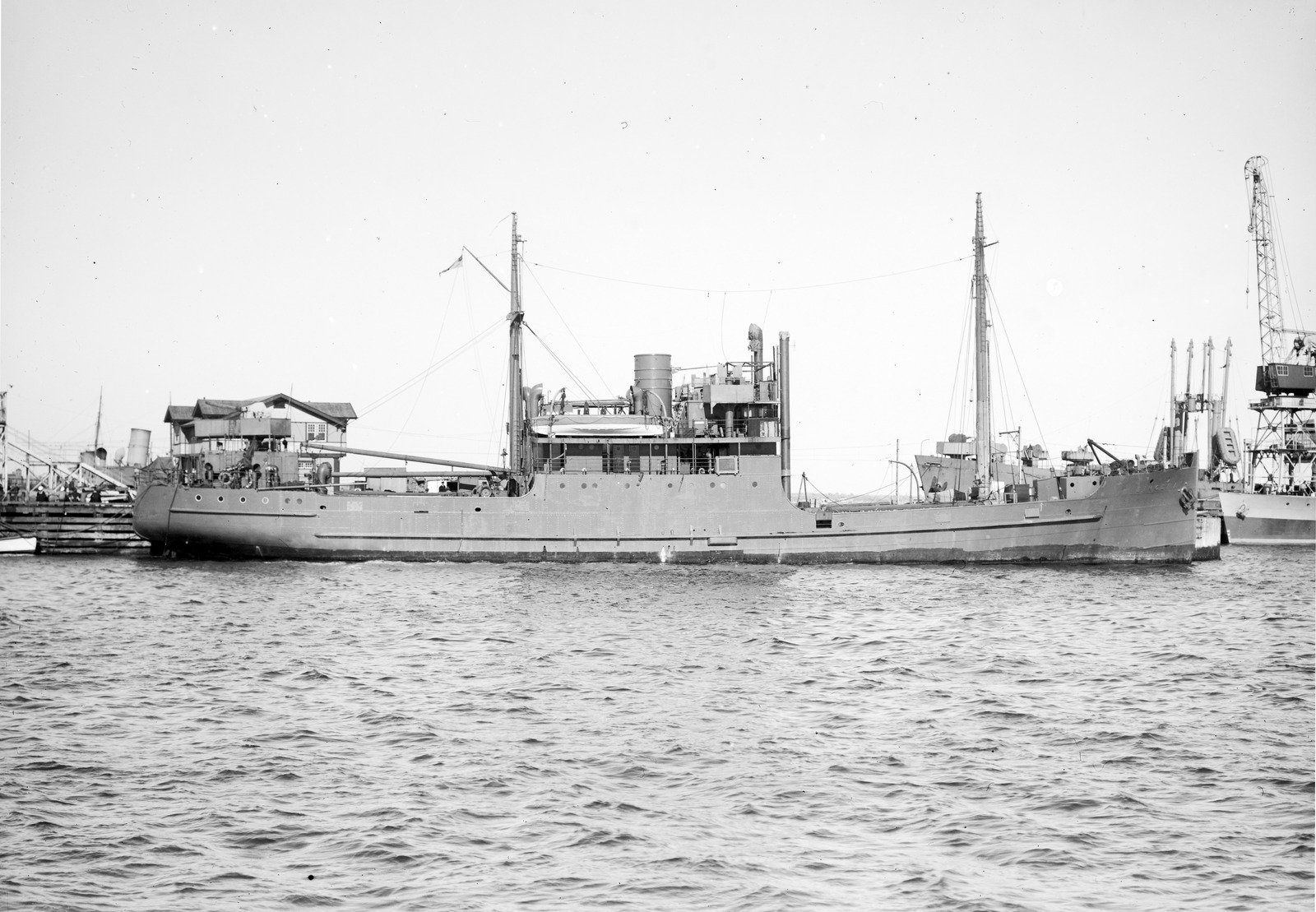

History
- Name: MV Bingera
- Owner: Australasian Steam Navigation Company (1935-1948)
- Port of registry: (United Kingdom) Bundaberg, Australia (1935-1948)
- Builder: William Denny and Brothers, Dumbarton, Scotland
- Yard number: 1279
- Launched: 1935
- Identification: UK Official Number: 109652; Code Letters: VLDZ

History

Australia
- Name: HMAS Bingera
- Commissioned: 5 February 1940
- Decommissioned: August 1946
- Fate: Returned to owners

General characteristics
- Tonnage: 922 gross tonnage
- Length: 115.4 ft (35 m)
- Beam: 22.1 ft (7 m)
- Depth: 12.1 ft (4 m)
- Propulsion: 1 x oil engine (J G Kincaid & Co Ltd, Greenock) 900 bhp (670 kW)

HMAS Bingera was an auxiliary anti-submarine vessel of the Royal Australian Navy (RAN) during the Second World War. Bingera was built by William Denny and Brothers, Dumbarton in 1935 for the Australasian United Steam Navigation Company for the Queensland coastal trade, arriving at Brisbane on 18 November 1935.

Commissioned into the RAN on 5 February 1940 and was employed in patrolling the East Coast of Australia. She was present during the Japanese midget submarine raid on Sydney Harbour on 30 May-1 June 1942 and rescued 12 men on a raft from the steamer Iron Chieftain on 4 June, sunk by Japanese submarine I-24, 27 miles east of Sydney on 3 June. She was decommissioned in August 1946 and returned to her owners.

Bingera was sold in February 1948 to Imperial Chemical Industries of Australia and New Zealand and renamed Taranui. Her holds were lined with timber and she was used to carry cargoes for ICI's Nobel Explosive Co. She was sold in 1960 to South Pacific Shipping Co and in 1963 to South Seas Shipping, both of Suva. On 28 January 1963 she took logs and 485 tons of corrugated iron from Port Kembla to Raglan. She also made several trips with molasses from Bundaberg. In 1966 she was carrying sand from Westport to Newcastle. From about 1963 to 1970, Taranui was chartered by the New Zealand Oceanographic Institute for several voyages, which included one through Cyclone Giselle.

In 1971 she was sold to Cia de Naviera Louise SA, Panama and renamed Locolina. Sold in 1978 to Straits Chartering and renamed Kah Wah, before being renamed Pattana in 1978. She was deleted from Lloyd's registry in 1988, probably after being scrapped in Thailand.
