= Iron Baron (ship) =

Cargo ship

Coordinates: 39.22°S 149.13°E

History
- Name: MV Iron Baron
- Owner: Wallaby Shipping
- Operator: BHP Shipping
- Port of registry: , Australia
- Builder: Sumitomo Heavy Industries, Kurashiki, Japan
- Yard number: 2352
- Launched: December 1984
- Identification: IMO number: 853686
- Fate: Scuttled off Flinders Island, 30 July 1995

General characteristics
- Type: Bulk carrier
- Tonnage: 37,557 DWT
- Length: 188.02 m (616.9 ft)
- Beam: 28 m (92 ft)
- Draught: 15.4 m (51 ft)
- Crew: 18<

The Iron Baron was a 37,557 dwt bulk carrier built in 1985. It was chartered by BHP Shipping in 1990, running aground nar the mouth of the Tamar River in 1995 and later being scuttled off Flinders Island.

== History ==
Built by Sumitomo Heavy Industries, Kurashiki, Japan, the ship was launched in December 1984 as the Ocean Express. It was sold in 1985 to Hibaya Enterprises and in 1987 to Showa Aircraft Industry. In 1989 it was to Great Shipping, Panama and renamed Irrawaddy. Later the same year it was sold to Burma Navigation Corporation. It was sold 1990 to IS Shipping, Liberia, going on bareboat charter by BHP Shipping later that year for five years, being renamed Iron Baron.

On 10 July 1995 it was nearing the end of a voyage transporting 24,000 tonnes of manganese ore from Groote Eylandt via Port Kembla to the port of Bell Bay, Tasmania, Australia. Weather conditions at the time were north-westerly 37–46 km/h (20–25 knot) winds and two-metre seas. It grounded on Hebe Reef as it approached the mouth of the Tamar River and began leaking bunker fuel oil. The crew was safely evacuated.

Salvage work commenced and the first casualties of the incident, a dead penguin and three dead cormorants, were recovered by 13 July. At that time 200 penguins had been taken into care.

On 16 July the Iron Baron was refloated and moved to an offshore anchorage. Underwater inspections confirmed that it had incurred major structural damage and was continuing to deteriorate. With further bad weather predicted, it was decided by BHP to sink the ship. It was towed to an approved disposal site 85 kilometres (53 mi) east of Flinders Island where it sank on 30 July.

== Environmental impact ==
An estimated 325 tonnes of heavy bunker fuel oil was spilled from the vessel in the course of its grounding, refloating and towing to the disposal ground.

Several beaches and islands in north-eastern Tasmania were affected and a major clean-up and wildlife rescue effort was undertaken. Little penguins were especially badly affected with 1894 oiled birds collected for treatment and rehabilitation. An estimated 2,000–6,000 were killed at Ninth Island alone. In 2001, penguin fatalities were estimated at between 10,000 and 20,000 birds. In 2005, a 10-year post-mortem reflection on the incident revised the figure upwards, estimating penguin fatalities at 25,000.
