= SS Iron Crown =

Australian steamship sunk in 1942

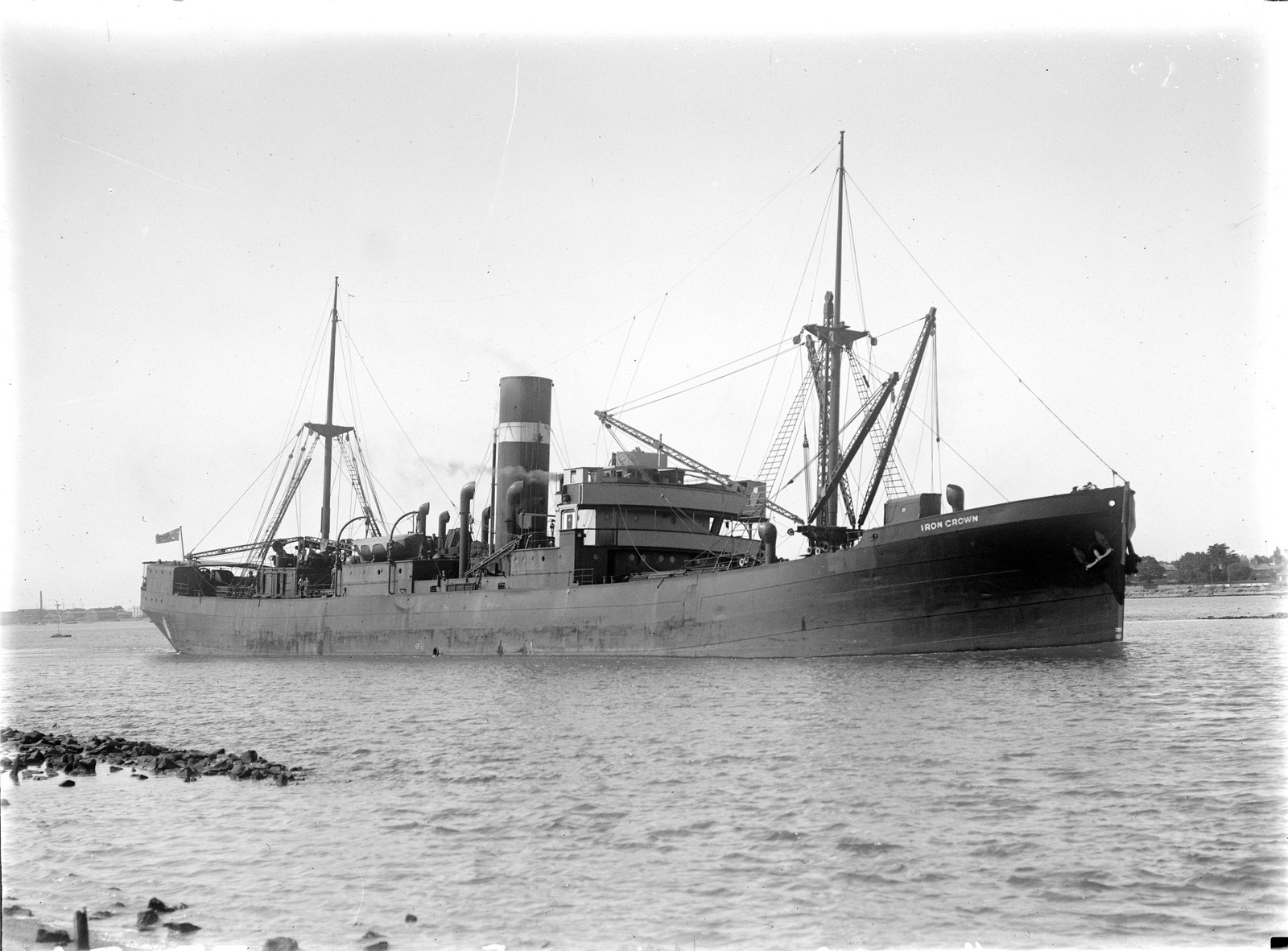

History

Australia
- Name: 1922: Euroa; 1923: Iron Crown
- Namesake: 1922: Euroa
- Owner: 1922: Commonwealth Line; 1923: Interstate Steamships Pty Ltd
- Operator: 1923: Broken Hill Pty
- Port of registry: 1922: Melbourne; 1923: Sydney
- Builder: Williamstown Dockyard
- Launched: 27 January 1922
- Completed: 1922
- Identification: UK official number 151806; until 1933: code letters THSB; by 1930: call sign VJDK
- Fate: sunk, 4 June 1942

General characteristics
- Type: cargo ship
- Tonnage: 3,353 GRT, 1,922 NRT
- Length: 331.0 ft (100.9 m)
- Beam: 47.9 ft (14.6 m)
- Draught: 23 ft 10 in (7.26 m)
- Depth: 23.6 ft (7.2 m)
- Decks: 1
- Installed power: 387 NHP
- Propulsion: 1 × triple-expansion engine; 1 × screw
- Crew: 43

SS Iron Crown was an Australian cargo steamship that was built in 1922 for the Commonwealth Line as Euroa, named after the town of Euroa in the state of Victoria. Broken Hill Proprietary (BHP) acquired her in 1923, renamed her Iron Crown, and used her as an iron ore carrier. A Japanese submarine sank her in World War II.

== History ==
Williamstown Dockyard built the ship for the Australian Commonwealth Shipping Board's Commonwealth Line. She was launched on 27 January 1922 as Euroa, and registered in Melbourne. In December 1923 BHP acquired her, renamed her Iron Crown, and registered her in Sydney.

On 4 June 1942 Iron Crown, was en route from Whyalla in South Australia to Newcastle, New South Wales when Japanese submarine I-27 sank her by torpedo 71 km (44 mi) south-southwest of Gabo Island. 38 of her 43 crew members were killed. Mulbera rescued survivors.

George Fisher, the last survivor, was aged 18 when the ship sank, and died in 2012.

== Wreckage discovery ==
In April 2019 it was announced that the wreck of Iron Crown had been located by marine archaeologists aboard CSIRO research vessel RV Investigator at a depth of 700 metres (2,300 ft), about 100 kilometres (54 nmi) off the coast of Victoria.

== Official number and code letters ==
Official numbers were a forerunner to IMO Numbers. Iron Crown's UK official number was 151806. Her code letters were THSB until 1933. By 1930 her wireless telegraph call sign was VJDK.

== Bibliography ==
- Lloyd's Register of Shipping. Vol. II.–Steamers and Motor Vessels. London: Lloyd's Register of Shipping. 1922 – via Internet Archive.
- Lloyd's Register of Shipping. Vol. II.–Steamers and Motor Vessels. London: Lloyd's Register of Shipping. 1923 – via Internet Archive.
- Lloyd's Register of Shipping. Vol. II.–Steamers and Motorships. London: Lloyd's Register of Shipping. 1924 – via Internet Archive.
- Lloyd's Register of Shipping. Vol. II.–Steamers and Motorships of 300 tons gross and over. London: Lloyd's Register of Shipping. 1934 – via Southampton City Council.
- Mercantile Navy List. London. 1930 – via Crew List Index Project.
