= Japanese submarine I-27 =

World War II Japanese Navy submarine

- The crew of I-27 posing by her conning tower, February 1942

History

Empire of Japan
- Name: I-27
- Builder: Sasebo Naval Arsenal
- Laid down: 5 July 1939
- Launched: 6 June 1940
- Commissioned: 24 February 1942
- Fate: Sunk February 12, 1944

General characteristics
- Class & type: Type B1 submarine
- Displacement: 2,631 tonnes (2,589 long tons) surfaced; 3,713 tonnes (3,654 long tons) submerged
- Length: 108.7 m (356 ft 8 in) overall
- Beam: 9.3 m (30 ft 6 in)
- Draft: 5.1 m (16 ft 9 in)
- Installed power: 12,400 bhp (9,200 kW) (diesel); 2,000 hp (1,500 kW) (electric motor)
- Propulsion: Diesel-electric; 1 × diesel engine; 1 × electric motor
- Speed: 23.5 knots (43.5 km/h; 27.0 mph) surfaced; 8 knots (15 km/h; 9.2 mph) submerged
- Range: 14,000 nmi (26,000 km; 16,000 mi) at 16 knots (30 km/h; 18 mph) surfaced; 96 nmi (178 km; 110 mi) at 3 knots (5.6 km/h; 3.5 mph) submerged
- Test depth: 100 m (330 ft)
- Crew: 100
- Armament: 6 × bow 533 mm (21 in) torpedo tubes; 1 × 14 cm (5.5 in) deck gun; 2 × single 25 mm (1 in) Type 96 anti-aircraft guns
- Aircraft carried: 1 × floatplane
- Aviation facilities: 1 × catapult

I-27 was a submarine of the Imperial Japanese Navy which saw service during the Pacific Campaign of World War II. I-27 was commissioned at Sasebo, Japan on February 24, 1942 and sunk on February 12, 1944, after torpedoing the troopship SS Khedive Ismail.

== Design and construction ==
I-27 was one of the 29 Type B submarines constructed for the Imperial Japanese navy, and was specifically one of 20 Type B1 submarines; the first subclass of three. As cruiser submarines, the Type B1 class was larger than comparative American, British, and German submarines to serve as fleet units. Each ship displaced around 2,600 tons surfaced and 3,700 tons submerged, with a length of 108.7 m (356 ft 8 in), a width of 9.3 m (30 ft 6 in), and a draft of 5.1 m (16 ft 9 in).

Two diesel engines each producing 6,200 bhp (4,623 kW) produced a top speed of 23.6 knots on the surface and a maximum range of 14,000 nmi (26,000 km; 16,000 mi) at 16 knots, while two electric motors each producing 1,000 hp (746 kW) drove the ship to a top speed of 8 knots while submerged and a maximum range 96 nmi (178 km; 110 mi) at 3 knots. I-27 was armed with six forward 533 mm (21 in) torpedo tubes (with 17 type 95 torpedoes in total), one 140 mm (5.5 in) deck gun, and initially one twin 25 mm AA gun mounted on her conning tower.

I-27 - along with her sistership I-28 - differed from the rest of the Type B1 submarines in the fact that she was designed to operate a midget submarine like the succeeding Type C submarines. Because of this, it's very likely the ship was constructed without a forward hanger tube for floatplane operations and instead had her 140 mm (5.5 in) deck gun placed forward of the bridge to make way for a midget submarine to be mounted on her stern. Photographs of I-27 on 12 February 1944 show the submarine in this configuration, and limited photographic evidence of the ship in February 1942 help to substantiate that I-27 was always built in that manner.

I-27 was laid down in the Sasebo Naval Arsenal on 5 July 1939, launched on 6 June 1940, and commissioned on 24 February 1942 shortly after the beginning of the Pacific War.

== Service history ==
On 31 May 1942, I-27 launched midget submarine M-14 as the leading submarine for the attack on Sydney Harbour in Australia.

On 4 June 1942, Iron Crown while en route Whyalla-Newcastle was torpedoed and sunk 44 miles SSW of Gabo Island by I-27. Thirty eight of her forty two crew were lost, with the survivors being picked up by SS Mulbera.

On 20 March 1943, Fort Mumford was torpedoed and sunk in the Indian Ocean (10°00′N 71°00′E) by I-27. The sole survivor of this sinking made no comment as to the fate of the crew, although some publications suggest that they may have been killed by the crew of I-27. There is no conclusive evidence either way, but there is also no evidence of I-27 taking such action on other occasions.

On 5 June 1943, I-27 torpedoed and sank SS Montanan in the Indian Ocean. Five of Montanan's crew were killed and 58 were rescued.

On 5 July 1943 I-27 torpedoed and damaged the Alcoa Prospector, sailing as part of convoy PA44 in the Gulf of Oman. The turbine engines of this ship were later salvaged and used to propel the Great Lakes freighter Kinsman Independent.

On November 8, 1943, I-27 sank the Liberty ship SS Sambridge. The survivors made it safely to lifeboats and the second officer Henry Scurr was taken prisoner. A burst of machine-gun fire was heard by the survivors, but its reason is unknown as Scurr was eventually freed from Changi prison camp at the end of the war.

I-27 under attack from the destroyers HMS Paladin and HMS Petard after she sank the troop transport SS Khedive Ismail on 12 February 1944, taken from Pertard

The submarine torpedoed and sank the Allied steamship SS Khedive Ismail near the Maldives on 12 February 1944, killing 1,297 passengers and crew. After the attack, I-27 attempted to hide under Khedive Ismail's survivors who were floating in the water. Nevertheless, the British destroyers HMS Paladin and HMS Petard located the submarine and destroyed it with depth charges, ramming, and torpedoes at 01°25′N 72°22′E. All of I-27's crew were killed.

== Summery of raiding history ==
Date	Ship name	Classification	Tonnage	Nationality	Fate
4 June 1942	Barwon	Freighter	4,239	Australia	Damaged
4 June 1942	Iron Crown	Cargo ship	3,353	Australia	Sunk
22 October 1942	Ocean Vintage	Armed steamship	7,174	British	Sunk
20 March 1943	Fort Mumford	Armed merchant ship	7,132	British	Sunk
7 May 1943	Berakit	Motor vessel	6,608	Dutch	Sunk
3 June 1943	Montanan	Armed freighter	4,897	USA	Sunk
24 June 1943	British Venture	Armed tanker	4,696	British	Sunk
28 June 1943	Dah Puh	Armed steamship	1,974	Norwegian	Sunk
5 July 1943	Alcoa Prospecter	Freighter	6,797	USA	Damaged
9 September 1943	Larchbank	Armed motor vessel	5,151	British	Sunk
10 November 1943	Sambo	Cargo ship	7,176	British	Sunk
18 November 1943	Sambridge	Cargo ship	7,176	British	Sunk
3 December 1943	Fort Camosun	Freighter	7,126	British	Damaged
12 February 1944	Khedive Ismail	Armed steamship	7,513	British	Sunk

== Bibliography ==
- Crabb, Brian James (2015). Passage to Destiny: The Sinking of the SS Khedive Ismail in the sea war against Japan. Shaun Tyas. ISBN 978-1-907730-41-2.
- Hashimoto, Mochitsura (1954). Sunk: The Story of the Japanese Submarine Fleet 1942 – 1945. Colegrave, E.H.M. (translator). London: Cassell and Company. ASIN B000QSM3L0.
- Hackett, Bob; Sander Kingsepp (2003). "HIJMS Submarine I-27: Tabular Record of Movement". Sensuikan!. Combinedfleet.com.
- Hackett, Bob; Sander Kingsepp (2003). "Type B1". Sensuikan!. Combinedfleet.com.
- Milanovich, Kathrin (2021). "The IJN Submarines of the I 15 Class". In Jordan, John (ed.). Warship 2021. Oxford, UK: Osprey Publishing. pp. 29–43. ISBN 978-1-4728-4779-9.
