= HMAS Townsville (J205) =

Bathurst-class corvette of Royal Australian Navy

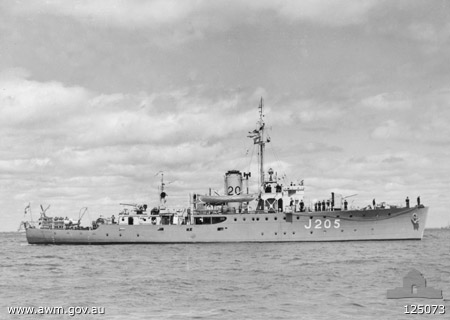
- HMAS Townsville in 1946

History

Australia
- Namesake: City of Townsville, Queensland
- Builder: Evans Deakin & Co in Brisbane, Queensland
- Laid down: 16 November 1940
- Launched: 13 May 1941
- Commissioned: 19 December 1941
- Decommissioned: 5 August 1946
- Honours and awards: Battle honours: Darwin 1942; Pacific 1942–45; New Guinea 1944
- Fate: Sold for scrap in 1956
- Badge

General characteristics
- Class & type: Bathurst-class corvette
- Displacement: 650 tons (standard), 1,025 tons (full war load)
- Length: 186 ft (57 m)
- Beam: 31 ft (9.4 m)
- Draught: 8.5 ft (2.6 m)
- Propulsion: triple expansion engine, 2 shafts
- Speed: 15 knots (28 km/h; 17 mph) at 1,750 hp
- Complement: 85
- Armament: 1 × 4 inch Mk XIX gun; 3 × Oerlikon 20 mm cannons; Machine guns; Depth charges chutes and throwers

HMAS Townsville (J205/M205/A124), named after the city of Townsville, Queensland, was one of 60 Bathurst-class corvettes constructed during World War II, and one of 36 initially manned and commissioned solely by the Royal Australian Navy (RAN).

== Design and construction ==
In 1938, the Australian Commonwealth Naval Board (ACNB) identified the need for a general purpose 'local defence vessel' capable of both anti-submarine and mine-warfare duties, while easy to construct and operate. The vessel was initially envisaged as having a displacement of approximately 500 tons, a speed of at least 10 knots (19 km/h; 12 mph), and a range of 2,000 nautical miles (3,700 km; 2,300 mi) The opportunity to build a prototype in the place of a cancelled Bar-class boom defence vessel saw the proposed design increased to a 680-ton vessel, with a 15.5 knots (28.7 km/h; 17.8 mph) top speed, and a range of 2,850 nautical miles (5,280 km; 3,280 mi), armed with a 4-inch gun, equipped with asdic, and able to fitted with either depth charges or minesweeping equipment depending on the planned operations: although closer in size to a sloop than a local defence vessel, the resulting increased capabilities were accepted due to advantages over British-designed mine warfare and anti-submarine vessels. Construction of the prototype HMAS Kangaroo did not go ahead, but the plans were retained. The need for locally built 'all-rounder' vessels at the start of World War II saw the "Australian Minesweepers" (designated as such to hide their anti-submarine capability, but popularly referred to as "corvettes") approved in September 1939, with 60 constructed during the course of the war: 36 (including Townsville) ordered by the RAN, 20 ordered by the British Admiralty but manned and commissioned as RAN vessels, and 4 for the Royal Indian Navy.

Townsville was laid down by Evans Deakin & Co at Brisbane, Queensland on 16 November 1940. She was launched on 13 May 1941 by Mrs. P. E. McNeil, wife of the Third Member of the Naval Board, and commissioned into th RAN on 19 December 1941.

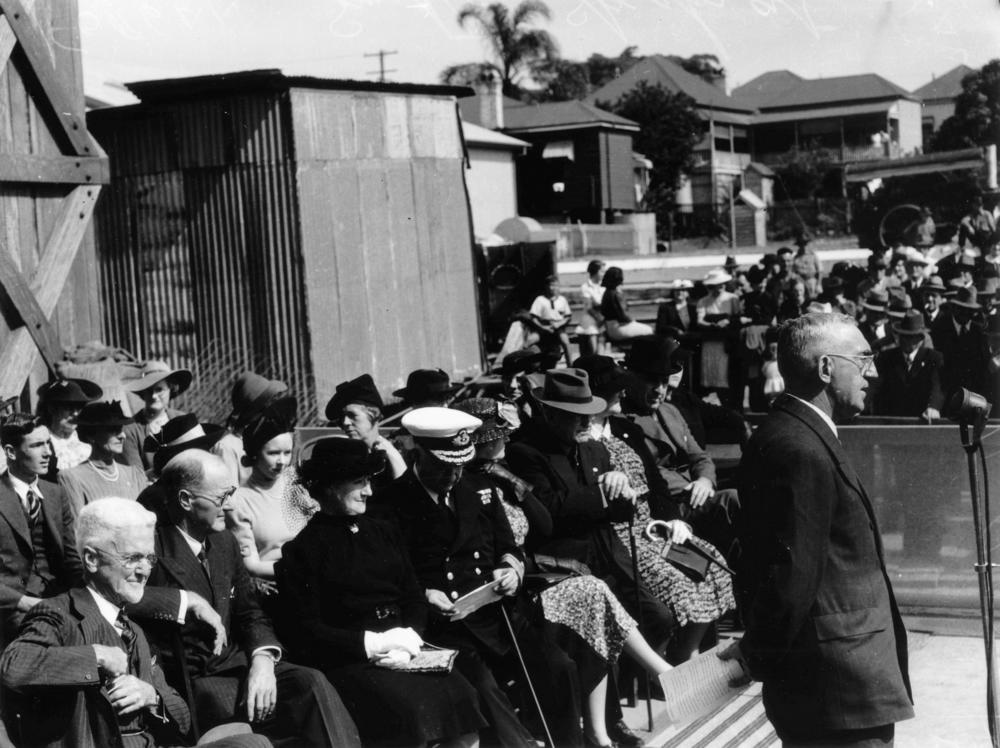
Queensland Premier William Forgan Smith speaks at Townsville's launch

== Operational history ==
Townsville entered active service in February 1942, escorting convoys between Darwin and Thursday Island. She was present in Darwin Harbour when the Japanese aircraft bombed the area on 19 February 1942, but was not damaged. Townsville remained in Darwin until July 1942, when she was sent to Sydney to begin escort duties off the east coast of Australia. The ship remained until May 1944, and despite being in the heaviest period of Japanese naval activity in Australian waters, only one ship was lost from a Townsville convoy; the iron ore transport Iron Knight was torpedoed by Japanese submarine I-21 on 8 February 1943.

In May 1944, Townsville began a five-month tour of escort and patrol duties in New Guinea, returned briefly to Australian waters for minesweeping work in November 1944, was reassigned to New Guinea at the end of the month, and remained in the area of Morotai and Biak until June 1945. Townsville was then sent to Melbourne for refitting, and was in dock when World War II ended.

The corvette received three battle honours for her wartime service: "Darwin 1942", "Pacific 1942–45", and "New Guinea 1944".

Following the war, Townsville was engaged in minesweeping and patrol duties in Australian and New Britain waters, before being decommissioned into reserve in Fremantle on 5 August 1946.

== Fate ==
Townsville was sold for scrap to the Hong Kong Delta Shipping Company on 8 August 1956.
