= Tullaberga Island =

Island in Victoria, Australia

- Location within Shire of East Gippsland

Geography
- Location: Bass Strait
- Coordinates: 37°33′23″S 149°50′42″E
- Area: 2.9 ha (7.2 acres)
- Length: 240 m (790 ft)
- Width: 200 m (700 ft)
- Highest elevation: 8.5 m (27.9 ft)

Administration
- Australia
- State: Victoria

Tullaberga Island is a small, uninhabited island off the coast of Victoria, Australia, near the town of Mallacoota. It is about 4 hectares (or 10 acres) in size. It is located west of Gabo Island and 7 kilometres (4.3 mi) east of the entrance to Mallacoota Inlet.

On 15 May 1853, the SS Monumental City, on a run from Sydney to Melbourne, ran aground off Tullaberga Island and became a total wreck.
