= Gabo Island =

Island in Victoria, Australia

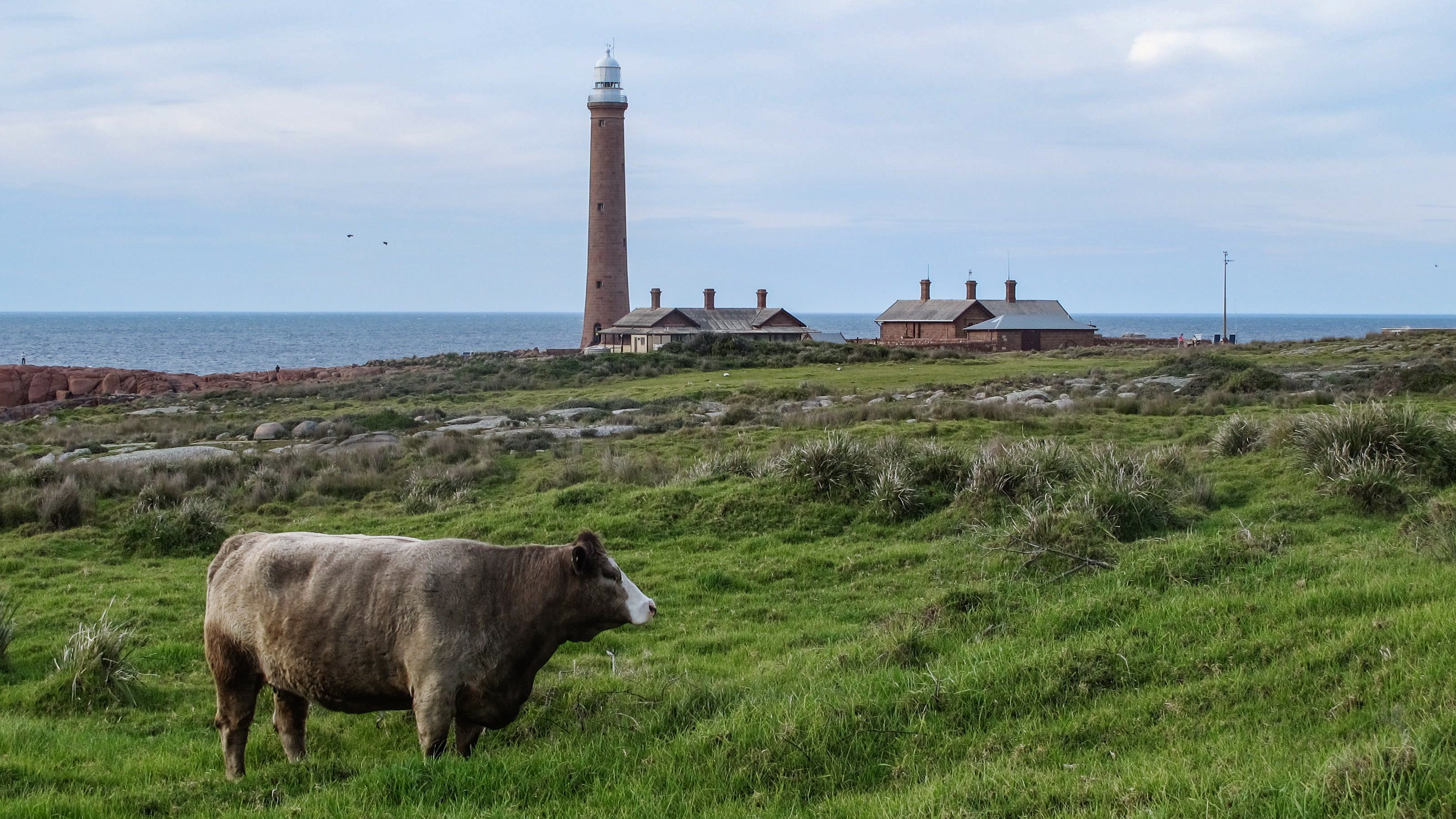
- Gabo Island Lighthouse

- Location within Shire of East Gippsland

Geography
- Location: Bass Strait
- Coordinates: 37°33′47″S 149°54′39″E
- Length: 2.4 km (1.49 mi)
- Width: 0.8 km (0.5 mi)
- Highest elevation: 52 m (171 ft)

Administration
- Australia
- State: Victoria

Gabo Island is a 154-hectare (380-acre) island located off the coast of eastern Victoria, Australia, between Mallacoota and Cape Howe on the border with New South Wales. It is separated from the mainland by a 500-metre-wide (1/4-nautical-mile) channel; access is available by arranged flights and boats. Gabo Island is a shipping reference commonly referred to in Victorian weather warnings issued by the Australian Bureau of Meteorology. The island is an unincorporated area under the direct administration of the government of Victoria.

== Gabo Island Lighthouse ==
Gabo Island is well known for its historic lighthouse. This lighthouse, Australia's second tallest, was completed in 1862 and made from pink granite quarried from the island itself. The focal plane of the light is situated at 55 metres (180 ft) above sea level, the characteristic is a group of three flashes that occurs every twenty seconds. A keeper's house is occupied by a caretaker; another building may be rented for overnight stays.

== Climate ==
Gabo Island has a moderate oceanic climate (Cfb) with mild summers and cool winters and rainfall spread throughout the year. The island features 60.8 clear days annually, higher than Melbourne's 48.6 days, mainly due to the foehn effect that is experienced in the eastern seaboard. Due to a strong foehn effect, the island registered a high of 32.1 °C on 19 September 2023.

Climate data for Gabo Island Lighthouse
| Month | Jan | Feb | Mar | Apr | May | Jun | Jul | Aug | Sep | Oct | Nov | Dec | Year |
|---|---|---|---|---|---|---|---|---|---|---|---|---|---|
| Record high °C (°F) | 40.8 (105.4) | 39.1 (102.4) | 38.6 (101.5) | 36.5 (97.7) | 26.6 (79.9) | 22.5 (72.5) | 23.3 (73.9) | 26.7 (80.1) | 34.6 (94.3) | 35.6 (96.1) | 37.2 (99.0) | 38.4 (101.1) | 40.8 (105.4) |
| Mean daily maximum °C (°F) | 21.4 (70.5) | 21.6 (70.9) | 21.0 (69.8) | 19.3 (66.7) | 16.9 (62.4) | 14.9 (58.8) | 14.2 (57.6) | 14.7 (58.5) | 16.0 (60.8) | 17.3 (63.1) | 18.5 (65.3) | 20.0 (68.0) | 18.0 (64.4) |
| Mean daily minimum °C (°F) | 15.9 (60.6) | 16.3 (61.3) | 15.5 (59.9) | 13.5 (56.3) | 11.2 (52.2) | 9.3 (48.7) | 8.2 (46.8) | 8.6 (47.5) | 9.7 (49.5) | 11.2 (52.2) | 12.8 (55.0) | 14.4 (57.9) | 12.2 (54.0) |
| Record low °C (°F) | 6.3 (43.3) | 7.8 (46.0) | 7.8 (46.0) | 6.4 (43.5) | 2.2 (36.0) | 3.3 (37.9) | 2.0 (35.6) | 2.8 (37.0) | 2.8 (37.0) | 2.8 (37.0) | 1.7 (35.1) | 7.2 (45.0) | 1.7 (35.1) |
| Average precipitation mm (inches) | 70.0 (2.76) | 67.2 (2.65) | 72.8 (2.87) | 83.7 (3.30) | 98.0 (3.86) | 102.3 (4.03) | 83.9 (3.30) | 71.4 (2.81) | 70.9 (2.79) | 74.3 (2.93) | 73.1 (2.88) | 68.3 (2.69) | 935.4 (36.83) |
| Average precipitation days | 9.4 | 9.1 | 10.6 | 11.7 | 13.4 | 14.3 | 13.6 | 13.3 | 13.2 | 13.3 | 11.6 | 10.8 | 144.3 |
Source: Bureau of Meteorology

== Birds ==
The island is home to the world's second largest colony of little penguins. Gabo and nearby Tullaberga Island have been identified by BirdLife International as an Important Bird Area because of the numbers of breeding penguins (up to 21,000 pairs) and white-faced storm petrels (up to 20,000 pairs). Concern of predation of native birds and animals led to a successful feral cat eradication program on the island between 1987 and 1991.

== Literary references ==
“The wind that blows by Gabo,” is the title of a poem by E.J. Brady.

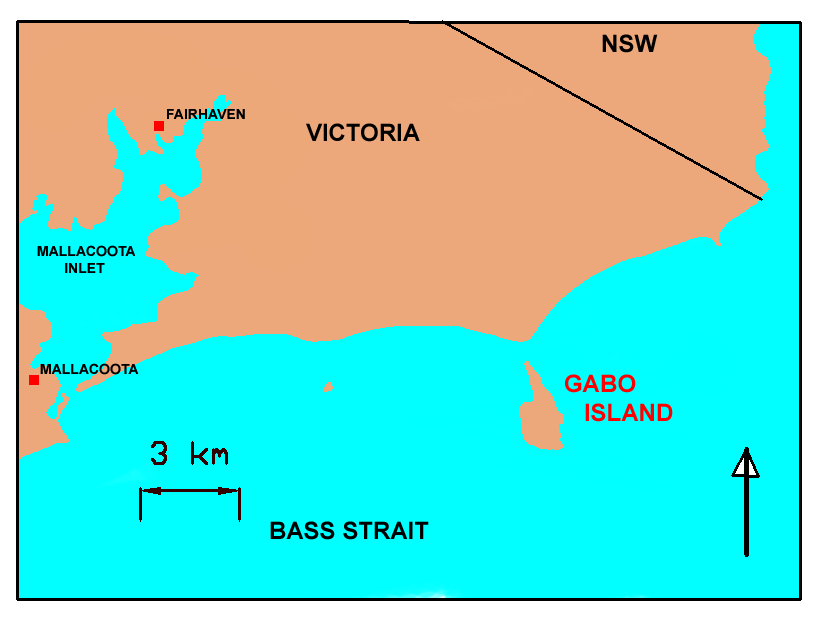
Map of Gabo Island, Victoria, Australia

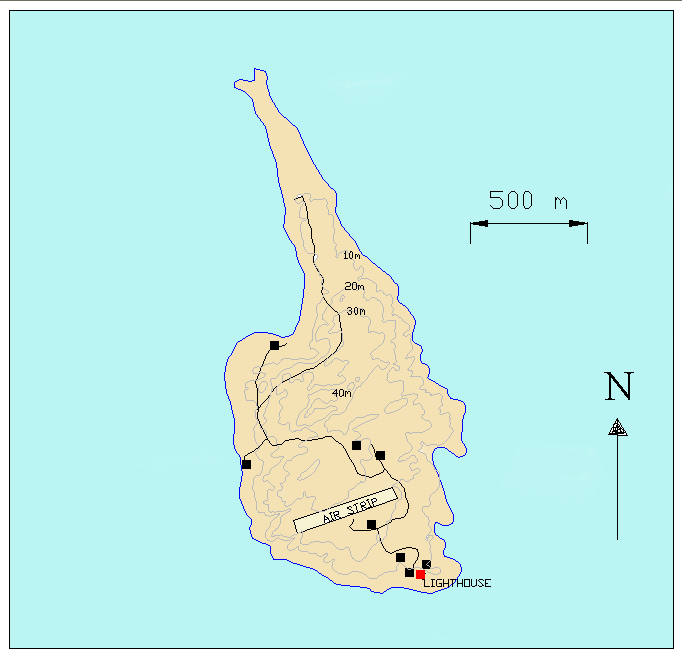
Map of Gabo Island
