= Japanese submarine I-185 =

1st class submarine of the Imperial Japanese Navy

- Sister ship I-176 at sea, 1942

History

Empire of Japan
- Name: submarine No. 163
- Builder: Yokosuka Naval Arsenal, Yokosuka, Japan
- Laid down: 9 February 1942
- Renamed: I-85 on unknown date; I-185 on 20 May 1942
- Launched: 16 September 1943
- Completed: 23 September 1943
- Fate: Sunk 22 June 1944
- Stricken: 10 September 1944

General characteristics
- Class & type: Kaidai type, KD7-class
- Displacement: 1,862 t (1,833 long tons) surfaced; 2,644 t (2,602 long tons) submerged
- Length: 105.5 m (346 ft 2 in)
- Beam: 8.25 m (27 ft 1 in)
- Draft: 4.6 m (15 ft 1 in)
- Installed power: 8,000 bhp (5,966 kW) (diesel engines); 1,800 hp (1,342 kW) (electric motors)
- Propulsion: Diesel-electric; 2 × diesel engines; 2 × electric motors
- Speed: 23 knots (43 km/h; 26 mph) surfaced; 8 knots (15 km/h; 9.2 mph) submerged
- Range: 8,000 nmi (15,000 km; 9,200 mi) at 16 knots (30 km/h; 18 mph) surfaced; 50 nmi (93 km; 58 mi) at 5 knots (9.3 km/h; 5.8 mph) submerged
- Test depth: 80 m (262 ft)
- Complement: 86
- Armament: 6 × 533 mm (21 in) torpedo tubes (all bow); 1 × 120 mm (4.7 in) deck gun; 1 × twin 25 mm (1.0 in) Type 96 AA gun

I-185 (originally I-85) was an Imperial Japanese Navy Kaidai type cruiser submarine of the KD7 sub-class commissioned in 1943. During World War II, she served in the Central and Southwest Pacific Ocean before she was sunk with all hands by an American destroyer in June 1944.

== Design and description ==
The submarines of the KD7 sub-class were medium-range attack submarines developed from the preceding KD6 sub-class. They displaced 1,862 metric tons (1,833 long tons) surfaced and 2,644 metric tons (2,602 long tons) submerged. The submarines were 105.5 meters (346 ft 2 in) long and had a beam of 8.25 meters (27 ft 1 in) and a draft of 4.6 meters (15 ft 1 in). They had a diving depth of 80 m (262 ft) and a complement of 86 officers and crewmen.

For surface running, the submarines were powered by two 4,000-brake-horsepower (2,983 kW) diesel engines, each driving one propeller shaft. When submerged, each propeller was driven by a 900-horsepower (671 kW) electric motor. They could reach 23 knots (43 km/h; 26 mph) on the surface and 8 knots (15 km/h; 9.2 mph) submerged. On the surface, the KD7s had a range of 8,000 nautical miles (15,000 km; 9,200 mi) at 16 knots (30 km/h; 18 mph); submerged, they had a range of 50 nmi (93 km; 58 mi) at 5 knots (9.3 km/h; 5.8 mph).

The submarines were armed with six internal 53.3 cm (21.0 in) torpedo tubes, all in the bow. They carried one reload for each tube, for a total of 12 torpedoes. They were originally intended to be armed with two twin-gun mounts for the 25 mm (1.0 in) Type 96 anti-aircraft gun, but a 120 mm (4.7 in) deck gun for combat on the surface was substituted for one 25 mm mount during construction.

== Construction and commissioning ==
I-185 was laid down at the Yokosuka Naval Arsenal in Yokosuka, Japan, as Submarine No. 163 on 9 February 1942. She soon was named I-85, and she was renamed I-185 on 20 May 1942. She was launched on 16 September 1942 and completed and commissioned on 23 September 1943.

== Service history ==
=== September 1943–January 1944 ===
On the day of her commissioning, I-185 was attached to the Sasebo Naval District and assigned to Submarine Squadron 11 in the 1st Fleet, an element of the Combined Fleet, for workups. Submarine Squadron 11 was reassigned to the 6th Fleet, another element of the Combined Fleet, on 25 November 1943.

I-185 arrived at Sasebo, Japan, on 2 December 1943. On 20 December 1943, she was reassigned to Submarine Squadron 22 in the 6th Fleet along with the submarines I-177, I-180, and I-181.

I-185 departed Sasebo on 5 January 1944 bound for Truk Atoll in the Caroline Islands, which she reached early on the morning of 12 January 1944, entering Truk Lagoon via North Pass.

=== Southwest Pacific ===
On 22 January 1944, I-185 was reassigned to the Southeast Area Fleet. She took aboard stores from the auxiliary submarine tender Heian Maru on 23 January 1944 and got underway from Truk on 25 January bound for Rabaul on New Britain in the Bismarck Archipelago, but a mechanical failure forced her to return to Truk the same day. After repairs, she got back underway on 27 January 1944 and arrived at Rabaul on 31 January 1944.

On the day I-185 arrived at Rabaul, preliminary actions preceding the Battle of the Green Islands began when a 360-man Allied raiding force landed on Nissan Island in the Green Islands. The commander of the Southeast Area Fleet, Vice Admiral Gunichi Mikawa, immediately ordered I-185 and the submarine I-169 to take aboard the Wada Detachment — a 123-man naval infantry force — to reinforce the Japanese garrison on Nissan. I-185 immediately began to embark 77 of the naval infantrymen and load food and ammunition for the Japanese forces on Nissan.

I-185 and I-169 departed Rabaul on 1 February 1944 and headed for Nissan. The submarines arrived at Nissan at 05:00 on 3 February 1944, but heavy seas prevented them from disembarking all of the naval infantrymen. After disembarking 77 men between them, they headed back to Rabaul with a combined 46 naval infantry personnel still aboard. I-185 arrived at Rabaul on 4 February 1944.

At 12:00 on 12 February 1944, I-185 departed Rabaul to carry supplies to Japanese forces at the Iboki Plantation on New Britain. She arrived at the plantation on 13 February 1944, unloaded her cargo, and immediately headed back to Rabaul, where she arrived on 16 February 1944.

I-185 set out from Rabaul on 24 February 1944 on another supply run, this time bound for Buka Island in the northwestern Solomon Islands. While at sea, she received orders on 28 February 1944 to abort her supply run and search for a United States Navy task force reported to be in the vicinity. She encountered no American ships and returned to Rabaul on 1 March 1944.

On 4 March 1944, I-185 again got underway from Rabaul to transport supplies to Buka Island. While she was on the surface east of New Ireland recharging her batteries on 5 March 1944, an Allied bomber — probably a Lockheed Ventura of the Royal New Zealand Air Force′s No. 2 Squadron — attacked her, scoring near-misses which knocked out her gyrocompass and caused a serious fuel leak that contaminated a quarter of her battery cells. The damage prompted I-185 to abort her supply run and turn back toward Rabaul. During her return voyage a fire broke out in her battery compartment on 10 March 1944, and when she contacted Rabaul that day, she received orders to make for Truk rather than Rabaul because of a recent Allied air raid on Rabaul. She arrived at Truk on 17 March 1944 and began emergency repairs.

I-185 departed Truk on 22 March 1944 to head for Japan, but a malfunctioning gyrocompass forced her to put back into port at Truk for repairs. She again got underway on 23 March 1944 bound for Sasebo, which she reached on 31 March 1944. She underwent repairs at Sasebo.

=== Central Pacific ===
With her repairs complete, I-185 departed Kure on 11 June 1944 on a supply run to Wewak, New Guinea, her decks piled high with drums of rice intended for Japanese forces fighting in the New Guinea campaign. Heavy seas washed most of the drums overboard.

On 13 June 1944, amid indications of an imminent American invasion of the Mariana Islands, the commander-in-chief of the Combined Fleet, Admiral Soemu Toyoda, activated Operation A-Go for the defense of the Marianas. The same day, the commander of the 6th Fleet, Vice Admiral Takeo Takagi, ordered all available submarines under his command to deploy in the central Pacific Ocean east of Marianas as part of the defense. The Marianas campaign began with American amphibious landings on Saipan on 15 June 1944. With the Battle of Saipan underway, Takagi's ability to command the 6th Fleet from the fleet's headquarters on Saipan was disrupted, and command of the fleet passed to the commander of Submarine Squadron 7, Rear Admiral Noboru Owada at Truk Atoll in the Caroline Islands. I-185 transmitted her last routine situation report at 22:30 Japan Standard Time on 15 June 1944.

On 16 June 1944, I-185 received orders to abort her supply run and join the submarines I-5, I-6, I-41, and I-184 in forming a north–south picket line in the Pacific Ocean 300 nautical miles (560 km; 350 mi) east of the Marianas, with I-185′s picket station at the northern end of the line. The Battle of the Philippine Sea which followed on 19–20 June 1944 resulted in a major defeat of Japanese naval forces.

=== Loss ===
At 09:03 on 22 June 1944, the U.S. Navy destroyer USS Newcomb (DD-586) — serving as flagship of the screen of a convoy of troop transports bound for Saipan — gained sonar contact on I-185. She conducted a depth-charge attack, then lost contact. The fast minesweeper USS Chandler (DMS-9) joined the action and made a depth-charge attack at 10:23 which resulted in oil coming to the surface. Newcomb made another attack, without any visible results, but a final depth-charge attack by Chandler at 11:44 resulted in a large explosion deep underwater, followed by cork slabs, wood, diesel oil, and human entrails reaching the surface at 15°50′N 145°08′E. It marked the destruction of I-185.

Later on 22 June 1944, Owada ordered I-185 and all but six of the other Japanese submarines in the Marianas area to withdraw from the Marianas, but I-185 did not acknowledge the order. On 12 July 1944, the Imperial Japanese Navy declared I-185 to be presumed lost with all 95 hands in the vicinity of Saipan. The Japanese struck I-185 from the Navy List on 10 September 1944.
