= Japanese submarine I-171 =

1st class submarine of the Imperial Japanese Navy

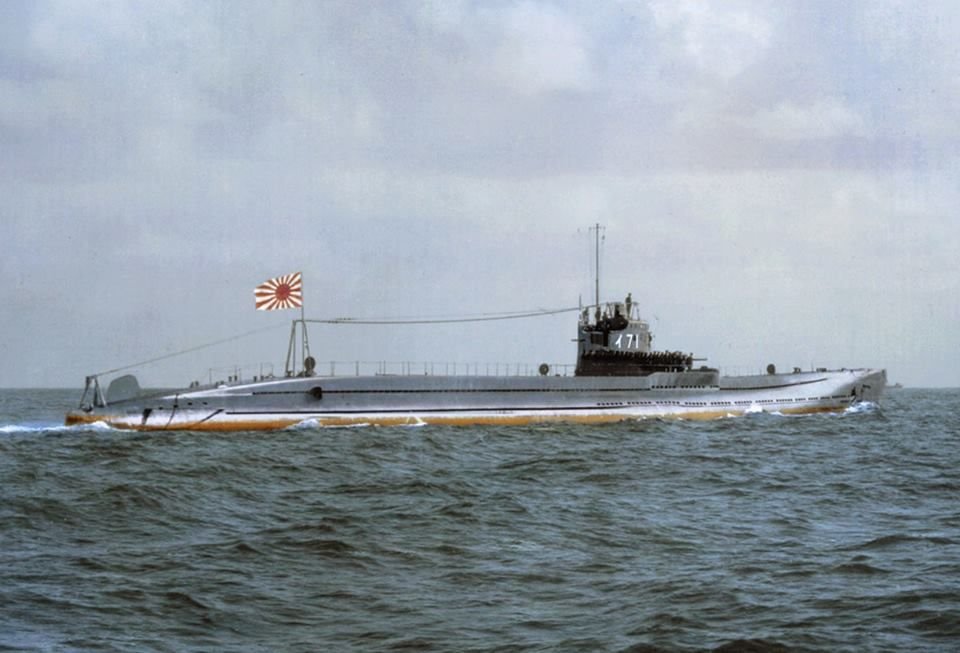
- I-171 departing Kobe on her maiden voyage, 25 December 1941

History

Empire of Japan
- Name: I-71
- Builder: Kawasaki Kobe Yard, Kobe, Japan
- Laid down: 15 February 1933
- Launched: 15 August 1934
- Completed: 24 December 1935
- Commissioned: 24 December 1935
- Renamed: I-171, 20 May 1942
- Fate: Sunk 1 February 1944
- Stricken: 30 April 1944

General characteristics
- Class & type: KD6 Type, Kadai type submarine
- Displacement: 1,400 (1,785 maximum) tons surfaced; 2,440 tons submerged
- Length: 322 ft 10 in (98.4 m)
- Beam: 26 ft 11 in (8.2 m)
- Draught: 15 ft 0 in (4.6 m)
- Propulsion: Twin shaft Kampon 9,000 bhp (6,711 kW)/two stroke diesels
- Speed: 23 knots (43 km/h; 26 mph) diesel; 8.2 knots (15.2 km/h; 9.4 mph) electric
- Range: 14,000 nmi (26,000 km; 16,000 mi)
- Test depth: 230 ft (70 m)
- Complement: 60–84 officers and enlisted
- Armament: 6 x torpedo tubes/14 21 in (533 mm) torpedoes; 1 x 100 mm (3.9 in) AA gun; 1 × 13.2 mm (0.52 in) AA gun

I-71, later I-171, was a Kaidai-class cruiser submarine of the KD6 sub-class built for the Imperial Japanese Navy during the 1930s. She served in World War II, and took part in operations supporting the attack on Pearl Harbor, the Battle of Midway, and the Aleutian Islands campaign. She was sunk on 1 February 1944 after being detected on the surface by U.S. Navy destroyers off Buka Island.

== Construction and commissioning ==
Built by Kawasaki at Kobe, Japan, I-71 was laid down on 15 February 1933 and launched on 25 August 1934. She was completed and commissioned on 24 December 1935.

== Service history ==
=== Pre-World War II ===
Upon commissioning, I-71 was assigned to the Kure Naval District.

As the Imperial Japanese Navy began to deploy in preparation for the impending conflict in the Pacific, I-71 was assigned to Operation Z, the planned Japanese attack on Pearl Harbor, as a unit of Submarine Division 20 in Submarine Squadron 3, which in turn was assigned to the 6th Fleet′s Advanced Expeditionary Force. On 11 November 1941, I-71 departed Saeki, Japan, bound for Kwajalein in company with I-68, I-69, I-70, I-72, and I-73. She arrived at Kwajalein on 20 November 1941.

=== World War II ===
==== First war patrol ====
On 23 November 1941, I-69 departed Kwajalein to begin what would become her first war patrol. She received the message "Climb Mount Niitaka 1208" (Japanese: Niitakayama nobore 1208) from the Combined Fleet on 2 December 1941, indicating that war with the Allies would commence on 8 December 1941 Japan time (7 December 1941 in Hawaii).

On 5 December 1941, I-71 conducted a reconnaissance of Alalakeiki Channel in the Hawaiian Islands between Maui and Kahoolawe. She and I-73 later reconnoitered Lahaina Roads between Maui and Lanai, finding no U.S. warships there.

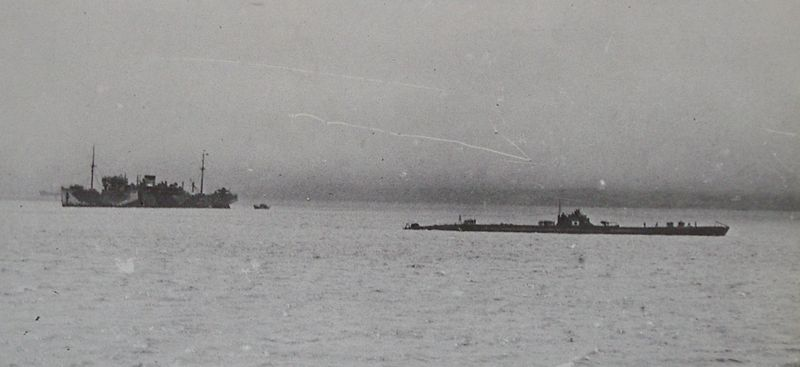
I-171 (right) anchored at Paramushiro in the Kurile Islands in June 1943. The auxiliary submarine tender Heian Maru is at left

On 7 December 1941, the submarines of Submarine Squadron 3 operated south of Oahu to intercept any U.S. ships which attempted to sortie from Pearl Harbor during or after the Japanese attack there that day that brought Japan and the United States into World War II. I-71, I-72, and I-73 patrolled between 25 and 50 nautical miles (46 and 93 km; 29 and 58 mi) southeast of Oahu. I-71 was subjected to several depth charge attacks during these operations.

Departing Hawaiian waters, I-71 surfaced off Johnston Island on 21 December 1941 to attempt a bombardment of the island with her deck gun, but coastal artillery opened fire on her and forced her to submerge. She returned to Kwajalein on 28 December 1941.

==== Second war patrol ====
On 12 January 1942, I-69 departed Kwajalein along with I-72 and I-73 to begin her second war patrol. The three submarines were assigned to relieve the submarines I-18, I-22, and I-24 on a submarine picket line in Hawaiian waters. At dawn on 28 January 1942 she was in Alenuihaha Channel off Maui's Hana Coast 30 nautical miles (56 km; 35 mi) north of ʻUpolu Point, the northernmost point on the island of Hawaii, when she attacked a three-ship convoy on a voyage from Kahului, Maui, to Hilo, Hawaii, consisting of the 622-ton United States Army Transport USAT General Royal T. Frank, the small cargo ship Kalae with a barge in tow, and their escort, the destroyer minesweeper USS Trever (DMS-16). I-71 fired two torpedoes at General Royal T. Frank which missed, then fired a third torpedo that struck the transport, which exploded and sank in less than 30 seconds. Of the 60 people aboard — including 26 U.S. Army recruits — Kalae rescued 36. I-71 returned to Kwajalein on 16 February 1942.

==== February–May 1942 ====
On 18 February 1942, I-71 departed Kwajalein to patrol in defense of Rabaul, which the U.S. Navy's Task Force 11 was approaching with an intention to launch air raids against Japanese forces and bases there. After Task Force 11 lost the element of surprise, however, it withdrew, and I-71 was diverted to a patrol area east of Wake Island. After uneventful operations, she proceeded to Japan, where she arrived on 6 March 1942 at Kure. During her stay at Kure, Submarine Division 20 was disbanded, and she was reassigned to Submarine Division 12.

I-71 got underway from Kure on 15 April 1942 to begin her third war patrol, operating as part of a submarine patrol line with I-72. This patrol also was uneventful, and she concluded it with her arrival at Kwajalein on 10 May 1942. During her stay at Kwajalein, she was renumbered I-171 on 20 May 1942.

==== Midway operation ====
On 24 May 1942, I-171 departed Kwajalein to participate in Operation MI, the planned Japanese invasion of Midway Atoll. Her first task was to support a preliminary phase of the Midway operation, Operation K-2, which called for the submarines I-121 and I-123 to refuel two Kawanishi H8K (Allied reporting name "Emily") flying boats at the French Frigate Shoals in the Northwest Hawaiian Islands so that the two aircraft could make a reconnaissance flight over Pearl Harbor, while the submarine I-122 patrolled south of Pearl Harbor to rescue the crews of the aircraft if they were shot down and I-171 operated east of the French Frigate Shoals to provide a radio beacon for the planes. When I-123 arrived off the French Frigate Shoals in late May 1942, however, she found the U.S. Navy seaplane tenders USS Ballard (AVD-10) and USS Thornton (AVD-11) already operating U.S. Navy flying boats there, and Operation K-2 was cancelled.

As part of Submarine Squadron 3, I-171 then was ordered to join other units of her squadron — the submarines I-168, I-169, I-174, and I-175 — in the Pacific Ocean between 20°00′N 166°20′W and 23°30′N 166°20′W, tasked with intercepting American reinforcements approaching Midway from the main Hawaiian Islands to the southeast. During the Battle of Midway, fought from 4 to 7 June 1942, I-171′s squadron mate I-168 torpedoed the aircraft carrier USS Yorktown (CV-5), but the rest of the patrol line had no impact on the battle, and I-171 saw no action during the battle. The Japanese suffered a decisive defeat and cancelled the invasion of Midway. I-171 concluded her patrol with her arrival at Kwajalein with I-174 and I-175 on 20 June 1942.

==== Fourth war patrol ====
On 8 July 1942, I-171 departed Kwajalein on her fourth war patrol, tasked to conduct a reconnaissance of Fiji and the Samoan Islands during the patrol. Between 16 and 24 July 1942 she operated in the Fiji area, then, after reporting no ships in the harbor at Suva, proceeded to Samoa, where she reconnoitered Pago-Pago on 28 July 1942. On 29 July 1942, she fired a single torpedo at an unidentified merchant ship off Tutuila, but missed. She concluded her patrol by arriving at Truk on 12 August 1942.

I-171 departed Truk on 17 August 1942 bound for Japan. She arrived at Kure on 24 August 1942 and underwent an overhaul there.

==== Aleutians campaign ====
After the completion of her overhaul, I-171 spent the winter, spring, and much of the summer of 1943 involved in the Aleutian Islands campaign, which had begun in mid-1942. On 15 February 1943, she left Kure to carry supplies to the Japanese garrison on Kiska in the Aleutian Islands, arriving there on 26 February 1943. She departed Kiska on 2 March 1943 and proceeded to Paramushiro in the Kuril Islands, where she arrived on 18 March 1943. After refueling from the oiler Teiyō Maru on 20 March 1943, she departed Paramushiro on her fifth war patrol, operating in the Bering Sea in the vicinity of 52°55′N 174°00′E as part of a submarine scouting line. After an uneventful patrol there, she returned to Japan, arriving at Yokosuka on 6 April 1943. Her squadron, Submarine Squadron 12, was assigned to the 5th Fleet′s Northern District Force on 13 May 1943.

In the Aleutians, meanwhile, the Battle of Attu had begun on 11 May 1943 with U.S. landings on Attu Island. On 21 May 1943, with the situation on Attu deteriorating — ultimately the battle there ended on 30 May 1943 with the annihilation of the Japanese garrison — the Japanese Imperial General Headquarters decided to evacuate the isolated garrison on Kiska, and on the same day I-171 departed Yokosuka to begin her sixth war patrol, bound for Kiska. While she was en route, she survived an attack by a U.S. patrol plane. After an otherwise quiet patrol, she returned to Paramushiro on 16 June 1943 and refueled from Teiyō Maru. On 26 June 1943 she set out from Paramushiro for her seventh war patrol, operating with I-175 in the vicinity of Amchitka. This patrol also was uneventful, and she returned to Paramushiro on 3 August 1943.

While I-171 was on patrol, the last Japanese troops were evacuated from Kiska on 28 July 1943. Allied forces did not detect the evacuation and launched a full-scale invasion of unoccupied Kiska in Operation Cottage on 15 August 1943, but Japanese involvement in the Aleutians campaign had ended with the 28 July evacuation. On 5 August 1943, I-171 departed Paramushiro bound for Kure, where she arrived on 10 August 1943. While she was at Kure, Submarine Division 12 was reassigned to Submarine Squadron 3.

==== Operations from Truk ====
I-171 got underway from Kure on 17 September 1943 bound for Truk, which she reached on 25 September 1943. She departed Truk on 7 October 1943 with the commander of Submarine Division 12, Captain Hajime Kobayashi, on board to begin her eighth war patrol, tasked with conducting a reconnaissance of the New Hebrides. While she was at sea, Kobayashi received orders from the commander of the 6th Fleet, Vice Admiral Takeo Takagi, to take temporary command of I-171 and the submarines I-21 and I-32 and intercept a convoy of six U.S. Navy fleet oilers that the submarine I-36 had sighted south of the Hawaiian Islands. However, a Kawanishi H8K ("Emily") flying boat dispatched from Jaluit to find the convoy failed to locate it. I-171 returned to Truk on 15 November 1943.

While at Truk during December 1943 and early January 1944, I-169 took torpedoes, ammunition, and stores aboard from the auxiliary submarine tender Heian Maru. On 9 January 1944, she got underway from Truk bound for Rabaul, which she reached on 13 January 1944. She departed Rabaul on 17 January 1944 and proceeded to Gali, New Guinea. She arrived there on 22 January 1944, picked up passengers, and departed the same day for Rabaul, where she arrived on 26 January 1944. On 30 January, she departed Rabaul to make a supply run to the Japanese garrison on Buka Island, carrying rubber supply containers on her deck.

==== Loss ====
On 1 February 1944, the U.S. Navy destroyers USS Guest (DD-472) and USS Hudson (DD-475) detected I-171 on the surface on radar 15 nautical miles (28 km; 17 mi) west of Buka Island at a range of 3,500 yards (3,200 m). I-171 submerged, but the two destroyers gained sonar contact on her and both depth charged her, sinking her at 05°37′S 154°14′E.

The Japanese last heard from I-171 on 1 February 1944. They attempted to contact her unsuccessfully several times on 3 February 1944, and concern for her grew when she did not return to Rabaul as scheduled at 18:00 on 5 February 1944. On 12 March 1944, the Japanese declared her to be presumed lost off Buka Island with the loss of all 91 men on board. On 14 March 1944, U.S. Navy codebreakers intercepted and decrypted a message from the commander of the Southeastern Area Submarine Force which read, "I-171 departed Rabaul January 30, arrived Buka Feb. 2 [blurred number might be 1 or might be 2]. Completed unloading men and cargo and (continued on special transportation duties). Has not been heard from since February 1. According to report of naval force at Buka, an enemy destroyer was (sighted) to west of Buka that date. It is assumed that Captain and all hands died in battle. -----."

I-171 was stricken from the Navy list on 30 April 1944.
