= Japanese submarine I-72 =

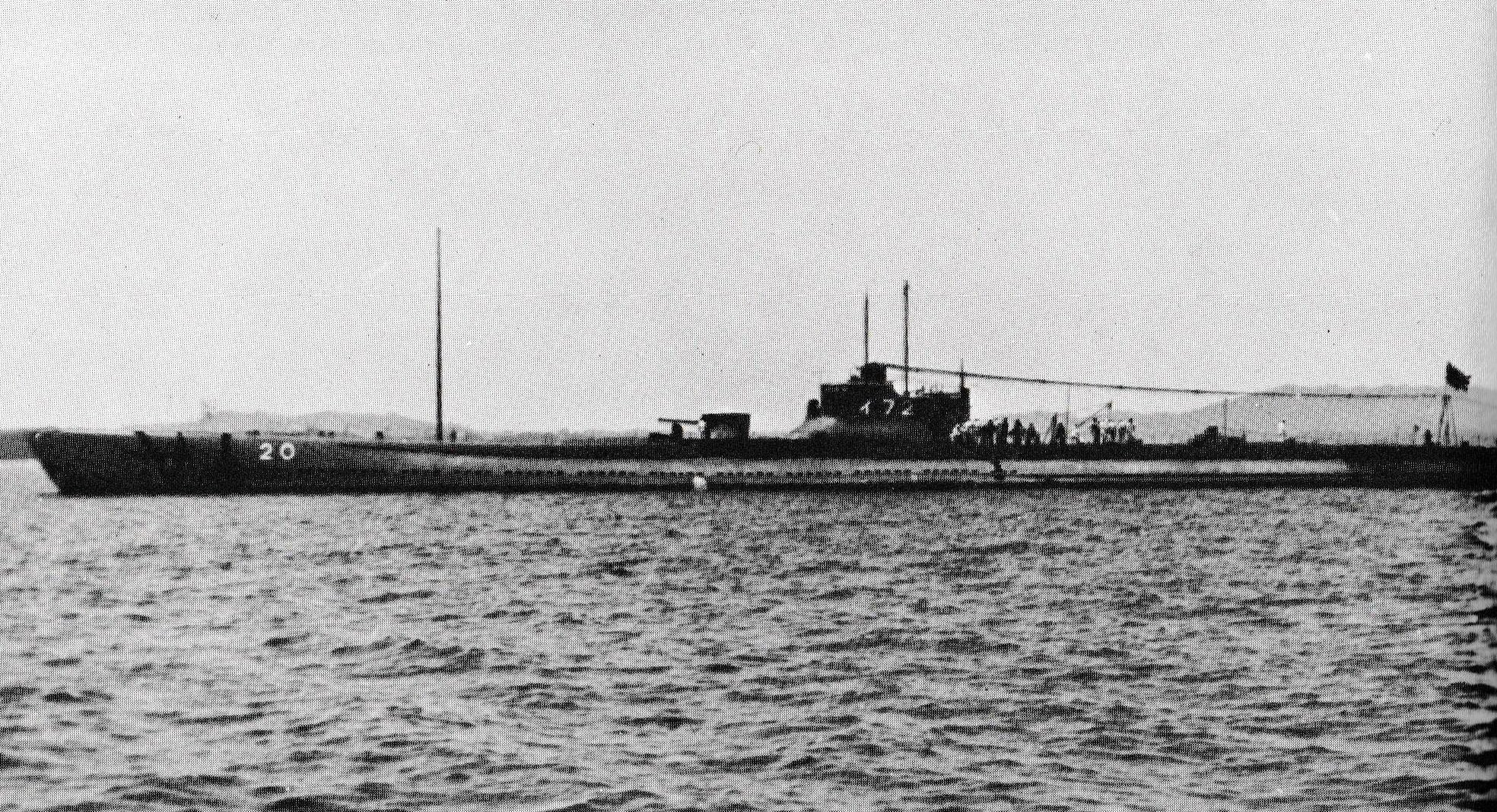

History

Empire of Japan
- Name: I-72
- Builder: Mitsubishi Kobe Yard, Kobe, Japan
- Laid down: 16 December 1933
- Launched: 6 April 1935
- Completed: 7 January 1937
- Commissioned: 7 January 1937
- Renamed: I-172, 20 May 1942
- Stricken: 15 December 1942
- Fate: Sunk October–November 1942 (see text)

General characteristics
- Class & type: KD6 Type, Kadai type submarine
- Displacement: 1,400 (1,785 maximum) tons surfaced; 2,440 tons submerged
- Length: 322 ft 10 in (98.4 m)
- Beam: 26 ft 11 in (8.2 m)
- Draught: 15 ft 0 in (4.6 m)
- Propulsion: Twin shaft Kampon 9,000 bhp (6,711 kW)/two stroke diesels
- Speed: 23 knots (43 km/h; 26 mph) diesel; 8.2 knots (15.2 km/h; 9.4 mph) electric
- Range: 14,000 nmi (26,000 km; 16,000 mi)
- Test depth: 230 ft (70 m)
- Complement: 60–84 officers and enlisted
- Armament: 6 x torpedo tubes/14 21 in (533 mm) torpedoes; 1 x 100 mm (3.9 in) AA gun; 1 × 13.2 mm (0.52 in) AA gun

I-72, later I-172, was a Kaidai-class cruiser submarine of the KD6 sub-class built for the Imperial Japanese Navy (IJN) during the 1930s. She served in the early months of World War II, supporting the attack on Pearl Harbor, patrolling in Hawaiian waters in early 1942, and taking part in the Guadalcanal campaign before she was sunk in November 1942.

== Construction and commissioning ==
Built by Mitsubishi at Kobe, Japan, I-72 was laid down on 16 December 1933 and launched on 6 April 1935. She was completed and accepted into Imperial Japanese Navy service on 7 January 1937.

== Service history ==
=== Pre-World War II ===
Upon commissioning, I-72 was assigned to Submarine Division 20 in the Kure Naval District. While operating on the surface in limited visibility on 5 May 1938, she collided at about 10:00 with the Japanese 60-gross register ton motor vessel Hachiyo Maru in the Seto Inland Sea west of Kurahashi-jima, Japan. I-72 suffered only minor damage, but Hachiyo Maru sank about two minutes after the collision.

As the Imperial Japanese Navy began to deploy in preparation for the impending conflict in the Pacific, I-72 departed Seaki, Japan, along with the submarines I-68, I-69, I-70, I-71, and I-73. She arrived at Kwajalein Atoll on 20 November 1941.

=== World War II ===
==== First war patrol ====
On 23 November 1941, I-72 departed Kwajalein to begin what would become her first war patrol. She received the message "Climb Mount Niitaka 1208" (Japanese: Niitakayama nobore 1208) from the Combined Fleet on 2 December 1941, indicating that war with the Allies would commence on 8 December 1941 Japan time (7 December 1941 in Hawaii). She arrived in the Hawaiian Islands on 5 December 1941 and conducted a reconnaissance of Kalohi Channel between Lānaʻi and Molokaʻi. She then investigated Lahaina Roads off Maui to determine if the U.S. fleet was anchored there, and on 6 December 1941 she radioed the Japanese Carrier Striking Force with the news that no U.S. warships were at Lahaina Roads.

On 7 December 1941, I-72 took up station off Pearl Harbor between I-70 and I-73. The Japanese attack on Pearl Harbor took place that morning, bringing Japan and the United States into World War II. On the evening of 16 December 1941, she surfaced off Hilo Bay and shelled Hilo, Hawaii, with her 4.7-inch (119 mm) deck gun. On 19 December 1941, she torpedoed the American 5,113-gross register ton cargo steamer Prusa 150 nautical miles (278 km; 173 mi) south of Oahu. Prusa, which was on a voyage from Honolulu, Hawaii, to Baltimore, Maryland, sank at 16°45′N 156°00′W nine minutes later. I-72 surfaced to identify Prusa and illuminated Prusa′s lifeboats with her searchlight, then submerged and continued her patrol. She returned to Kwajalein on 28 December 1941.

==== Second war patrol ====
On 12 January 1942, I-72 departed Kwajalein with I-71 and I-73 for her second war patrol. This patrol also was in Hawaiian waters, where I-71, I-72, and I-73 relieved the submarines I-18, I-22, and I-24 on a picket line. I-72 arrived in her patrol area on 21 January 1942.

On 23 January, I-72 encountered the 7,383-displacement ton United States Navy oiler USS Neches (AO-5), which was proceeding unescorted to a rendezvous with Task Force 11. I-72′s first torpedo, fired at 03:10, struck Neches amidships but failed to detonate. Her second torpedo hit Neches on her starboard side aft, destroying her engine room. I-72′s third torpedo struck Neches on her port side. When I-72 surfaced to finish off Neches with her deck gun, Neches opened fire with 3-inch (76.2 mm) and 5-inch (127 mm) guns and forced the submarine to submerge again. Neches then listed to starboard and sank by the bow at 21°01′N 160°06′W. The loss of Neches prevented Task Force 11 — centered around the aircraft carrier USS Lexington (CV-2) — from refueling, forcing it to cancel a planned air strike against Japanese forces on Wake Island and return to Pearl Harbor.

On 16 February 1942, I-72 returned to Kwajalein.

==== Third war patrol ====
I-72 departed Kwajalein on 18 February 1942 with I-71 to patrol in defense of Rabaul, which the U.S. Navy's Task Force 11 was approaching with an intention to launch air raids against Japanese forces and bases there. After Task Force 11 lost the element of surprise, however, it withdrew, and the two submarines were diverted to patrol areas east of Wake Island. After an uneventful patrol, I-72 proceeded to Japan, where she arrived on 5 March 1942 for repairs at Kure.

==== March–September 1942 ====
While I-72 was at Kure, Submarine Division 20 was disbanded on 20 March 1942, and she was reassigned that day to Submarine Division 12. She departed Kure on 15 April 1942, visited Yokosuka from 3 to 10 May 1942, and returned to Kure on 12 May 1942 for additional repairs. While she was there, she was redesignated I-172 on 20 May 1942. With her repairs complete, she departed Kure on 22 August 1942 and proceeded to Truk, where she arrived on 28 August 1942.

I-172 departed Truk on 30 August 1942. The Guadalcanal campaign had begun on 7 August 1942, and her main task was to perform a reconnaissance mission in the Guadalcanal area. She returned to Truk on 30 September 1942.

==== Fourth war patrol ====
With the commander of Submarine Division 12 embarked, I-172 departed Truk on 12 October 1942 for her fourth war patrol. Her orders called for her to support an attack by Type A midget submarines against Allied shipping off Guadalcanal's Lunga Point. On 14 October, however, she was ordered to proceed instead to join the submarine I-26 south of San Cristóbal to recharge the batteries of Type A midget submarines carried aboard the seaplane tender Chiyoda. Her orders again changed on 15 October 1942, when she was ordered to join the submarines I-1, I-2, I-3, I-4, I-5, I-7, I-17, I-22, and I-31 — collectively designated "Group A" — in forming a picket line southeast of Guadalcanal. She remained on this duty through the end of the Battle of the Santa Cruz Islands of 25–27 October 1942. Group A was dissolved on 28 October 1942, and I-172 then deployed to waters southwest of San Cristóbal with orders attack Allied shipping supplying American forces on Guadalcanal.

==== Loss ====
Sources agree that I-172 was sunk while operating southwest of San Cristóbal, but disagree on the date and cause.

A Naval History and Heritage Command document entitled "Appendix 3: Submarines Sunk by Patrol Squadrons During World War II" notes that the U.S. Navy destroyer minesweeper USS Southard (DMS-10) is given official credit for sinking I-172 at the southern end of Indispensable Strait at 10°13′S 161°09′E on 10 November 1942 but adds that Japanese records indicate that Southard actually sank the Japanese submarine I-15. The document claims that the Imperial Japanese Navy declared I-172 missing after 28 October 1942 and attributes I-172′s sinking to a U.S. Navy PBY-5 Catalina flying boat of Patrol Squadron 11 (VP-11) that sighted a Japanese submarine on 29 October 1942 at 13°15′S 162°45′E and dropped two 650-pound (295 kg) depth charges on it after it crash-dived. A large quantity of oil appeared on the surface and was still visible the next day.

According to The Imperial Japanese Navy Page (combinedfleet.com), on 3 November 1942 I-172 sighted a convoy of American transports southwest of San Cristóbal bound for Lunga Point on Guadalcanal. She transmitted her last message — a sighting report of seven transports steaming at 12 knots (22 km/h; 14 mph) on a course of 300 degrees — at 04:10. One of the convoy's escorts, the U.S. Navy light cruiser USS Helena (CL-50), detected a surface target on radar bearing 046 true at a range of 16,000 yards (14,600 m) and the destroyer USS McCalla (DD-488) left the convoy at 05:20 to investigate. McCalla sighted a nearly stationary submarine bearing 090 true at a range of 2,000 yards (1,830 m) and accelerated with an intention to ram the submarine. The submarine submerged at 05:32 and turned sharply toward McCalla, which sighted a periscope off her port bow at a range of 100 to 200 yards (91 to 180 m). McCalla began a depth charge attack at 05:37, dropping six 600-pound (272 kg) and five 300-pound (136 kg) depth charges set to explode at a depth of 50 to 100 feet (15 to 30 m). Thirty seconds after the explosion of the last depth charge, McCalla′s crew heard another underwater explosion, then a second explosion 30 seconds after that, and finally a third explosion after another three minutes. After the third explosion, McCalla lost her sonar contact on the submarine, and her crew noticed a heavy smell of oil near 10°53′S 161°50′E.

The Dictionary of American Naval Fighting Ships notes that McCalla conducted a depth charge attack on 2 November 1942, but makes no mention of McCalla sinking a submarine on either 2 or 3 November 1942. It claims that early on the morning of 10 November 1942, while passing between San Cristobal and Guadalcanal en route to Aola Bay on Guadalcanal, Southard encountered I-172 operating on the surface. Southard immediately slowed to 10 knots (19 km/h; 12 mph) and opened fire. I-172 submerged, and Southard commenced her first depth-charge attack. Southard lost contact with I-172 and did not regain it again until 06:07, almost three and one-half hours later. Over the next three hours Southard made five more depth-charge runs. After the last barrage, she sighted oil on the surface. She moved in to investigate. Upon reaching the oil slick, Southard's crew could find no further evidence of damage, and she steamed on through the slick. When she reached a point about 2,000 yards (1,830 m) on the other side of the slick, the submarine surfaced almost vertically, exposing her whole conning tower, her hull forward of the tower, and part of her keel. Then the bow dropped about 10 degrees, and the submarine sank rapidly by the stern. Though absolute confirmation of a kill was never received, all evidence strongly indicated that the submarine had indeed sunk. Combinedfleet.com states that "Although USS Southard (DMS-10) is often credited with I-172′s sinking, her target was more likely I-15.

On 27 November 1942, the Imperial Japanese Navy declared that I-172 was presumed lost off Guadalcanal along with all 91 men on board. She was struck from the Navy List 15 December 1942.
