= Japanese submarine I-178 =

1st class submarine of the Imperial Japanese Navy

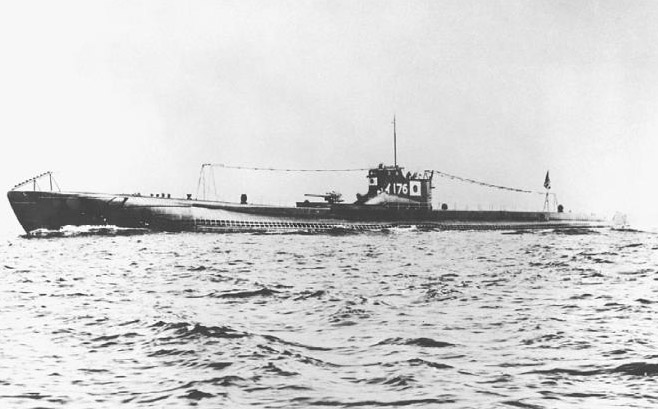
- I-176, lead submarine of the class that includes I-178

History

Empire of Japan
- Name: I-178
- Ordered: 1939
- Builder: Kure Naval Arsenal
- Laid down: May 21, 1941
- Launched: February 24, 1942
- Commissioned: December 26, 1942
- In service: 1942–43
- Fate: Missing after June 17, 1943

General characteristics
- Class & type: Kaidai type, KD7-class
- Displacement: 1,833 long tons (1,862 t) surfaced; 2,602 long tons (2,644 t) submerged
- Length: 105.5 m (346 ft)
- Beam: 8.25 m (27.1 ft)
- Draft: 4.6 m (15 ft)
- Propulsion: 2 × Kampon Mk.1B Model 8 diesels, 2 shafts; 8,000 bhp; Electric motors: 1,800 shp
- Speed: 23.1 knots (42.8 km/h; 26.6 mph) surfaced; 8 knots (15 km/h; 9.2 mph) submerged
- Range: 8,000 nmi (15,000 km; 9,200 mi) at 16 knots (30 km/h; 18 mph) surfaced; 50 nmi (93 km; 58 mi) at 5 knots (9.3 km/h; 5.8 mph) submerged
- Test depth: 80 m (260 ft)
- Complement: 86
- Armament: 6 × 533 mm forward torpedo tubes; 12 × Type 95 torpedoes; 1 × 120 mm (4.7 in) 11th Year Type Naval gun; 2 × Type 96 25mm AA guns

Japanese Submarine I-178 (I-78, until May 20, 1942) was a Kaidai-type cruiser submarine that saw service during World War II in the Imperial Japanese Navy. Commissioned on December 26, 1942, I-178 was a KD7 sub-class boat that sailed on just two patrols off the east coast of Australia during 1943, going missing sometime after June 17, 1943.

== Design and construction ==
The KD7-type Kaidais was 346 feet (105 m) long and displaced 1,833 long tons (1,862 t) when surfaced. The diesel-electric propulsion system provided a maximum speed of 23 knots (43 km/h; 26 mph) when surfaced or 8 knots (15 km/h; 9.2 mph) submerged. The boats could operate for 75 days before resupply. Armaments consisted of six forward-facing torpedo tubes firing Long Lance torpedoes, of which she could carry fourteen, a 4.7-inch deck gun, and a 25-millimetre anti-aircraft gun.

The submarine was built at the Mitsubishi Yard. She was completed in 1942.

== Operational history ==
Assigned to Submarine Squadron Three of the Sixth Fleet, I-178 sailed from Japan on March 30, 1943, and reached Truk on April 7. Three days later, the submarine left to patrol the eastern coast of Australia, supporting sister boat I-177. At 18:45 on April 27, 1943, the submarine torpedoed the Liberty ship Lydia M. Child, 90 miles off the coast of Newcastle, New South Wales. There were allegedly no casualties among the freighter's 62 crew, who were all rescued the next day. I-178 escaped despite multiple attempted bombing runs by a Catalina from No. 11 Squadron RAAF.

She returned to Truk on May 18, but was ordered to sail again two days later, returning to the Australian coast. The patrol was initially uneventful, but after sending a routine radio signal on June 17, I-178 was never heard from again.

== Fate ==
On August 4, 1943, the submarine was declared lost with all hands. She was struck from the Navy List on September 1.

Claims for sinking the submarine vary, with different sources identifying the responsible party as the U.S. Navy submarine chasers SC-669 or SC-699 off Espírito Santo on May 29, 1943 (this claim is discounted, as I-178 was still in radio contact until June 17), three Bristol Beauforts of No. 32 Squadron RAAF off Coffs Harbour, New South Wales on June 17 (the claim is reasonably strong), or the destroyer USS Patterson near the Solomon Islands on August 25, 1943.
