= Kaidai-type submarine =

Type of first-class submarine operated by the Imperial Japanese Navy

Class overview
- Name: Kaidai-type submarine
- Builders: Kure Naval Arsenal; Sasebo Naval Arsenal; Yokosuka Naval Arsenal; Kawasaki Shipbuilding; Mitsubishi Heavy Industries
- Operators: Imperial Japanese Navy
- Preceded by: Kaichū Type
- Succeeded by: Junsen Type
- Subclasses: Kaidai I (I-51-class); Kaidai II (I-152-class); Kaidai IIIa (I-153-class); Kaidai IIIb (I-156-class); Kaidai IV (I-61/I-162-class); Kaidai V (I-165-class); Kaidai VIa (I-168-class); Kaidai VIb (I-174-class); Kaidai VII (I-176-class)
- Built: 1921–1943
- In commission: 1924–1945

The Kaidai-type submarine (海大型潜水艦, Kaidai-gata sensuikan) was a type of fleet submarine operated by the Imperial Japanese Navy (IJN) before and during World War II. The type name was shortened to Kaigun-shiki Ōgata Sensuikan (海軍式大型潜水艦) Navy Large Type Submarine.

All Kaidai-class submarines originally had a two-digit boat name, from I-51 onwards. On 20 May 1942, all Kaidai submarines added a '1' to their names. For example, I-52 became I-152. Ships are listed by the three-digit boat name if they had one, two-digit if they were not granted one or left service before 20 May 1942.

== Class variants ==
The Kaidai-type submarines were divided into seven classes and two subclasses:

- Kaidai I (海大1型（伊五十一型）, Kaidai-ichi-gata, I-51-class)
- Kaidai II (海大2型（伊五十二型/伊百五十二型）, Kaidai-ni-gata, I-52/I-152-class)
- Kaidai IIIa (海大3型a（伊五十三型/伊百五十三型）, Kaidai-san-gata-ē, I-53/I-153-class)
- Kaidai IIIb (海大3型b（伊五十六型/伊百五十六型）, Kaidai-san-gata-bī, I-56/I-156-class)
- Kaidai IV (海大4型（伊六十一型/伊百六十二型）, Kaidai-yon-gata, I-61/I-162-class)
- Kaidai V (海大5型（伊六十五型/伊百六十五型）, Kaidai-go-gata, I-65/I-165-class)
- Kaidai VIa (海大6型a（伊六十八型/伊百六十八型）, Kaidai-roku-gata-ē, I-68/I-168-class)
- Kaidai VIb (海大6型b（伊七十四型/伊百七十四型）, Kaidai-roku-gata-bī, I-74/I-174-class)
- Kaidai VII (海大7型（伊七十六型/伊百七十六型）, Kaidai-nana-gata, I-76/I-176-class)

=== Kaidai I (I-51 class) ===
I-51 in June 1924

Project number S22. The prototype for the class. The sole Kaidai I, I-51, was based on World War I-era German submarines. She was completed in 1924, refitted with new engines in 1932 and scrapped in 1941. I-51 never saw combat.

- Boat in class

Boat	Builder	Laid down	Launched	Completed	Fate
I-51 (ex-Submarine No. 44)	Kure Naval Arsenal	6 April 1921	29 November 1921	20 June 1924 as Submarine No. 44	Renamed I-51 on 1 November 1924. Decommissioned on 1 April 1940

=== Kaidai II (I-152 class) ===
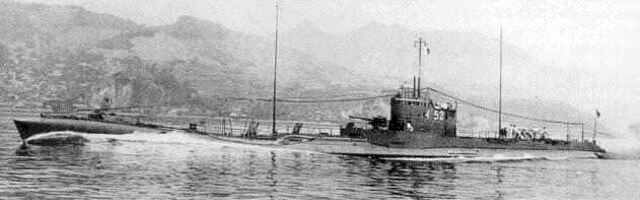
I-152

Project number S25. There was only 1 Kaidai II, I-152 planned under the Eight-six fleet together with the I-51. She was completed in 1924, used as a training vessel until mid-1942, then struck from service. She was scrapped in 1946.

- Boat in class

Boat	Builder	Laid down	Launched	Completed	Fate
I-152 (ex-I-52) (ex-Submarine No. 51)	Kure Naval Arsenal	14 February 1922 as Submarine No. 51	12 June 1923	20 May 1925 as I-52	Renamed I-52 on 1 November 1924, decommissioned on 1 August 1942, scrapped post-war
Submarine No. 64	Kure Naval Arsenal				Re-planned as Kaidai IIIa

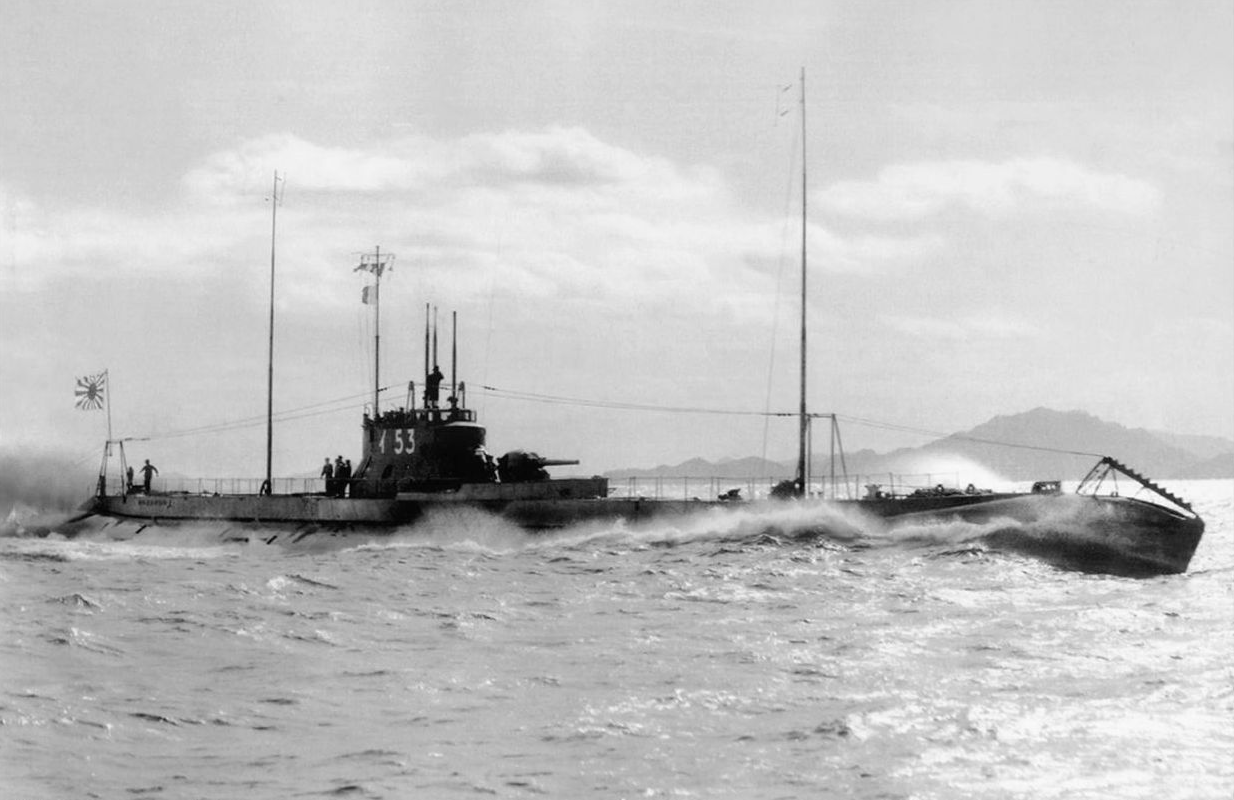
I-153 on 15 March 1927

=== Kaidai IIIa/b (I-153 class and I-156 class) ===
Project number S26 (Kaidai IIIa) and S27 (Kaidai IIIb). The nine Kaidai IIIs were based on earlier designs, but featured a strengthened hull. The "IIIb" types were 40 cm longer and had a different bow design. All nine boats were constructed between 1927 and 1930.

Of the nine Kaidai IIIs, seven survived the war, as they spent much of their time as training vessels. These were scuttled or scrapped shortly after the end of World War II. I-63 was sunk in a collision with I-60 in 1939, the former losing all her crew. I-63 was refloated and scrapped in 1940. I-60 was later sunk by HMS Jupiter.

Kaidai IIIa/b
Boat	Sub type	Builder	Laid down	Launched	Completed	Results	Fate
I-153 (ex-I-53) (ex-Submarine No. 64)	Kaidai IIIa	Kure Naval Arsenal	1 April 1924 as Submarine No. 64	5 August 1925 as I-53	30 March 1927	Renamed I-53 on 1 November 1924. Sank Dutch merchant ship Mösi on 27 February 1942; Sank RMS City of Manchester on 28 February 1942; Sank unknown merchant vessel on 27 February 1942	Decommissioned on 20 November 1945, scrapped in 1948
I-154 (ex-I-54) (ex-Submarine No. 77)	Kaidai IIIa	Sasebo Naval Arsenal	15 November 1924 as I-54	15 March 1926	15 December 1927	Sank Dutch merchant ship Majokaat on 2 March 1942	Decommissioned on 20 November 1945, disposed of at Iyo-nada in May 1946
I-155 (ex-I-55) (ex-Submarine No. 78)	Kaidai IIIa	Kure Naval Arsenal	1 April 1924 as I-55	2 September 1925	5 September 1927	Sank Dutch merchant-man Van Lansberge on 4 February 1942; Sank Dutch merchant ship Van Cloon on 7 February 1942; Sank RMS Derrymore on 14 February 1942; Sank Norwegian merchant vessel Madrono on 18 February 1942	Decommissioned on 20 November 1945, disposed of at Iyo-nada in May 1946
I-156 (ex-I-56)	Kaidai IIIb	Kure Naval Arsenal	3 November 1926	23 March 1928	31 March 1929	Sank Greek merchant ship Hydra II or Norwegian merchant ship Hai Tung on 11 December 1941; Sank RMS Kuantan on 5 January 1942; Damaged Dutch merchant ship Tanimbar on 6 January 1942; Sank Dutch merchantman Van Rees on 8 January 1942; Sank Dutch merchant ship Van Riebeeck on 8 January 1942; Damaged Dutch merchant ship Patras on 13 January 1942; Sank Dutch merchant ship Togian on 4 February 1942	Decommissioned 30 November 1945, sunk as a target off the Gotō Islands on 1 April 1946
I-157 (ex-I-57)	Kaidai IIIb	Kure Naval Arsenal	8 July 1927	1 October 1928	24 December 1929	Sank Dutch merchant ship Djirak on 7 January 1942	Decommissioned 30 November 1945, sunk as a target off the Gotō Islands on 1 April 1946
I-158 (ex-I-58)	Kaidai IIIa	Yokosuka Naval Arsenal	3 December 1924	3 October 1925	15 May 1928	Sank Dutch merchant ship Langkoas on 3 January 1942; Sank Dutch merchant ship Camphuys on 9 January 1942; Sank Dutch merchant vessel Pijnacker Hordijk on 22 February 1942; Sank Dutch merchant ship Boeroe on 25 February 1942 torpedoed but did not sink RMS British Judge on 28 February 1942	Decommissioned on 30 November 1945, sunk as a target off the Gotō Islands on 1 April 1946
I-159 (ex-I-59)	Kaidai IIIb	Yokosuka Naval Arsenal	25 March 1927	25 March 1929	31 March 1930	Sank Norwegian merchant ship Eidsvold on 20 January 1942; Sank unknown merchantman 25 January 1942; Sank Dutch merchant ship SS Rooseboom on 1 March 1942	Decommissioned on 30 November 1945, sunk as a target off the Gotō Islands on 1 April 1946
I-60	Kaidai IIIb	Sasebo Naval Arsenal	10 October 1927	24 April 1929	20 December 1929		Sunk by HMS Jupiter in the Sunda Strait 06°00′S 105°00′E on 17 January 1942
I-63	Kaidai IIIb	Sasebo Naval Arsenal	12 August 1926	28 September 1927	20 December 1928		Accidentally rammed by I-60 in the Bungo Channel on 20 February 1939. Salvaged and scrapped on 21 January 1940

=== Kaidai IV (I-61/162 class) ===
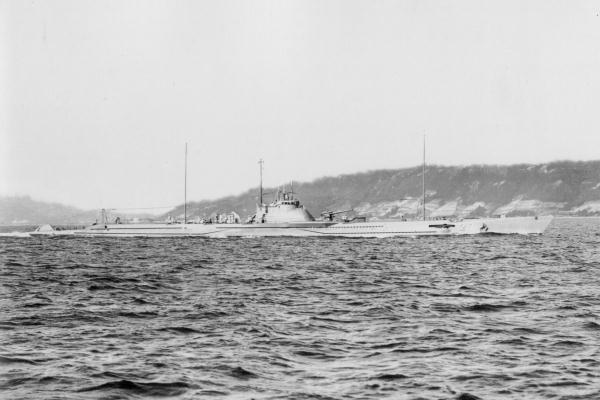
I-164 in 1930

Project number S28. Slightly smaller than her predecessors and with only four torpedo tubes, three Kaidai IVs were constructed between 1929 and 1930; I-61, I-162, and I-164. I-61 was lost in a collision in 1941. I-164 was sunk by USS Triton on 17 May 1942. I-162 survived the war.

Boats in Kaidai IV class
Boat	Builder	Laid down; Launched; Completed	Results	Fate
I-61	Mitsubishi, Kōbe Shipyard	15 November 1926; 12 November 1927; 6 April 1929		Lost in an accident on 2 October 1941 in the Iki Channel. Raised and scrapped in 1942
I-162 (ex-I-62)	Mitsubishi, Kōbe Shipyard	20 April 1927; 29 November 1928; 24 March 1930	• Damaged RMS Longwood 31 January 1942 • Damaged RMS Spondilus on 4 February 1942 • Sank RMS Lakshmi Govinda on 10 March 1942 • Sank Dutch merchant ship Merkus on 16 March 1942 • Damaged RMS San Cirilo on 21 March 1942 • Sank unknown merchant ship on 22 March 1942 • Sank Soviet merchant ship Mikoyan on 3 October 1942 • Sank RMS Manon on 7 October 1942 • Damaged RMS Martaban on 13 October 1942 • Sank RMS Fort McCloud on 3 March 1944	Decommissioned 30 November 1945, sunk as a target off the Gotō Islands on 1 April 1946
I-164 (ex-I-64)	Kure Naval Arsenal	28 March 1928; 5 October 1929; 30 August 1930	• Sank Dutch merchant vessel Van Overstraten on 22 January 1942 • Damaged RMS Idar on 28 January 1942 • Sank SS Florence Luckenbach on 29 January 1942 • Sank Indian merchant ship Jalatarang on 30 January 1942 • Sank Indian merchant ship Jalapalaka on 31 January 1942 • Sank Norwegian merchant ship Mabella on 13 March 1942	Sunk by USS Triton south of Kyūshū 29°25′N 134°09′E on 17 May 1942

=== Kaidai V (I-165 class) ===
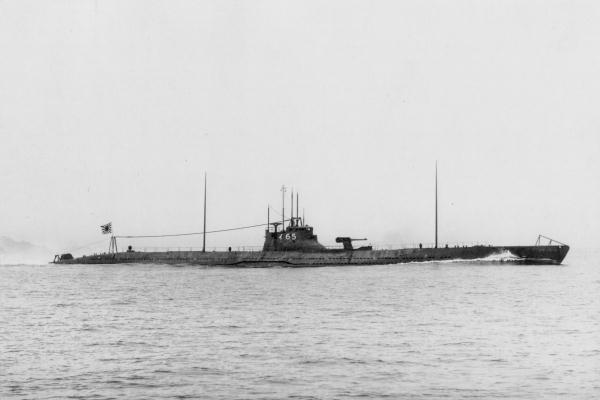
- I-65 in 1932

Class overview
- Built: 1929–1932
- In commission: 1932–1945
- Completed: 3
- Lost: 3

General characteristics
- Displacement: 1,575 long tons (1,600 t) surfaced; 2,330 long tons (2,367 t) submerged
- Length: 97.70 m (320 ft 6 in)
- Beam: 8.20 m (26 ft 11 in)
- Draught: 4.70 m (15 ft 5 in)
- Propulsion: 2 × Sulzer Mk.3 diesels 2 shafts 6,000 bhp; 1,800 shp
- Speed: 20.5 knots (38.0 km/h; 23.6 mph) surfaced; 8.2 knots (15.2 km/h; 9.4 mph) submerged
- Range: 10,000 nmi (19,000 km) at 10 kn (19 km/h) surfaced; 60 nmi (110 km) at 3 kn (5.6 km/h) submerged
- Test depth: 75 m (246 ft)
- Complement: 60
- Armament: 6 × 533 mm (21 in) torpedo tubes (4 × bow, 2 × stern); 16 × Type 89 torpedo; 1 × 100 mm (3.9 in) or 120 mm (4.7 in); 1 × 12.7 mm AA gun; 1 × 7.7 mm MG

Project number S29. Three Kaidai Vs were constructed; I-165, I-166, and I-67 which were all completed in 1932. The design saw the upgrade of the deck weapon from a 50 caliber to a 65-caliber long dual-purpose gun. The submarine was also slightly wider and taller, with an increased crew complement of 75 and an increased maximum depth of 230 ft (70 m). I-165 was modified in 1945, her gun removed and two Kaiten manned torpedo suicide attack craft substituted.

None of the Kaidai Vs survived World War II. I-67 was lost with all 87 crew during an exercise in 1940. I-165 was sunk on 27 June 1945, off the east coast of Saipan. I-166 was sunk by the British submarine HMS Telemachus on 17 July 1944, off the coast of Singapore.

Boat	Builder	Laid down	Launched	Completed	Results	Fate
I-165 (ex-I-65)	Kure Naval Arsenal	19 December 1929	2 June 1931	1 December 1932	• Sank Dutch merchant ship Benkoelen on 9 January 1942 • Sank Indian merchant ship Jalarajan on 15 January 1942 • Sank Netherlands merchant Johanne Justesen on 15 February 1942 • Sank RMS Bhima on 20 February 1942 • Sank SS Harmonides on 25 August 1942 • Sank SS Losmar on 24 September 1942 • Sank RMS Perseus on 16 January 1944 • Sank SS Nancy Moller on 18 March 1944	Converted to a Kaiten mothership in 1945, sunk by USN patrol bomber in the Mariana Islands 15°28′N 153°39′E on 27 June 1945
I-166 (ex-I-66)	Sasebo Naval Arsenal	8 November 1929	2 June 1931	10 November 1932	• Sank Dutch submarine HNLMS K XVI on 25 December 1941 • Sank US cargo ship USAT Liberty on 11 January 1942 • Sank Panamanian merchantman Nord 21 January 1942 • Sank RMS Chak Sang on 22 January 1942 • Sank RMS Kamuning 14 February 1942 • Sank Panamanian merchantman Camila on 1 October 1942 • Sank RMS Cranfield on 22 November 1942	Sunk by HMS Telemachus on 17 July 1944
I-67	Mitsubishi, Kōbe Shipyard	8 November 1929	2 June 1931	10 November 1932		Lost in an accident at Minami Torishima on 29 August 1940

=== Kaidai VIa/b (I-168 class and I-174 class) ===
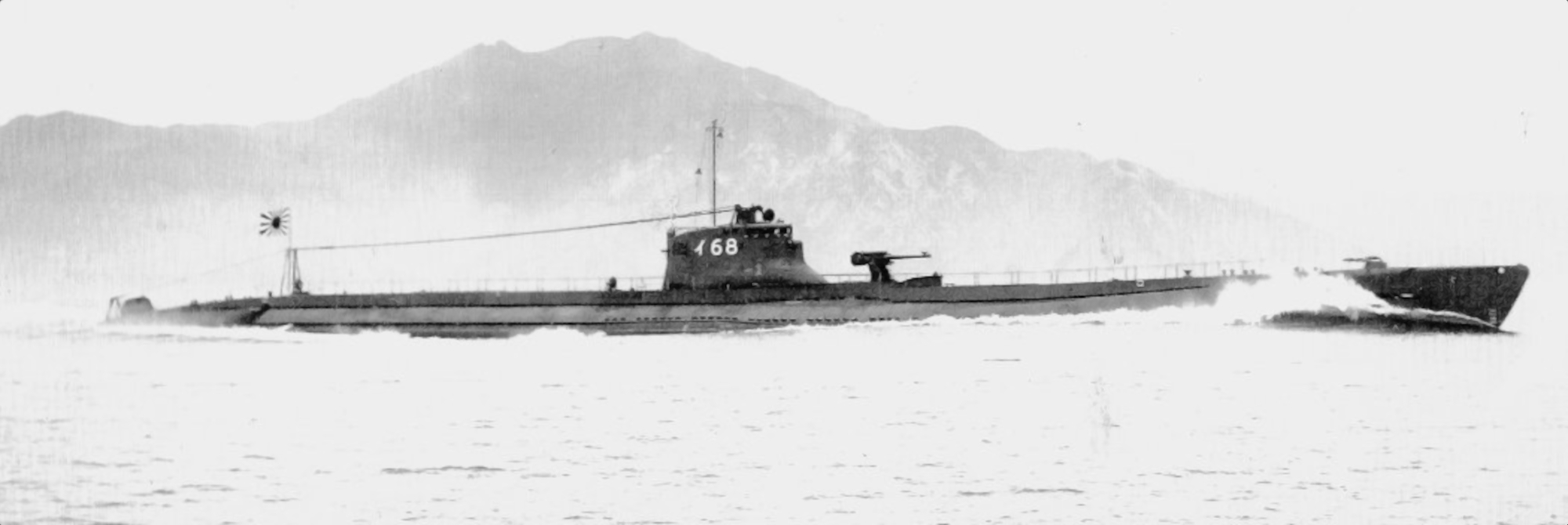
I-68/I-168 in 1934

Project number S31 (Kaidai VIa) and S34 (Kaidai VIb). They were built in 1931-34 under the 1st Naval Armaments Supplement Programme (Maru 1) and the 2nd Naval Armaments Supplement Programme (Maru 2) for the expansion of the Japanese navy. Constructed between 1934 and 1938, eight Kaidai VIs were built; I-168, I-169, I-70, I-171, I-172, I-73, I-174, and I-175. At 23 knots, this type had the fastest surface speed for any submarine at the time of construction, although the speed was bettered slightly by later Japanese submarines. I-174 and I-175 were of the Kaidai VIb sub-type. They were 30 cm longer, 25 tons heavier, and equipped with a 50 cal deck weapon instead of a 65 cal.

Kaidai VIs contributed to the sinking of two American aircraft carriers during World War II. The destruction of these submarines also hold some milestones; I-70 was Japan's first major warship casualty in World War II, and the sinking of I-73 represented the first warship kill by a United States Navy submarine in the war.

- Boats in classes

Boat	Sub type	'Builder	Laid down	Launched	Completed	Results	Fate
I-168 (ex-I-68)	Kaidai VIa (Earlier batch)	Kure Naval Arsenal	18 June 1931	26 June 1933	31 July 1934	Sank USS Hammann on 6 June 1942; Sank USS Yorktown on 7 June 1942	Sunk by USS Scamp at north of Rabaul 27 July 1943
I-169 (ex-I-69)	Kaidai VIa (Earlier batch)	Mitsubishi, Kōbe Shipyard	22 December 1932	15 February 1934	28 September 1935	Sank Dutch merchantman Tjinegara 21 July 1942	Sunk by air raid at Truk on 4 April 1944
I-70	Kaidai VIa (Earlier batch)	Sasebo Naval Arsenal	25 January 1933	14 June 1934	9 November 1935		Sunk by aircraft from USS Enterprise in the Hawaiian Islands on 10 December 1941
I-171 (ex-I-71)	Kaidai VIa (Latter batch)	Kawasaki, Kōbe Shipyard	15 February 1933	25 August 1934	24 December 1935	Sank USS General Royal T. Frank on 19 January 1942	Sunk by USS Guest and USS Hudson west of Buka Island on 30 January 1944
I-172 (ex-I-72)	Kaidai VIa (Latter batch)	Mitsubishi, Kōbe Shipyard	16 December 1933	6 April 1935	7 January 1937	Sank USS Prusa on 19 December 1941; Sank the oiler USS Neches on 23 January 1942	Sunk by USS Southard at San Cristobal 10 November 1942
I-73	Kaidai VIa (Latter batch)	Kawasaki, Kōbe Shipyard	5 September 1933	20 June 1935	7 January 1937		(1). Sunk by USS Gudgeon at Midway Atoll 28°24′N 178°35′E on 27 January 1942
I-174 (ex-I-74)	Kaidai VIb	Sasebo Naval Arsenal	16 October 1934	28 March 1937	15 August 1938	Sank US Army transport Portmar on 16 June 1943 and damaged USS LST-469 in an attack on Convoy GP55 on 16 June 1943	Sunk by a United States Navy B-24 Liberator patrol aircraft near Truk on 12 April 1944
I-175 (ex-I-75)	Kaidai VIb	Mitsubishi, Kōbe Shipyard	1 November 1934	16 September 1936	18 December 1938	Sank USS Manini 18 December 1941; Damaged Australian merchant ship Allara on 23 July 1942; Sank Australian merchant ship Murada on 24 July 1942; Sank French merchant vessel Cagou on 28 July 1942; Sank RMS Dranker on 3 August 1942; Sank USS Liscome Bay on 24 November 1943	Sunk by USS Nicholas northeast of Wotje Atoll on 17 February 1944

=== Kaidai VII (I-176 class) ===
- I-176 on sea trials, 31 July 1942

Class overview
- Built: 1939–1943
- In commission: 1942–1944
- Planned: 10
- Lost: 10

General characteristics
- Displacement: 1,630 long tons (1,656 t) surfaced; 2,602 long tons (2,644 t) submerged
- Length: 105.50 m (346 ft 2 in)
- Beam: 8.25 m (27 ft 1 in)
- Draft: 4.60 m (15 ft 1 in)
- Propulsion: 2 × Kampon Mk 1B Model 8 diesels, 2 shafts, 8,000 bhp; 1,800 shp
- Speed: 23.1 kn (42.8 km/h) surfaced; 8.0 kn (14.8 km/h) submerged
- Range: 8,000 nmi (15,000 km) at 16 kn (30 km/h) surfaced; 50 nmi (93 km) at 5 kn (9.3 km/h) submerged
- Test depth: 80 m (260 ft)
- Complement: 86
- Armament: 6 × 533 mm (21 in) TTs; (6 × bow); 12 × Type 95 torpedoes; 1 × 120 mm (4.7 in) L/40 11th Year Type Naval gun; 2 × Type 96 25mm AA guns
- Notes: 354.7 tons fuel

Project number S41. The final design in the Kaidai class, ten Kaidai VIIs were ordered in 1939 (I-176 I-185), and were completed over the course of 1942 and 1943. They were built in 1939 under the Maru 4 Programme. The IJN called New Kaidai (新海大型, Shin Kaidai-gata) unofficially, and intended to replace this type with Kaidai III and Kaidai IV. Instead of possessing some aft-firing torpedo tubes as all other predecessors did, the Kaidai VII's six tubes all faced forward. They had an endurance of 75 days.

Seven of the ten Kaidai VIIs were sunk within their first year of operation and all ten vessels were sunk by October 1944.

- Boats in class

Boat No.	Boat	Builder	Laid down	Launched	Completed	Results	Fate
154	I-176 (ex-I-76)	Kure Naval Arsenal	22 June 1940 as I-76	7 June 1941	4 August 1942 as I-176	Damaged USS Chester on 20 October 1942; Sank USS Corvina on 17 November 1943	Sunk by USS Franks and USS Haggard northwest of Buka Island on 17 May 1944.
155	I-177 (ex-I-77)	Kawasaki, Kōbe Shipyard	10 March 1941 as I-77	20 December 1941	28 December 1942 as I-177	Sank RMS Limerick on 26 April 1943; Sank AHS Centaur on 14 May 1943	Sunk by USS Steele and USS Samuel S. Miles northwest of Palau on 3 October 1944
156	I-178 (ex-I-78)	Mitsubishi, Kōbe Shipyard	21 May 1941 as I-78	24 February 1942	26 December 1942 as I-178	Sank Liberty ship Lydia M. Child on 27 April 1943	Missing after 17 June 1943 during a patrol off eastern Australia. Cause of loss not known, but some sources attribute it to Royal Australian Air Force aircraft.
157	I-179 (ex-I-79)	Kawasaki, Kōbe Shipyard	21 August 1941 as I-79	16 July 1942 as I-179	8 June 1943		Sank during sea trials at Iyo Nada on 9 July 1943. Salvaged April 1956 to 1 March 1957 and scrapped at Kure.
158	I-180 (ex-I-80)	Yokosuka Naval Arsenal	17 April 1941 as I-80	7 February 1942 as I-180	15 January 1943	Sank Australian merchant ship Wollongbar on 29 April 1943; Sank Norwegian merchant ship SS Fingal 5 May 1943; Damaged Australian merchant vessel Ormiston on 12 May 1943; Damaged Australian merchantman Caradale on 12 May 1943	Sunk by USS Gilmore at Dutch Harbor 55°10′N 155°40′W on 27 April 1944
159	I-181	Kure Naval Arsenal	11 November 1941	2 May 1942	25 May 1943		Sunk by USN destroyer and patrol torpedo boat in New Guinea on 16 January 1944
160	I-182	Yokosuka Naval Arsenal	10 November 1941	20 May 1942	10 May 1943		(1). Sunk by USS Wadsworth at Espiritu Santo on 1 September 1943
161	I-183	Kawasaki, Kōbe Shipyard	26 December 1941	21 January 1943	3 October 1943		Sunk by USS Pogy south of Shikoku on 28 April 1944
162	I-184	Yokosuka Naval Arsenal	1 April 1942	12 December 1942	15 October 1943		Sunk by aircraft from USS Suwannee southeast of Saipan on 19 June 1944
163	I-185	Yokosuka Naval Arsenal	9 February 1942	16 September 1942	23 September 1943		Sunk by USS Newcomb and USS Chandler northwest of Saipan on 22 June 1944

== Characteristics ==
Type		'Kaidai I (I-51)	'Kaidai II (I-152)	Kaidai IIIa (I-153)	Kaidai IIIb(I-156)	Kaidai IV (I-61)
Displacement	Surfaced	1,390 long tons (1,412 t)	1,390 long tons (1,412 t)	1,635 long tons (1,661 t)	1,635 long tons (1,661 t)	1,575 long tons (1,600 t)
Displacement	Submerged	2,430 long tons (2,469 t)	2,500 long tons (2,540 t)	2,300 long tons (2,337 t)	2,300 long tons (2,337 t)	2,300 long tons (2,337 t)
Length (overall)		91.44 m (300 ft 0 in)	100.85 m (330 ft 10 in)	100.58 m (330 ft 0 in)	101.00 m (331 ft 4 in)	97.70 m (320 ft 6 in)
Beam		8.81 m (28 ft 11 in)	7.64 m (25 ft 1 in)	7.98 m (26 ft 2 in)	7.90 m (25 ft 11 in)	7.80 m (25 ft 7 in)
Draft		4.60 m (15 ft 1 in)	5.14 m (16 ft 10 in)	4.83 m (15 ft 10 in)	4.90 m (16 ft 1 in)	4.83 m (15 ft 10 in)
Depth		6.02 m (19 ft 9 in)	6.71 m (22 ft 0 in)	6.71 m (22 ft 0 in)	6.70 m (22 ft 0 in)	6.70 m (22 ft 0 in)
Propulsion		4 × Sulzer Mk.2 diesels 4 shafts	2 × Sulzer Mk 3 diesels 2 shafts	2 × Sulzer Mk 3 diesels 2 shafts	2 × Sulzer Mk 3 diesels 2 shafts	2 × Rauschenbach Mk 2 diesels 2 shafts
Power	Surfaced	5,200 bhp	6,800 bhp	6,800 bhp	6,800 bhp	6,000 bhp
Power	Submerged	2,000 shp	1,800 shp	1,800 shp	1,800 shp	1,800 shp
Speed	Surfaced	18.4 knots (34.1 km/h)	20.1 knots (37.2 km/h)	20.0 knots (37.0 km/h)	20.0 knots (37.0 km/h)	20.0 knots (37.0 km/h)
Speed	Submerged	8.4 knots (15.6 km/h)	7.7 knots (14.3 km/h)	8.0 knots (14.8 km/h)	8.0 knots (14.8 km/h)	8.5 knots (15.7 km/h)
Range	Surfaced	20,000 nmi (37,000 km) at 10 knots (19 km/h)	10,000 nmi (19,000 km) at 10 knots (19 km/h)	10,000 nmi (19,000 km) at 10 knots (19 km/h)	10,000 nmi (19,000 km) at 10 knots (19 km/h)	10,000 nmi (19,000 km) at 10 knots (19 km/h)
Range	Submerged	100 nmi (190 km) at 4 knots (7.4 km/h)	100 nmi (190 km) at 4 knots (7.4 km/h)	90 nmi (170 km) at 3 knots (5.6 km/h)	60 nmi (110 km) at 3 knots (5.6 km/h)	60 nmi (110 km) at 3 knots (5.6 km/h)
Test depth		45.7 m (150 ft)	45.7 m (150 ft)	60.0 m (196.9 ft)	60.0 m (196.9 ft)	60.0 m (196.9 ft)
Fuel		508 tons	284.5 tons	241.8 tons	230 tons	230 tons
Complement		70	58	63	63	58
Armament (initial)		• 8 × 533 mm (21 in) TTs (6 × bow, 2 × aft) • 24 × 6th Year Type torpedoes • 1 × 120 mm (4.7 in) L/45 3rd Year Type Naval gun	• 8 × 533 mm (21 in) TTs (6 × bow, 2 × aft) • 16 × 6th Year Type torpedoes • 1 × 120 mm (4.7 in) L/45 3rd Year Type Naval gun • 1 × 76.2 mm (3.00 in) L/23.5 AA gun	• 8 × 533 mm (21 in) TTs (6 × bow, 2 × aft) • 16 × 6th Year Type torpedoes • 1 × 120 mm (4.7 in) L/40 11th Year Type Naval gun • 1 × 7.7 mm MG	same as Kaidai IIIa	• 6 × 533 mm (21 in) TTs (4 × bow, 2 × aft) • 14 × Type 89 torpedoes • 1 × 120 mm (4.7 in) L/40 11th Year Type Naval gun • 1 × 7.7 mm MG

Type		Kaidai V (I-165)	Kaidai VIa (Earlier batch, I-168)	Kaidai VIa (Latter batch, I-171)	Kaidai VIb (I-174)
Displacement	Surfaced	1,575 long tons (1,600 t)	1,400 long tons (1,422 t)	same as Earlier batch	1,420 long tons (1,443 t)
Displacement	Submerged	2,330 long tons (2,367 t)	2,440 long tons (2,479 t)	same as Earlier batch	2,564 long tons (2,605 t)
Length (overall)		97.70 m (320 ft 6 in)	104.70 m (343 ft 6 in)	same as Earlier batch	105.00 m (344 ft 6 in)
Beam		8.20 m (26 ft 11 in)	8.20 m (26 ft 11 in)	same as Earlier batch	8.20 m (26 ft 11 in)
Draft		4.70 m (15 ft 5 in)	4.58 m (15 ft 0 in)	same as Earlier batch	4.60 m (15 ft 1 in)
Depth		7.05 m (23 ft 2 in)	7.00 m (23 ft 0 in)	same as Earlier batch	7.00 m (23 ft 0 in)
Power plant and shaft		2 × Sulzer Mk.3 diesels 2 shafts	2 × Kampon Mk.1A Model 8 diesels, 2 shafts	same as Earlier batch	2 × Kampon Mk 1A Model 8 diesels, 2 shafts
Power	Surfaced	6,000 bhp	9,000 bhp	same as Earlier batch	9,000 bhp
Power	Submerged	1,800 shp	1,800 shp	same as Earlier batch	1,800 shp
Speed	Surfaced	20.5 knots (38.0 km/h)	23.0 knots (42.6 km/h)	same as Earlier batch	23.0 knots (42.6 km/h)
Speed	Submerged	8.2 knots (15.2 km/h)	8.2 knots (15.2 km/h)	same as Earlier batch	8.2 knots (15.2 km/h)
Range	Surfaced	10,000 nmi (19,000 km) at 10 knots (19 km/h)	14,000 nmi (26,000 km) at 10 knots (19 km/h)	same as Earlier batch	10,000 nmi (19,000 km) at 16 knots (30 km/h)
Range	Submerged	60 nmi (110 km) at 3 knots (5.6 km/h)	65 nmi (120 km) at 3 knots (5.6 km/h)	same as Earlier batch	90 nmi (170 km) at 3 knots (5.6 km/h)
Test depth		75.0 m (246.1 ft)	70.0 m (229.7 ft)	same as Earlier batch	85.0 m (278.9 ft)
Fuel		230 tons	341 tons	same as Earlier batch	442 tons
Complement		62	68	same as Earlier batch	68
Armament(initial)		• 6 × 533 mm (21 in) TTs (4 × bow, 2 × aft) • 14 × Type 89 torpedoes • 1 × 100 mm (3.9 in) L/50 Type 88 AA gun • 1 × 12.7 mm AA gun • 1 × 7.7 mm MG	• 6 × 533 mm (21 in) TTs (4 × bow, 2 × aft) • 14 × Type 89 torpedoes • 1 × 100 mm (3.9 in) L/50 Type 88 AA gun • 1 × 13.2 mm (0.52 in) AA gun • 1 × 7.7 mm MG	• 6 × 533 mm (21 in) TTs (4 × bow, 2 × aft) • 14 × Type 89 torpedoes • 1 × 120 mm (4.7 in) L/40 11th Year Type Naval gun • 1 × 13.2 mm AA gun • 1 × 7.7 mm MG	• 6 × 533 mm (21 in) TTs (4 × bow, 2 × aft) • 14 × Type 89 torpedoes • 1 × 120 mm (4.7 in) L/40 11th Year Type Naval gun • 1 × 13.2 mm AA gun
