= Kelanoa Harbour =

Harbour on the Huon Peninsula in Papua New Guinea

- Location in Papua New Guinea
- Location: Huon Peninsula, Papua New Guinea
- Coordinates: 6°1′5″S 147°30′12″E
- Type: Harbour

Kelanoa Harbour is a harbour on the north coast of the Huon Peninsula in Papua New Guinea serving the town of Kelanoa. It is a large bay with an impenetrable reef and a small island.

== History ==
During World War II, the United States Navy PT boats PT-151 and PT-192 found a large towed Japanese supply container floating off New Guinea on December 24, 1943, and destroyed it. The wreckage of the container drifted ashore on Gneisenau Point in Kelanoa Harbour, where it was photographed.

The photograph has been widely reproduced and captioned with an assertion that the supply container′s wreckage is the wreck of the Imperial Japanese Navy Kaidai VII-type submarine I-181. In fact, I-181 was depth-charged and sunk in a running battle in the Vitiaz Strait off Gali, New Guinea, by an unidentified U.S. Navy destroyer and PT boat on January 16, 1944, with the loss of all 89 men aboard, and her wreck lies on the sea floor. The Japanese garrison at Gali witnessed the battle and I-181′s destruction in Vitiaz Strait.

Some sources claim U.S. Navy aircraft sank I-181 in St. George's Channel in the Bismarck Archipelago between New Britain and New Ireland on January 16, 1944.
