= I185 =

I-185 may refer to:

- Interstate 185 (Georgia), a spur to Columbus, Georgia
- Interstate 185 (South Carolina), a spur in Greenville, South Carolina
- Japanese submarine I-185
- Polikarpov I-185, a Soviet fighter aircraft
