= Japanese submarine I-179 =

Imperial Japanese Navy's Kaidai type cruiser submarine

- I-179 being refloated off Kure in 1957

History

Empire of Japan
- Name: I-179
- Builder: Kawasaki Dockyard Co., Kobe
- Laid down: 21 August 1941, as Submarine No. 157
- Launched: 16 July 1942
- Completed: 18 June 1943
- Renamed: 1 November 1941, as I-179
- Stricken: 15 April 1944
- Fate: Sunk during sea trials, 14 July 1943; Salvaged and scrapped, 1957

General characteristics
- Class & type: Kaidai type, KD7-class
- Displacement: 1,862 t (1,833 long tons) (surfaced); 2,644 t (2,602 long tons) (submerged)
- Length: 105.5 m (346 ft 2 in)
- Beam: 8.25 m (27 ft 1 in)
- Draft: 4.6 m (15 ft 1 in)
- Installed power: 8,000 bhp (6,000 kW) (diesels); 1,800 hp (1,300 kW) (electric motors)
- Propulsion: Diesel-electric; 2 × diesel engines; 2 × electric motors
- Speed: 23 knots (43 km/h; 26 mph) surfaced; 8 knots (15 km/h; 9.2 mph) submerged
- Range: 8,000 nmi (15,000 km; 9,200 mi) at 16 knots (30 km/h; 18 mph) surfaced; 50 nmi (93 km; 58 mi) at 5 knots (9.3 km/h; 5.8 mph) submerged
- Test depth: 80 m (260 ft)
- Complement: 86
- Armament: 6 × 533 mm (21 in) torpedo tubes (all bow); 1 × 120 mm (4.7 in) deck gun; 1 × twin 25 mm (1.0 in) Type 96 AA gun

The Japanese submarine I-179 (originally I-79) was a Kaidai type cruiser submarine of the KD7 sub-class built for the Imperial Japanese Navy (IJN) during the 1940s. She was lost with all hands when a valve was accidentally left open during her sea trials in July 1943. Her wreck was later salvaged and scrapped in 1957.

== Design and description ==
The submarines of the KD7 sub-class were medium-range attack submarines developed from the preceding KD6 sub-class. They displaced 1,862 metric tons (1,833 long tons) surfaced and 2,644 metric tons (2,602 long tons) submerged. The submarines were 105.5 meters (346 ft 2 in) long, had a beam of 8.25 meters (27 ft 1 in) and a draft of 4.6 meters (15 ft 1 in). The boats had a diving depth of 80 m (260 ft) and a complement of 86 officers and crewmen.

For surface running, the boats were powered by two 4,000-brake-horsepower (2,983 kW) diesel engines, each driving one propeller shaft. When submerged each propeller was driven by a 900-horsepower (671 kW) electric motor. They could reach 23 knots (43 km/h; 26 mph) on the surface and 8 knots (15 km/h; 9.2 mph) underwater. On the surface, the KD7s had a range of 8,000 nautical miles (15,000 km; 9,200 mi) at 16 knots (30 km/h; 18 mph); submerged, they had a range of 50 nmi (93 km; 58 mi) at 5 knots (9.3 km/h; 5.8 mph).

The boats were armed with six internal 53.3 cm (21.0 in) torpedo tubes, all in the bow. They carried one reload for each tube; a total of a dozen torpedoes. They were originally intended to be armed with two twin-gun mounts for the 25 mm (1.0 in) Type 96 anti-aircraft gun, but a 120 mm (4.7 in) deck gun for combat on the surface was substituted for one 25 mm mount during construction.

== Construction and career ==
Built by the Kawasaki Dockyard Co. at their shipyard in Kobe, I-179 was laid down on 21 August 1941 under the name of Submarine No. 157 and renamed I-179 on 1 November 1941. The boat was launched on 16 July 1942 and completed on 18 June 1943. While conducting her sea trials in the Inland Sea on 14 July, she sank with the loss of all 85 officers and crewmen. Her wreck was located four days later at a depth of 81 meters (265 ft) at 32°29′N 131°54′E with several hatches and her bow buoyancy tank vent valve open. I-179 was struck from the Navy List on 15 April 1944. Her wreck was salvaged from April 1956 to 1 March 1957 and scrapped at Kure.
