= Japanese submarine I-181 =

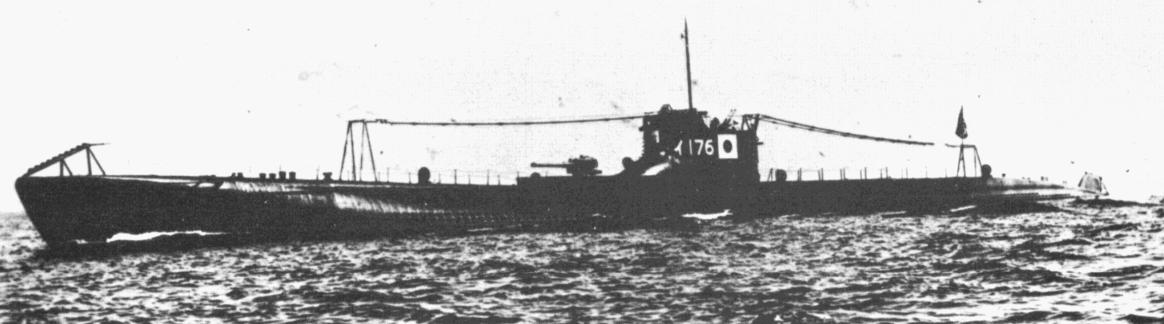
- Sister ship I-176 at sea in 1942

History

Empire of Japan
- Name: Submarine No. 159
- Builder: Kure Naval Arsenal, Kure, Japan
- Laid down: 11 November 1941
- Renamed: I-81
- Launched: 2 May 1942
- Renamed: I-181 on 20 May 1942
- Completed: 24 May 1943
- Fate: Missing after 13 January 1944
- Stricken: 30 April 1944

General characteristics
- Class & type: Kaidai type, KD7-class
- Displacement: 1,862 t (1,833 long tons) surfaced; 2,644 t (2,602 long tons) submerged
- Length: 105.5 m (346 ft 2 in)
- Beam: 8.25 m (27 ft 1 in)
- Draft: 4.6 m (15 ft 1 in)
- Installed power: 8,000 bhp (5,966 kW) (diesels); 1,800 hp (1,342 kW) (electric motors)
- Propulsion: Diesel-electric; 2 × diesel engines; 2 × electric motors
- Speed: 23 knots (43 km/h; 26 mph) surfaced; 8 knots (15 km/h; 9.2 mph) submerged
- Range: 8,000 nmi (15,000 km; 9,200 mi) at 16 knots (30 km/h; 18 mph) surfaced; 50 nmi (93 km; 58 mi) at 5 knots (9.3 km/h; 5.8 mph) submerged
- Test depth: 80 m (262 ft)
- Complement: 86
- Armament: 6 × 533 mm (21 in) torpedo tubes (all bow); 1 × 120 mm (4.7 in) deck gun; 1 × twin 25 mm (1.0 in) Type 96 AA gun

I-181 (originally I-81) was an Imperial Japanese Navy Kaidai-type cruiser submarine of the KD7 sub-class commissioned in 1943. During World War II, she conducted two war patrols, rescued the United States Marine Corps ace Gregory "Pappy" Boyington, and took part in the New Guinea campaign before American warships sank her in January 1944.

== Design and description ==
The submarines of the KD7 sub-class were medium-range attack submarines developed from the preceding KD6 sub-class. They displaced 1,862 metric tons (1,833 long tons) surfaced and 2,644 metric tons (2,602 long tons) submerged. The submarines were 105.5 meters (346 ft 2 in) long, had a beam of 8.25 meters (27 ft 1 in) and a draft of 4.6 meters (15 ft 1 in). They had a diving depth of 80 m (262 ft) and a complement of 86 officers and crewmen.

For surface running, the submarines were powered by two 4,000-brake-horsepower (2,983 kW) diesel engines, each driving one propeller shaft. When submerged each propeller was driven by a 900-horsepower (671 kW) electric motor. The submarines could reach 23 knots (43 km/h; 26 mph) on the surface and 8 knots (15 km/h; 9.2 mph) submerged. On the surface, the KD7s had a range of 8,000 nautical miles (15,000 km; 9,200 mi) at 16 knots (30 km/h; 18 mph); submerged, they had a range of 50 nmi (93 km; 58 mi) at 5 knots (9.3 km/h; 5.8 mph).

The submarines were armed with six internal 53.3 cm (21.0 in) torpedo tubes, all in the bow. They carried one reload for each tube; a total of a dozen torpedoes. They were originally intended to be armed with two twin-gun mounts for the 25 mm (1.0 in) Type 96 anti-aircraft gun, but a 120 mm (4.7 in) deck gun was substituted for one 25 mm mount during construction.

== Construction and commissioning ==
I-181 was laid down as Submarine No. 159 at the Kure Naval Arsenal in Kure, Japan, on 11 November 1941. She later was renamed I-81. She was launched on 2 May 1942 and provisionally attached to the Sasebo Naval District that day. She was renamed I-181 on 20 May 1942, and was both completed and commissioned on 24 May 1943.

== Service history ==
=== May–September 1943 ===
On the day of her commissioning, I-181 was formally attached to the Sasebo Naval District and assigned to Submarine Squadron 11 in the 1st Fleet, an element of the Combined Fleet, for workups. On 20 August 1943, she was reassigned to Submarine Division 22 in Submarine Squadron 3 in the 6th Fleet, also an element of the Combined Fleet. She departed Kure on 25 August 1943 bound for Truk Atoll in the Caroline Islands, which she reached on 1 September 1943.

=== First war patrol ===
On 7 September 1943, I-181 put to sea from Truk to begin her first war patrol, assigned a patrol area off Espiritu Santo in the New Hebrides. While she was on patrol, Submarine Squadron 3 was disbanded on 15 September 1943, and Submarine Division 22 was assigned directly to the 6th Fleet. She moved to the Solomon Islands to patrol in an area off Cape Esperance on the northwestern tip of Guadalcanal. She sighted no enemy ships, and on 30 September 1943 received orders to proceed to a new patrol area in the Torres Strait between southeastern New Guinea and northeastern Australia, which she reached on 2 October 1943. She attacked an Allied convoy twice in the Torres Strait on 14 October 1943, but scored no hits. She concluded her patrol with her return to Truk on 20 October 1943.

=== Second war patrol ===
I-181 got underway from Truk for her second war patrol on 11 November 1943, bound for a patrol area off Bougainville in the Solomon Islands. While at sea, she was reassigned to the 8th Fleet, an element of the Southeast Area Fleet, on 12 November 1943. On 26 November 1943, in the aftermath of the Battle of Cape St. George — fought between Japanese and United States Navy destroyers 50 nautical miles (93 km; 58 mi) east of Cape St. George, New Ireland, on 25 November 1943 — she rescued 11 survivors of the destroyer Yūgiri, which the destroyers USS Charles Ausburne (DD-570), USS Claxton (DD-571), and USS Dyson (DD-572) had sunk at 04°44′S 154°00′E, while the submarine I-177 rescued another 278 Yūgiri survivors. I-181′s patrol concluded with her arrival at Rabaul on New Britain in the Bismarck Archipelago on 29 November 1943.

=== New Guinea campaign ===
After her arrival at Rabaul, I-181 was assigned to supply duty in support of Japanese forces fighting on New Guinea in the New Guinea campaign. She set out from Rabaul on her first supply run at 09:30 on 7 December 1943 bound for Sio, New Guinea, with 44 tons of cargo that included two packages of type H ammunition, one package of type U ammunition, four packages of code books, and one package of light globes. She arrived at Sio on 9 December and came under attack by Allied bombers which dropped 15 depth charges, but she crash-dived and avoided damage. She then unloaded her cargo and proceeded to Rabaul, where she arrived at 08:00 on 11 December 1943.

On 14 December 1943, I-181 began her second New Guinea supply run. She unloaded her cargo at Buka on 16 December and got back underway the same day, returning to Rabaul on 18 December 1943. She began her third supply run on 21 December 1943, again bound for Buka, but after arriving at Buka on 22 December was unable to unload her cargo. She returned to Rabaul on 24 December 1943.

I-181 got underway from Rabaul on 28 December 1943 for her fourth supply run, heading for Sio. After delivering the cargo, she received orders to proceed to the waters north of Choiseul in the Solomon Islands to intercept an Allied task force. She did not find the Allied ships, and headed back for Rabaul. During her return voyage, she surfaced in St. George's Channel on 3 January 1944 and rescued the United States Marine Corps 26-kill ace Gregory "Pappy" Boyington, who had been shot down eight hours earlier during a fighter sweep over Rabaul and was injured when he ditched his F4U Corsair about 5 nautical miles (9.3 km; 5.8 mi) off shore. I-181 arrived at Rabaul two hours later. After World War II, Boyington said that the best treatment he received while a prisoner-of-war was during his time aboard I-181.

On 6 January 1944, I-181 began her fifth supply run. She unloaded her cargo at Buka on 7 January and headed back to Rabaul, arriving there on 9 January 1944.

With the commander of Submarine Division 22 and his staff embarked, I-181 departed Rabaul on 13 January 1944 on her sixth supply run in company with the submarine Ro-104, bound for Gali, New Guinea. The Japanese never heard from I-181 again.

=== Loss ===
The circumstances of I-181′s loss remain unclear. The Japanese garrison at Gali reported witnessing a running battle in the Vitiaz Strait off Gali on the evening of 16 January 1944 involving I-181 and an unidentified American destroyer and PT boat in which I-181 was depth-charged and sunk with the loss of all on board. A widely reproduced photograph often is alleged to show the wreck of I-181 aground in Kelanoa Harbour on the coast of New Guinea, leading to the assertion by some sources that she ran aground and was destroyed with the loss of all hands during the battle on 16 January 1944, but the photograph actually shows the wreckage of a large towed Japanese supply container destroyed on 24 December 1943 by the U.S. Navy PT boats PT-151 and PT-192. Some sources claim U.S. Navy aircraft sank I-181 in St. George's Channel on 16 January 1944.

At 23:00 on 18 January 1944, the U.S. Navy PT boat PT-143 detected a target on radar about 27 nautical miles (50 km; 31 mi) bearing 150 degrees True from Gasmata on the south coast of New Britain, and after closing to a range of 200 yards (183 m) in limited visibility identified it as a Japanese "I-61-class" submarine. The submarine submerged and PT-143 dropped two depth charges — set to explode at a depth of 50 feet (15 m) — ahead of the submarine's wake about 25 nautical miles (46 km; 29 mi) bearing 150 degrees True from Gasmata. PT-143′s crew heard a third explosion after the two depth charges detonated, but found no evidence that the depth charges damaged the submarine despite searching a 5-nautical-mile (9.3 km; 5.8 mi) area around the location of the attack until 03:00 on 19 January 1944.

At 03:01 on 21 January 1944, while patrolling 3 nautical miles (5.6 km; 3.5 mi) north of the coast of New Guinea off Weber Point, the PT boats PT-329, PT-362 and PT-364 detected a target on radar and closed with it, visually identifying it as a large submarine and tentatively describing her as having a flush deck, a conning tower disproportionately long and tall for her length, and no visible deck armament. The submarine submerged when the PT boats closed to 4,500 yards (4,100 m). The PT boats again detected the submarine on radar at 06:06, and it submerged again at a range of 2.75 nautical miles (5.09 km; 3.16 mi). PT-364 dropped one depth charge 4 nautical miles (7.4 km; 4.6 mi) to the north and another 3 nautical miles (5.6 km; 3.5 mi) to the north in an attempt to drive the submerged submarine toward the waiting PT-329 and PT-364, but none of the PT boats gained any further contact on the submarine.

On 1 March 1944, the Imperial Japanese Navy declared I-181 to be presumed lost with all 89 men aboard southwest of New Guinea. The Japanese struck her from the Navy List on 30 April 1944.
