= Japanese submarine I-177 =

1941 Type KD7 submarine

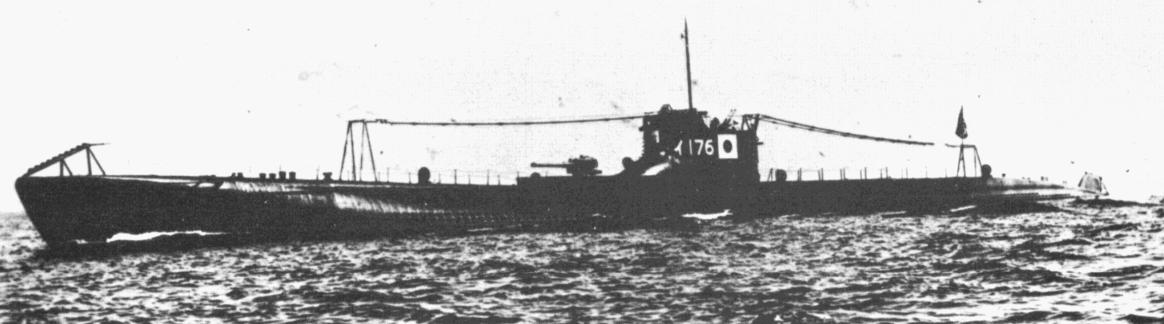
- I-176, lead submarine of the class that included I-177

History

Empire of Japan
- Name: Submarine No. 155
- Builder: Kawasaki, Kobe, Japan
- Laid down: 10 March 1941
- Renamed: I-77 on 17 December 1941
- Launched: 20 December 1941
- Renamed: I-177 on 20 May 1942
- Commissioned: 28 December 1942
- Fate: Sunk by USS Samuel S. Miles off Palau, 3 October 1944
- Stricken: 1 March 1945

General characteristics
- Class & type: Kaidai type, KD7-class
- Displacement: 1,630 long tons (1,656 t) surfaced; 2,602 long tons (2,644 t) submerged
- Length: 105.5 m (346 ft 2 in)
- Beam: 8.25 m (27 ft 1 in)
- Draft: 4.6 m (15 ft 1 in)
- Propulsion: 2 × Kampon Mk.1B Model 8 diesels, 2 shafts; 8,000 bhp (5,966 kW); Electric motors: 1,800 shp (1,342 kW)
- Speed: 23.1 knots (42.8 km/h; 26.6 mph) surfaced; 8 knots (15 km/h; 9.2 mph) submerged
- Range: 8,000 nmi (15,000 km; 9,200 mi) at 16 knots (30 km/h; 18 mph) surfaced; 50 nmi (93 km; 58 mi) at 5 knots (9.3 km/h; 5.8 mph) submerged
- Test depth: 80 m (262 ft)
- Complement: 86
- Armament: 6 × 533 mm forward torpedo tubes; 12 × Type 95 torpedoes; 1 × 120 mm (4.7 in) 11th Year Type Naval gun; 2 × Type 96 25mm AA guns

I-177 was an Imperial Japanese Navy Kaidai-type cruiser submarine of the KD7 subclass commissioned in 1942. She served during World War II, patrolling off Australia, taking part in the New Guinea campaign, operating in the North Pacific, and participating in the Palau campaign before she was sunk by the destroyer escort USS Samuel S. Miles (DE-183) in 1944, with no survivors.

== Construction and commissioning ==
Built by Kawasaki at Kobe, Japan, the submarine was laid down as Submarine No. 155 on 10 March 1941. She was both renumbered I-77 and attached provisionally to the Sasebo Naval District on 17 December 1941. Launched on 20 December 1941, she was renumbered I-177 on 20 May 1942. She was completed and commissioned on 28 December 1942.

== Service history ==
=== December 1942–April 1943 ===
Upon commissioning, I-177 was assigned to the Kure Submarine Squadron in the Kure Naval District. On 25 February 1943, she was reassigned to Submarine Division 22, which in turn was assigned directly to the 6th Fleet, an element of the Combined Fleet. Submarine Division 22 was reassigned to Submarine Squadron 3 in the 6th Fleet on 15 March 1943. On 30 March 1943, I-177 departed Kure, Japan, in company with her sister ship I-178 bound for Truk Atoll, which she reached on 7 April 1943.

=== First war patrol: AHS Centaur ===
I-177 got underway from Truk on 10 April 1943, assigned a patrol area off the east coast of Australia together with I-178 and the submarine I-180. She was near Brisbane, 20 nautical miles (37 km; 23 mi) southeast of Cape Byron on 26 April 1943 when she attacked an Allied convoy and sank the British cargo ship Limerick at 28°54′S 153°54′E. The convoy′s escorts counterattacked, dropping two depth charges, but I-177 escaped damage.

During the predawn hours of 14 May 1943, I-177, operating on the surface 40 nautical miles (74 km; 46 mi) east of Brisbane, sighted the 3,222-ton Australian hospital ship AHS Centaur 24 nautical miles (44 km; 28 mi) east-northeast of North Stradbroke Island. Centaur had departed Sydney, Australia, on 12 May 1943 bound for Port Moresby, New Guinea, via Cairns, Australia, to evacuate sick and wounded personnel during fighting in the New Guinea campaign, and was steaming northward in darkness displaying the lights and markings required of a hospital ship in wartime under the Hague Convention, I-177 nonetheless submerged to periscope depth and fired a torpedo at Centaur at 04:10 which struck her at 04:15. The torpedo ignited a fuel tank, setting the ship ablaze. Centaur rolled to port and sank within three minutes in 550 meters (1,804 ft) of water at 27°17′S 154°05′E. I-177 surfaced nearby, then departed the area. Centaur′s survivors drifted until 15 May 1943, hearing I-177′s diesel engines as she passed through the area of the sinking again on the surface in the early-morning darkness of 15 May, before a Royal Australian Air Force Avro Anson patrol aircraft sighted them clinging to debris. The United States Navy destroyer USS Mugford (DD-389) departed Brisbane to come to their assistance, arriving on the scene at 14:00 on 15 May and pulling them from the water. Of the 332 or 333 (according to different sources) crew, patients, medical staff, and passengers on board Centaur, only 64 survived. I-177 concluded her patrol with her return to Truk on 23 May 1943.

Following the end of the Pacific War in August 1945, Australian war crimes investigators investigated whether I-177 and her commanding officer, Commander Hajime Nakagawa, were responsible for sinking Centaur, but they were unable to establish this beyond reasonable doubt. Several of the investigators suspected that Nakagawa and I-177 were most likely responsible. Nakagawa survived the war and refused to speak on the subject of the sinking of Centaur, even to defend himself. However, Nakagawa was charged with ordering the machine-gunning of survivors from torpedoed ships on three different dates in February 1944 while in command of the submarine I-37. He was convicted and sentenced to four years imprisonment at Sugamo Prison as a Class B war criminal. He died in 1991.

=== Second war patrol ===
I-177 departed Truk on 14 June 1943 to begin her second war patrol, again in an area off the east coast of Australia. Almost immediately after arriving off Australia, she received orders on 30 June 1943 to move to the Solomon Islands between Santa Isabel Island and the New Georgia Islands – where U.S. landings began the New Georgia campaign that day – to attack U.S. landing forces off Rendova Island. She arrived in this new patrol area on 6 July 1943, but her patrol was uneventful. On 20 July 1943, she was reassigned to the Southeast Area Fleet, and she concluded her patrol with her arrival at Rabaul on New Britain in the Bismarck Archipelago on 24 July 1943.

=== New Guinea campaign ===
==== Lae supply runs ====
Upon arriving at Rabaul, I-177 was assigned to the support of Japanese forces fighting on New Guinea in the New Guinea campaign. She departed Rabaul on 7 August 1943 to make her first supply run to New Guinea. She arrived at Lae, New Guinea, on 9 August, unloaded her cargo there, and headed back to Rabaul, which she reached on 11 August 1943. Her next supply run began with her departure from Rabaul on 22 August 1943; she unloaded at Lae on 24 August and returned to Rabaul on 26 August 1943. On 30 August 1943, Nakagawa left I-177 to take command of the submarine I-37, and Lieutenant Commander Zenji Orita became I-177′s new commanding officer.

I-177 began her third supply run on 1 September 1943, when she departed Rabaul in company with the submarine Ro-106 for another trip to Lae, where she arrived on 3 September and unloaded her cargo. She made port at Rabaul on 5 September 1943. She put to sea from Rabaul on both 6 and 8 September 1943, returning the same evening on both occasions.

I-177 got underway from Rabaul on 10 September 1943 for her fourth supply run to Lae, which was threatened by a nearby landing on the Huon Peninsula by the Australian Army′s 9th Division that had taken place on 4 September 1943 as the Salamaua–Lae campaign neared its end. On 13 September, she received orders to divert to attack Allied landing forces at Finschhafen, New Guinea, but she found no targets there and resumed her voyage to Lae. By the time she reached Lae on 14 September 1943, it was under attack by Allied forces. She unloaded her cargo and put back to sea, where during the evening of 14 September she detected the propeller noises of what her crew assessed as several U.S. Navy destroyers at a range of a few thousand yards while she was on the surface. Assuming that the destroyers had detected her on radar, she submerged to her test depth of 100 meters (328 ft) to await a depth-charge attack, but none came. Orita concluded that the destroyers had failed to gain sonar contact on I-177 because of her depth and the negative effect of thermoclines on sonar performance. While I-177 was at sea, Submarine Division 22 was disbanded on 15 September 1943, and she was reassigned directly to the 6th Fleet. She returned to Rabaul on 17 September 1943, completing the Imperial Japanese Navy′s last supply run to Lae.

==== Finschhafen ====
On 19 September 1943, I-177 departed Rabaul′s Simpson Harbour to conduct deep-diving tests, then returned to the harbor later in the day. On 21 September, she got underway from Rabaul for a supply run to Finschhafen. While at sea, she received orders on 22 September to attack Allied landing forces in the Finschhafen area, so her crew dumped her deck cargo overboard and she headed for the landing area, which she reconnoitered on 23 September. She did not attack any ships there, and proceeded to Finschhafen, where she unloaded the rest of her cargo on 24 September during lulls in Allied air attacks. She again reconnoitered the landing area on 25 September 1943 and detected several Allied ships, but made no attacks. She returned to Rabaul on 26 September 1943.

==== Sio supply runs ====
On 2 October 1943,I-177 set out from Rabaul on her first supply run to Sio, New Guinea. She arrived there on 4 October, unloaded her cargo, and returned to Rabaul, which she reached on 6 October. On her second run, she departed Rabaul on 8 October, unloaded at Sio on 10 October, and returned to Rabaul on 12 October 1943. That day, the United States Army Air Forces Fifth Air Force attacked Rabaul in what at the time was the largest air raid of the Pacific war, with 349 aircraft striking Rabaul's airfields and Simpson Harbour off Rabaul. Moored in deep water, I-177 submerged and avoided damage during the raid.

In October and November 1943, I-177 continued to make supply runs to Sio, departing Rabaul on 19 October, visiting Sio on 21 October, and returning to Rabaul on 23 October; getting underway from Rabaul on 26 October, discharging cargo at Sio on 28 October, and arriving at Rabaul on 30 October 1943; putting to sea from Rabaul on 2 November, delivering her cargo at Sio on 4 November, and making port at Rabaul on 6 November 1943; and leaving Rabaul on 9 November, calling at Sio on 11 November, and returning to Rabaul on 13 November 1943. On 20 November 1943, she departed Rabaul in company with the submarine Ro-108 for her seventh supply run to Sio, where she unloaded her cargo on 22 November. She returned to Rabaul on 24 November 1943.

In the immediate aftermath of the Battle of Cape St. George, fought on the night of 24–25 November 1943 in the waters between Buka Island and Cape St. George on New Ireland, I-177 got underway from Rabaul on 25 November to search for survivors of the sunken destroyer Yugiri; she rescued 279 men and the submarine I-181 rescued 11. As I-177 returned to Rabaul, a U.S. Navy Lockheed PV-1 Ventura patrol bomber of Patrol Squadron 138 (VP-138) attacked her off Cape St. George on 26 November 1943, but she avoided damage. She returned to Rabaul later that day, loaded provisions, and put back to sea the same day, then again returned to Rabaul on 29 November 1943.

I-177 loaded supplies for New Guinea at Rabaul on 30 November 1943, and returned to her routine of supply runs: She departed Rabaul on 3 December 1943, called at Sio on 5 December, and returned to Rabaul on 7 December, then got back underway on 12 December 1943, visited Sio on 14 December, and returned to Rabaul on 15 December. Once again bound for Sio, she departed Rabaul on 16 December 1943 and discharged her cargo at Sio on 17 December, then conducted a brief patrol south of Marcus Bay on the coast of New Britain from 18 to 20 December before returning to Rabaul on 21 December 1943.

After leaving Rabaul on 23 December 1943 and discharging her cargo at Sio on 25 December 1943, I-177 sighted several Allied amphibious landing ships, but did not attack them. She returned to Rabaul on 27 December 1943, then put back to sea on 28 December to make her first and only supply run to Garove Island, where she arrived on 30 December 1943. She again made port at Rabaul on 1 January 1944.

On 3 January 1944, I-177 departed Rabaul to begin her twelfth Sio supply run. While at sea, she was reassigned to Submarine Squadron 1 on 5 January 1944. She arrived off Sio at sunset on 8 January 1944 and made contact with Japanese troops ashore. A daihatsu barge came alongside and began loading cargo from I-177, and a boat set out from shore carrying the commander of the 18th Army, General Hatazō Adachi, the commander of the 7th Base Unit, Rear Admiral Kyuhachi Kudo, and ten of their staff officers. Meanwhile, the U.S. Navy PT boat PT-146 detected I-177 on radar at a range of 5,000 yards (4,600 m) and headed toward I-177 in company with PT-143. One of I-177′s lookouts spotted the approaching PT boats, prompting I-177 to submerge and Adachi′s boat, which had made it about halfway to I-177, to return to shore. The two PT boats continued to search the area, later making a radar contact at a range of 1 nautical mile (1.9 km; 1.2 mi) and sighting I-177′s periscope at a range of 200 yards (180 m). Each of them dropped two depth charges, but I-177 escaped damage.

I-177 returned to Sio on the evening of 9 January 1944, but again found U.S. PT boats in the area, so she signaled Japanese forces on New Guinea that she would return on the evening of 10 January and requested their support in driving off the PT boats. When she surfaced off Sio on 10 January, the PT boats PT-320 and PT-323 approached, but I-177, armed daihatsu barges, and sokoteis (armored barges armed with tank gun turrets) engaged the two PT boats and drove them off, and I-177 suffered no damage. After taking Adachi and Kudo and their staffs aboard, she left Sio for the last time and proceeded to Madang, New Guinea, where her passengers disembarked at around 12:00 on 11 January 1944. She returned to Rabaul on 15 January 1944.

=== January–February 1944 ===
I-177′s arrival at Rabaul occurred a few days after the Japanese had decided to abandon it as a submarine base. After only a brief stop, she got underway again on 15 January 1944, leaving Rabaul for the last time, calling at Truk from 18 to 20 January, and then heading for Sasebo, which she reached on 27 January 1944. She underwent repairs at Sasebo.

=== North Pacific ===
On 25 February 1944, I-177 was assigned to the Northeast Area Fleet for operations in the North Pacific. After completion of her repairs, she departed Sasebo on 22 March 1944 and headed north, arriving at Ōminato, Japan, on 25 March 1944. She departed Ōminato on 11 April 1944 to operate in the waters off the Aleutian Islands, then returned to Ōminato on 27 May 1944. She again put to sea from Ōminato on 8 June 1944 to conduct a war patrol in the North Pacific east of the Kuril Islands. It was uneventful, and after making an overnight stop at Ōminato from 22 to 23 June 1944, she headed for Yokosuka, where she arrived on 25 June 1944 and began repairs. When Submarine Division 22 was disbanded on 10 August 1944, she was reassigned to Submarine Division 34.

=== Palau Islands campaign ===
The Battle of Peleliu and Battle of Angaur began in the Palau Islands on 15 September 1944 when United States Marine Corps forces landed on Peleliu and United States Army forces on Angaur. On 19 September 1944, I-177 departed Kure, Japan, with the commander of Submarine Division 34 embarked to conduct a war patrol off the Palaus, off Halmahera in the Japanese-occupied Netherlands East Indies, and off Mindanao in the Philippine Islands. When she arrived in her patrol area off the Palaus on 24 September 1944, she received orders to reconnoiter Ulithi Atoll in the Caroline Islands.

=== Loss ===
I-177 had completed her reconnaissance of Ulithi and was on the surface returning to her patrol area off the Palaus when a U.S. Navy PBM Mariner flying boat of Patrol Bomber Squadron 16 (VPB-16) detected her on radar on the evening of 1 October 1944. As the aircraft approached, I-177 crash-dived, but not before the Mariner′s crew identified her as a Japanese submarine. The Mariner dropped a Mark 24 FIDO acoustic homing torpedo which inflicted heavy damage on I-177. The Mariner then passed I-177′s position to a nearby hunter-killer group centered around the escort aircraft carrier USS Hoggatt Bay (CVE-75), which began a search for I-177.

Hoggatt Bay was north-northeast of Angaur at 03:11 on 3 October 1944 when she made radar contact on I-177 at a range of 20,000 yards (18,300 m). The destroyer escort USS Samuel S. Miles (DE-183) was detached from Hoggatt Bay′s screen to investigate. At 04:40, Samuel S. Miles′s lookouts sighted I-177 on the surface and she steered toward I-177. I-177 crash-dived, but Samuel S. Miles gained sonar contact on her. Samuel S. Miles fired a salvo of 24 Hedgehog projectiles, and then a second salvo that sank I-177 at 07°48′N 133°28′E with the loss of all 101 men on board, about 12 nautical miles (22 km; 14 mi) from where the PBM attacked her.

On 4 October 1944, the Japanese transmitted an order to I-177 to return after completing her reconnaissance of Ulithi Atoll, but she never acknowledged the order. On 18 November 1944, the Imperial Japanese Navy declared her to be presumed lost with all hands in the Palaus area. The Japanese removed her from the navy list on 1 March 1945.
