= USS Owasco =

Gunboat of the United States Navy

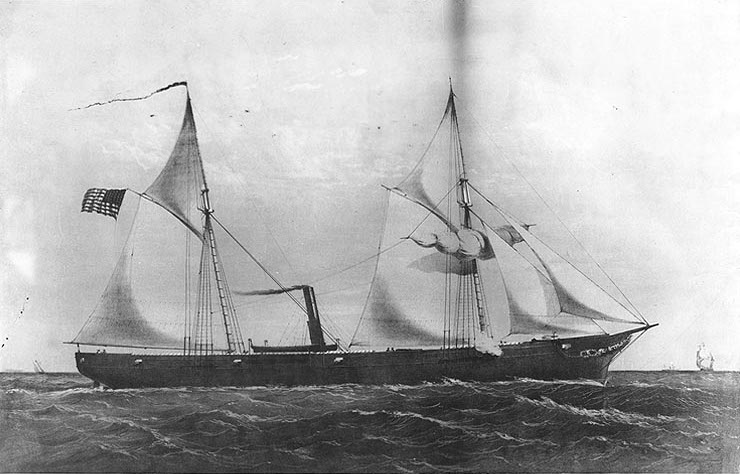
- USS Owasco, 1861

History

United States
- Launched: 5 October 1861
- Commissioned: 23 January 1862
- Decommissioned: 12 July 1865
- Fate: Sold, 25 October 1865

General characteristics
- Class & type: Unadilla-class gunboat
- Displacement: 691 tons
- Tons burthen: 507
- Length: 158 ft (48 m) (waterline)
- Beam: 28 ft (8.5 m)
- Draft: 9 ft 6 in (2.90 m) (max.)
- Depth of hold: 12 ft (3.7 m)
- Propulsion: 2 × 200 IHP 30-in bore by 18 in stroke horizontal back-acting engines; single screw
- Sail plan: Two-masted schooner
- Speed: 10 kn (11.5 mph)
- Complement: 114
- Armament: Original: 1 × 11-in Dahlgren smoothbore; 2 × 24-pdr smoothbore; 2 × 20-pdr Parrott rifle

USS Owasco was a Unadilla-class gunboat built for the Union Navy during the American Civil War. She was named for Owasco Lake.

Owasco, built by Charles Mallory, was launched at Mystic, Connecticut, 5 October 1861; delivered to the Navy at New York Navy Yard 6 December 1861; and commissioned there 23 January 1862, Lt. John Guest in command.

The new "ninety-day gunboat" departed New York 5 February and reached Key West, Florida, 10 days later where Comdr. David D. Porter's mortar flotilla was assembling. She then headed via Ship Island, Mississippi for Pass a L’Outre. En route, on 16 March, she captured schooners Eugenia and President laden with cotton and bound for Havana.

The mortar flotilla had been established by the Navy to neutralize forts St. Philip and Jackson which protected New Orleans, Louisiana against attack from the sea. Owasco was one of seven steamers assigned to the flotilla to tow the schooners and help them navigate safely in the tricky currents of the Mississippi River. In mid-April she and her sister steamers moved the schooners into position below the forts. On the 18th, when the mortars opened fire on the Southern positions, the steamers supported the attack with flat trajectory fire until, six days later, David Farragut led his deep draft vessels in a historic dash past the Confederate heavy works. The following day New Orleans fell, depriving the South of its largest city and greatest industrial and commercial center. One of Owasco's sailors, Quartermaster Edward Farrell, was awarded the Medal of Honor for his part in the battle.

When Farragut ascended the Mississippi for the second time, Owasco helped to tow the schooners up river to a position just below Vicksburg, Mississippi from which they bombarded the Confederate cliffside batteries 28 June as Farragut raced under the Southern guns to join the Western Gunboat Flotilla above Vicksburg.

Owasco participated in the bombardment and capture of Galveston, Texas 3 October; but, on New Year’s day, was driven out of that port by Confederates in cotton clad steamers.

After continuing blockade duty, she participated in the joint Army-Navy capture of Brazos, Texas 3 November 1863. She captured the English schooner Fanny 19 April 1864, carrying cargo for Confederate General Magruder from Havana. She continued to serve along the coast of Texas through the end of the war.

She decommissioned at New York Navy Yard 12 July 1865 and was sold at auction at New York 25 October 1865.

== See also ==
- Union Blockade
