= Edward Farrell (Medal of Honor) =

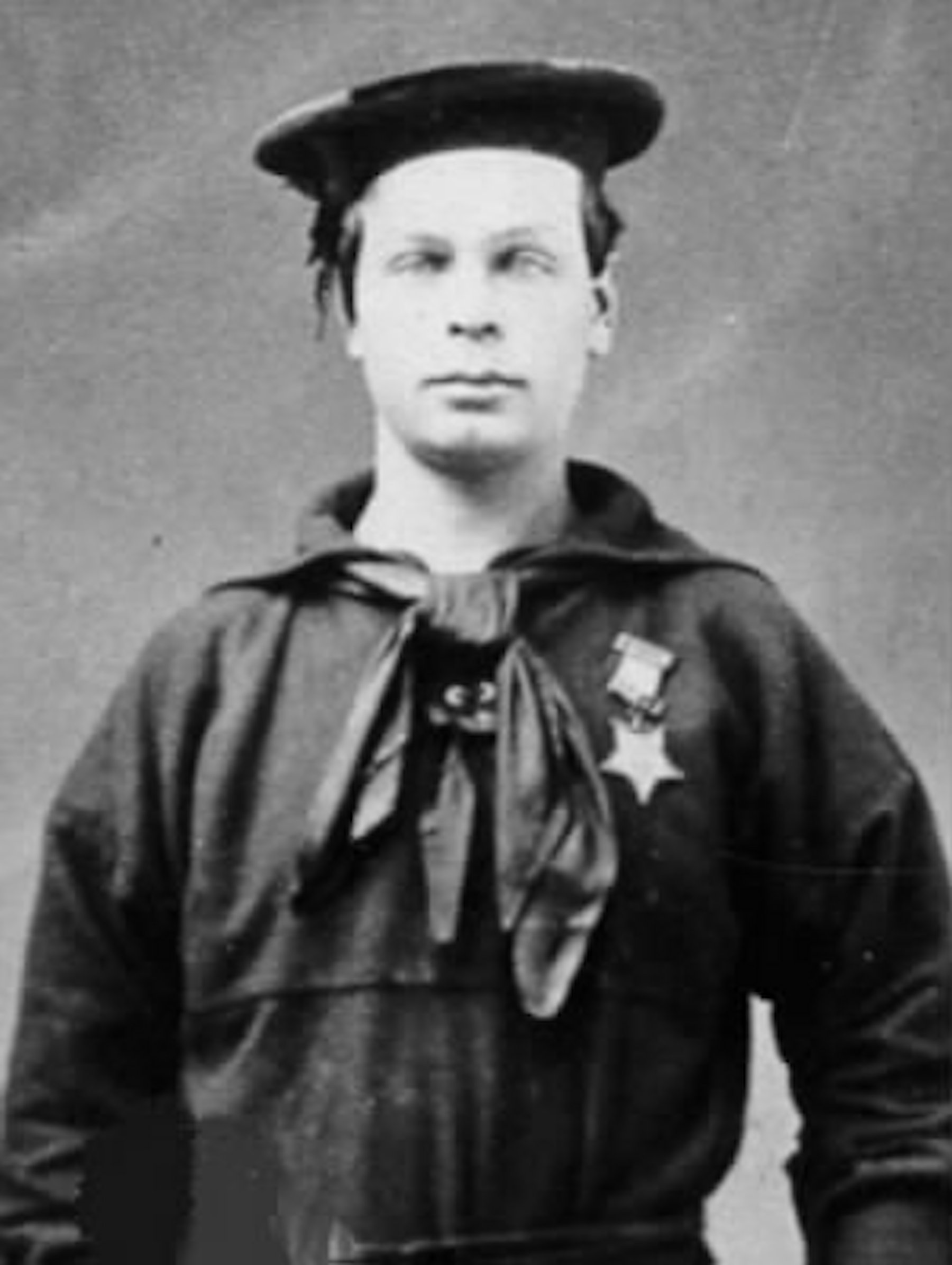
- Photo identified as possibly Edward Farrell
- Born: c. 1833; Saratoga, New York
- Died: March 23, 1902 (aged 68–69); Edinburg Township, Ohio
- Military career
- Allegiance: United States
- Branch: United States Navy
- Rank: Quartermaster
- Unit: USS Owasco
- Conflicts: American Civil War • Battle of Forts Jackson and St. Philip
- Awards: Medal of Honor

Edward Farrell (c. 1833–1902) was a Union Navy sailor in the American Civil War and a recipient of the U.S. military's highest decoration, the Medal of Honor, for his actions at the Battle of Forts Jackson and St. Philip.

Born in about 1833 in Saratoga, New York, Farrell was still living in that state when he joined the Navy. He served during the Civil War as a quartermaster on the USS Owasco. At the Battle of Forts Jackson and St. Philip near New Orleans on April 24, 1862, he stood atop the mast and showed "intelligence, coolness and capacity" while acting as an artillery observer for Owasco's guns. For this action, he was awarded the Medal of Honor a year later, on April 3, 1863.

Farrell's official Medal of Honor citation reads:

The President of the United States of America, in the name of Congress, takes pleasure in presenting the Medal of Honor to Quartermaster Edward Farrell, United States Navy, for extraordinary heroism in action while serving on board the USS Owasco during the attack upon Forts Jackson and St. Philip, Louisiana, 24 April 1862. Stationed at the masthead during these operations, Quartermaster Farrell observed and reported the effect of the fire of our guns in such a manner as to make his intelligence, coolness and capacity conspicuous.

== See also ==
- List of American Civil War Medal of Honor recipients: A–F
