= Kelanoa =

Town in Papua New Guinea

Coordinates: 6°01′S 147°30′E

Kelanoa is a town on the north coast of Huon Peninsula, Papua New Guinea.

It is served by Kelanoa Airport and Kelanoa Harbour.

Kelanoa is home of paradise, beautiful beaches, and lagoon.

== History ==
Kelanoa is a town on the North Coast of Morobe. Kelanoa is a town in Huon Peninsula of Morobe. The native people of Kelanoa are called Gitua. Current population of about 2,000 heads. Home of beautiful culture and farming. Language group of Ngero vitiaz Australasian Language. The Imperial Japanese occupied the town during World War II. On 5 January 1944, Australian Army units pushing north along the Huon Peninsula in the Huon Peninsula campaign liberated the town.
