= USS Guest =

Fletcher-class destroyer

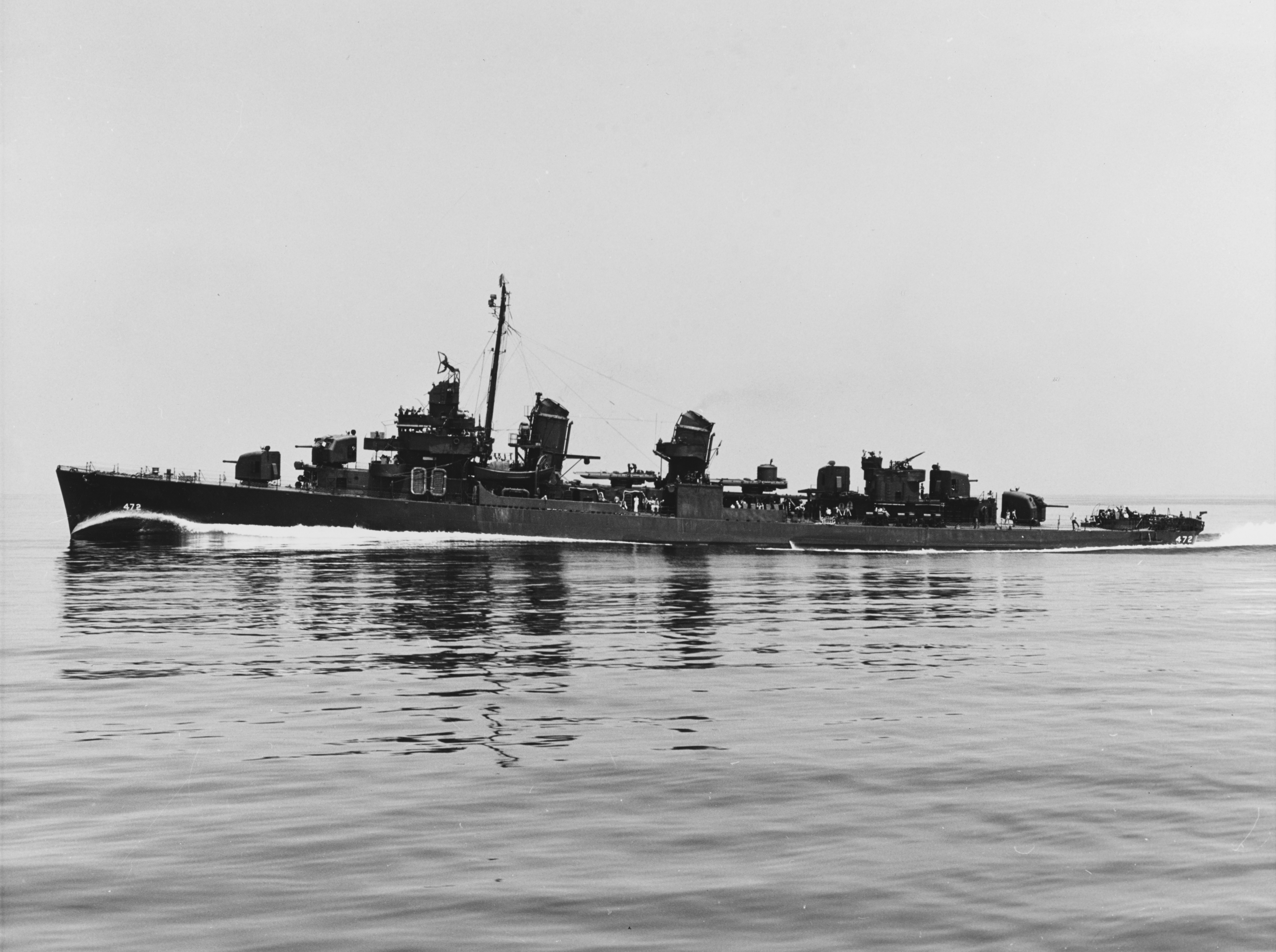
- USS Guest

History

United States
- Name: Guest
- Namesake: John Guest
- Builder: Boston Navy Yard
- Laid down: 27 September 1941
- Launched: 20 February 1942
- Commissioned: 15 December 1942
- Decommissioned: 4 June 1946
- Stricken: 1 August 1973
- Fate: Transferred to Brazil, 5 June 1959

History

Brazil
- Name: Para (D27)
- Acquired: 5 June 1959
- Stricken: 1978
- Fate: Sunk as target 23 February 1983

General characteristics
- Class & type: Fletcher-class destroyer
- Displacement: 2,050 tons
- Length: 376 ft 6 in (114.7 m)
- Beam: 39 ft 8 in (12.1 m)
- Draft: 17 ft 9 in (5.4 m)
- Propulsion: 60,000 shp (45 MW); 2 propellers
- Speed: 35 knots (65 km/h; 40 mph)
- Range: 6500 nmi. (12,000 km) at 15 kt
- Complement: 336
- Armament: 5 × single Mk 12 5 in (127 mm)/38 guns; 5 × twin 40 mm (1.6 in) Bofors AA guns; 7 × single 20 mm (0.8 in) Oerlikon AA guns; 2 × quintuple 21 in (533 mm) torpedo tubes; 6 × single depth charge throwers; 2 × depth charge racks

USS Guest (DD-472), a Fletcher-class destroyer, was a ship of the United States Navy named for Commodore John Guest (1822–1879). Guest was launched 20 February 1942 by the Boston Naval Shipyard; sponsored by Mrs. Ann Guest Walsh, granddaughter of Com. Guest; commissioned 15 December 1942, Commander Henry Crommelin in command, and saw service in the Pacific Theater during World War II. Guest decommissioned in 1946 and was transferred on loan to the Brazilian Navy in 1959, where she served as Pará (D27). She was stricken in 1979 and was sunk as a target ship in 1983.

== 1943 ==
After shakedown training at Guantanamo Bay, Guest made a cruise to Trinidad with aircraft carrier Independence (CVL-22). This was followed by a convoy escort voyage from New York to Casablanca and return to Boston (28 April – 31 May 1943). She departed Boston 20 July for brief training in Hawaiian waters, then joined the 3rd Fleet 28 August at Efate, New Hebrides Islands. After an offensive sweep to the Santa Cruz Islands and several escort missions to Nouméa, New Caledonia, she departed Efate 28 October for invasion of Bougainville. She guarded transports during the initial landings 1 November assisting in shooting down two enemy bombers. In the following months she escorted troop and logistic convoys from Guadalcanal to Cape Torokina, twice driving off bombers and torpedo planes which attacked her convoy. She silenced Japanese coastal defense guns at Motupene Point, Bougainville, 4 December 1943, and bombarded the Saba River area 25 January 1944.

== 1944 ==
Guest protected transports landing the Marine Raiders on Green Island 31 January 1944. As the Raiders reembarked the next morning, she made two depth charge attacks on a diving submarine. Hudson (DD-475) followed up this attack to complete the kill of the 1,400-ton Japanese submarine I-171. Guest again screened transports during invasion of the Green Islands 15 February 1944. She bombarded Kavieng, New Ireland 25 February, and the Sanba River area on Bougainville 17 March. She rescued the crew of PT-63 on the latter date. In a case of mistaken identity on 17 March motor torpedo boat PT-283 was sunk by friendly fire from destroyer Guest (DD-472), in the Solomons, near Choseul Island. Her 5-inch gunfire destroyed the grounded Japanese freighter Meisyo Maru 30 April to the east of Nemto Island. After amphibious assault training in the New Hebrides, she departed from Roi, in the Marshall Islands, 10 June 1944 for the invasion and capture of the Mariana Islands.

Guest poured gunfire ahead of troops landing on Saipan 15 June 1944, then helped repel four massive air raids against Admiral Marc Mitscher's Fast Carrier Task Force in the Battle of the Philippine Sea. She also conducted pre-invasion bombardment of Guam and gave direct gunfire support to the landings on Guam 21 July 1944. She remained on bombardment support and patrol stations until 9 August, then sailed for amphibious warfare exercises in the Solomons.

Guest departed Purvis Bay, Solomon Islands, 6 September 1944. A unit of Rear Admiral Jesse Oldendorf's Western Fire Support group, she bombarded Angaur in the Palau Islands 12 September 1944. The following day she rescued 7 officers and 45 men of destroyer Perry (DMS-17), which hit a mine and sank off Angaur. Guest departed the area 25 September and entered San Francisco Bay 25 October 1944 for overhaul.

== 1945 ==
Overhaul was followed by training in Hawaiian waters until 27 January 1945 when she departed with a task group bound via the Marianas for Iwo Jima. Her 5-inch guns blasted that island during the initial invasion 19 February 1945. She continued gunfire support until 28 February when she sailed to join the screen of escort carriers in San Pedro Bay, Philippine Islands.

Guest departed San Pedro Bay 27 March to guard escort carriers giving direct support to the invasion of Okinawa. Detached 9 May, she was assigned to antiaircraft defense station in the Okinawas western transport area. The night of 25 May a kamikaze suicide plane glanced off her mast and crashed alongside to portside, causing damage to the stack. She remained on antiaircraft defense station until 1 July 1945. She was then routed via Ulithi and the Marshalls in the screen of escort carriers bound to Adak, Alaska, thence to Ominato, Japan. After plane guard duty with carriers along the coast of Honshū, she returned via Adak to the Puget Sound Naval Shipyard 15 November 1945.

Guest decommissioned at San Diego 4 June 1946 and remained in reserve until transferred 5 June 1959 on loan to the government of Brazil.

== Brazilian service ==
The ship served in the Brazilian Navy as Pará (D27). She was stricken in 1979. After decommissioning she was used during 1982 and 1983 as a target ship for gunnery and torpedo practice and for Exocet MM 38 anti-ship missiles launched by the Brazilian frigate Niterói. On 23 February 1983, she was sunk by two torpedoes fired by the Brazilian submarine Ceará (S 14) in the Atlantic Ocean off the coast of Brazil approximately 80 nautical miles (148 km) south of Cabo Frio lighthouse.

== Honors ==
Guest received eight battle stars for service in World War II.
