= USS Samuel S. Miles =

Cannon-class destroyer escort

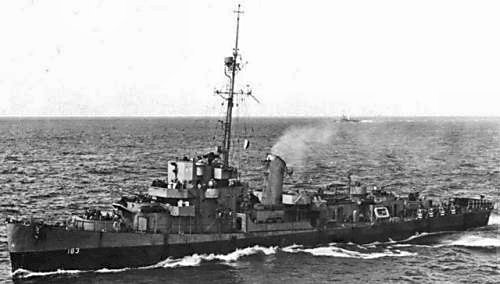
- USS Samuel S. Miles (DE-183)

History

United States
- Name: USS Samuel S. Miles (DE-183)
- Namesake: Samuel Stockton Miles
- Builder: Federal Shipbuilding and Drydock Company, Newark, New Jersey
- Laid down: 5 July 1943
- Launched: 3 October 1943
- Commissioned: 4 November 1943
- Decommissioned: 28 March 1946
- Stricken: 26 September 1950
- Honors and awards: 8 battle stars (World War II)
- Fate: Transferred to France, 12 August 1950
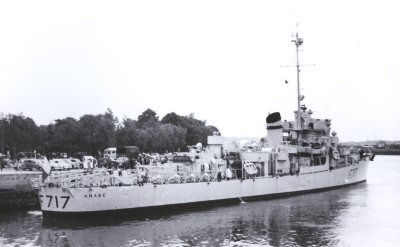
- French destroyer escort Arabe (F717)

History

France
- Name: Arabe (F717)
- Namesake: Arab people
- Acquired: 12 August 1950
- Stricken: 1968
- Fate: Broken up, 1968

General characteristics
- Class & type: Cannon-class destroyer escort
- Displacement: 1,240 long tons (1,260 t) standard; 1,620 long tons (1,646 t) full
- Length: 306 ft (93 m) o/a; 300 ft (91 m) w/l
- Beam: 36 ft 10 in (11.23 m)
- Draft: 11 ft 8 in (3.56 m)
- Propulsion: 4 × GM Mod. 16-278A diesel engines with electric drive, 6,000 shp (4,474 kW), 2 screws
- Speed: 21 knots (39 km/h; 24 mph)
- Range: 10,800 nmi (20,000 km) at 12 kn (22 km/h; 14 mph)
- Complement: 15 officers and 201 enlisted
- Armament: 3 × single Mk.22 3"/50 caliber guns; 1 × twin 40 mm Mk.1 AA gun; 8 × 20 mm Mk.4 AA guns; 3 × 21-inch (533 mm) torpedo tubes; 1 × Hedgehog Mk.10 anti-submarine mortar (144 rounds); 8 × Mk.6 depth charge projectors; 2 × Mk.9 depth charge tracks

USS Samuel S. Miles (DE-183) was a Cannon-class destroyer escort built for the United States Navy during World War II. She served in the Pacific Ocean and provided escort service against submarine and air attack for Navy vessels and convoys. She returned home at war's end with eight battle stars to her credit.

== Namesake ==
Samuel Stockton Miles was born on 12 November 1913 in Philadelphia, Pennsylvania. He received a B.A. degree from Princeton University, Princeton, New Jersey, in 1936, and an M.D. degree from the Johns Hopkins University, Baltimore, Maryland, in 1940. He was appointed Lieutenant (jg.), Medical Corps, USNR, on 16 May 1942. During the American landings on Tulagi, Solomon Islands, 7 August 1942, he sought to administer medical treatment in the forward area. While attempting to reach casualties despite hostile fire, he was killed by the enemy. He was posthumously awarded the Silver Star.

== History ==
She was laid down on 5 July 1943 by the Federal Shipbuilding and Drydock Co., Newark, New Jersey; launched on 3 October 1943; sponsored by Mrs. Samuel S. Miles; and commissioned on 4 November 1943.

=== World War II Pacific Theatre operations ===
Following shakedown off Bermuda, Samuel S. Miles departed New York City, on 30 December 1943, and steamed via the Panama Canal to the Marshall Islands, arriving on 19 February 1944.

Serving as an escort ship in the Marshall Islands area, she protected fleet oilers during fast carrier air strikes against the Caroline Islands and the Hollandia, New Guinea, area in April.

==== Shoots down three Japanese planes, sinks one submarine ====
Next she guarded oilers during the capture of Saipan and Tinian, and splashed two enemy planes on 18 June. She supported the Leyte and Luzon, Philippine Islands, campaigns in late 1944 and early 1945. Samuel S. Miles sank I-177 near the Palau Islands on 3 October. After guarding the invasion force at Iwo Jima in February, she was assigned to Task Force 54 (TF 54) for the invasion of Okinawa, where she screened the larger ships in that bombardment group as they pounded Okinawa in the week prior to the 1 April assault landings. Samuel S. Miles destroyed one enemy plane on 27 March.

==== Targeted by Okinawa kamikaze ====
As the Japanese air arm had been decimated by this point in the war, the lack of trained and experienced pilots led to its most extensive deployment of ’'kamikaze'’ attacks during this battle. A kamikaze near-miss on the Samuel S. Miles killed one of her crew members on 11 April, and damaged some of her equipment. After screening escort carriers operating north of Okinawa, she sailed to the West Coast in July.

=== Post-War decommissioning ===
After overhaul, she sailed via the Panama Canal to Norfolk, Virginia, arriving on 21 October. Reaching St. Johns River, Florida, on 8 November 1945, she was decommissioned and entered the Reserve Fleet on 28 March 1946. Samuel S. Miles was transferred to France under the Mutual Defense Assistance Program on 12 August 1950. and was renamed Arabe, with the pennant number F 717. She was formally struck from the US Navy List on 26 September 1950. She was stricken from French service in 1958. (Note: Jane's Fighting Ships says that Arabe was formally stricken from French service in 1960, while Friedman claims the ship was broken up in 1968.)

== Awards ==
Samuel S. Miles received eight battle stars for World War II service.

== See also ==
- List of Escorteurs of the French Navy
