= John Guest (naval officer) =

John Guest (7 March 1822 – 12 January 1879) was a commodore of the United States Navy, whose active-duty career lasted from the late 1830s through the Civil War.

Guest was born in Missouri on 7 March 1822. He was appointed midshipman 16 December 1837, served in the frigate Congress during the Mexican–American War, and protected foreign residents from Chinese Imperial forces at Shanghai in April 1854.

During the Civil War, he held several sea commands and participated in actions along the Gulf Coast. He commanded Owasco and Sangamon, passing the forts for the capture of New Orleans and engaging Confederate batteries in the siege of Vicksburg. He also took part in the capture of the forts at Galveston, Texas, and the capture of Fort Fisher, North Carolina.

After the Civil War, Guest became a member of the Military Order of the Loyal Legion of the United States, a military society for officers who had served the Union during the war.

He was promoted to commodore in 1873, and at the time of his death was commandant of the Portsmouth Navy Yard in Kittery, Maine.
