= 10 cm/50 Type 88 naval gun =

Dual purpose gun used by the Japanese Navy (1932–1945)

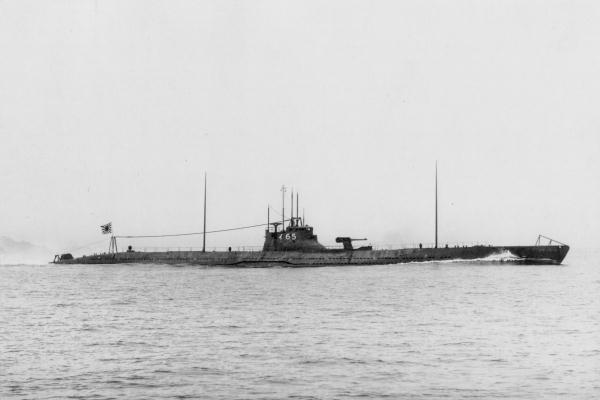
- A 10 cm/50 Type 88 naval gun aboard I-165 in 1932.
- Type: Naval gun
- Place of origin: Empire of Japan

Service history
- In service: 1932–1945
- Used by: Imperial Japanese Navy
- Wars: World War II

Production history
- Designed: 1928

Specifications
- Mass: 2,830 kg (6,240 lb)
- Length: 5.3 m (17 ft 5 in)
- Barrel length: 5 m (16 ft 5 in)
- Shell: Fixed Quick Fire; 100 mm x 380 mm
- Shell weight: 13 kg (29 lb)
- Caliber: 100 mm (3.9 in)
- Breech: Horizontal sliding block
- Recoil: Hydro-pneumatic
- Carriage: Central Pivot
- Elevation: -7° to +90°
- Traverse: -150° to +150°
- Rate of fire: Theoretical: 12 rpm Practical: 6 rpm
- Muzzle velocity: 885–895 m/s (2,900–2,940 ft/s)
- Effective firing range: 11,200 m (36,700 ft) at +90°
- Maximum firing range: 16.2 km (10 mi) at +45°
- Feed system: Manual

The 10 cm/50 Type 88 naval gun was a dual-purpose gun used by the Imperial Japanese Navy during World War II.

== Description ==
There were two variants of the 10 cm/50 Type 88 naval gun. One variant had a removable barrel liner while the other had an autofretted monoblock barrel. Both variants had horizontal sliding block breaches, hydro-pneumatic recoil mechanism, and Fixed Quick Fire ammunition. They were dual-purpose guns mounted on HA/LA central pivot mounts with a wide range of elevation that allowed the guns to be used against surface and aerial targets. The gun was capable of a theoretical rate of fire of 12 rounds per minute but this was limited to a practical rate of fire of 6 rounds per minute due to the speed of the pneumatic shell hoist.

== Uses ==
The 10 cm/50 Type 88 naval gun was used as a Deck gun aboard I-165 class Type KD5 submarines of the Imperial Japanese Navy during World War II.

== Bibliography ==
- Campbell, John (1985). Naval Weapons of World War II. Annapolis, Maryland: Naval Institute Press. ISBN 0-87021-459-4.
