= 12 cm 11th Year Type naval gun =

World War II Japanese naval gun and coast defense gun

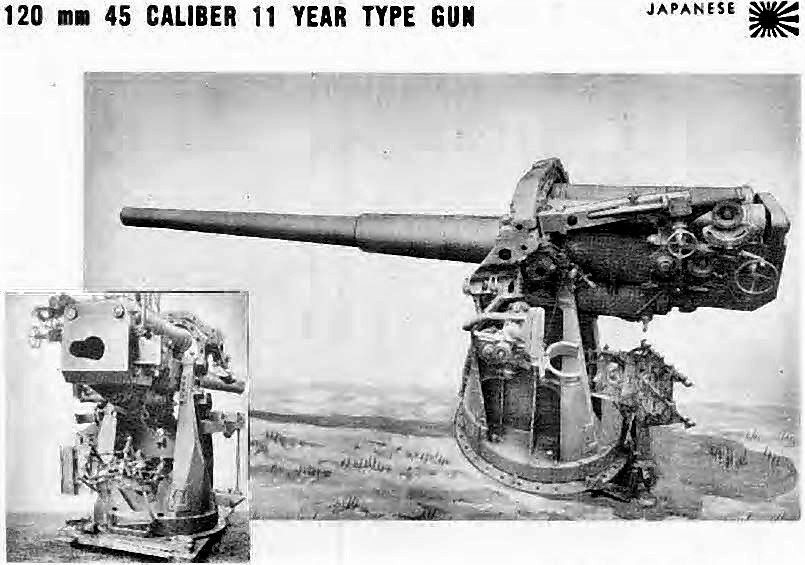
- A 11th Year Type in a coastal artillery role.
- Type: Naval gun Coastal artillery Deck gun
- Place of origin: Empire of Japan

Service history
- In service: 1922–1945
- Used by: Imperial Japanese Navy
- Wars: World War II

Specifications
- Mass: 3,250 kg (7,170 lb)
- Length: 5.26 m (17 ft 3 in)
- Barrel length: 4.42 m (14 ft 6 in)
- Height: 2.1 m (7 ft)
- Shell: Separate loading 120 x 550R cased charges and projectiles
- Shell weight: 44 lb 12 oz (20.3 kg)
- Caliber: 120 mm (4.7 in)
- Breech: Horizontal sliding-block
- Recoil: Hydro-pneumatic
- Carriage: Pedestal mount
- Elevation: Ship: +10° to +55° Submarine: +10° to +33°
- Traverse: 360°
- Rate of fire: 5-6 rounds per minute
- Muzzle velocity: 2,700 ft/s (820 m/s)
- Effective firing range: 17,500 yd (16,000 m) at 33°

The 12 cm 11th Year Type naval gun was a Japanese naval gun and coast defense gun used on submarines, minesweepers, and torpedo boats of the Imperial Japanese Navy during World War II.

== Design ==
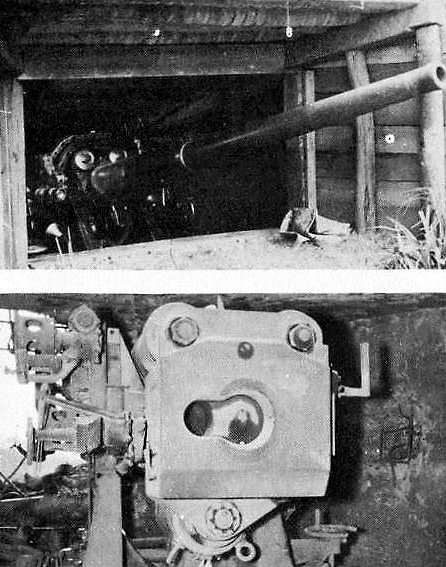
12 cm 11th Year Type coastal gun

The 12 cm 11th Year Type was a 1922 redesign of the earlier 12 cm/45 3rd Year Type naval gun. The 11th Year Type was a typical built-up gun the period with a central rifled tube surrounded by layers of reinforcing tubes. There may have also been an autofretted mono-block barreled version of the same gun. Estimates on the length of the barrel range between 40 and 45 calibers. The 11th Year Type barrel rested in a ring cradle on a pedestal mount and had a hydro-pneumatic recoil mechanism that consisted of one recoil cylinder below the barrel and two on top. The 11th Year Type differed from the earlier 3rd Year Type because it had a horizontal sliding-block breech and fired separate loading cased charges and projectiles while the earlier gun fired separate loading bagged charges and projectiles. The 11th Year Type was used on smaller naval vessels and submarines possibly because a cased charge was easier to load and wasn't as susceptible to water damage on wet decks. The 11th Year Type had a wider range of elevation and traverse than the 3rd Year Type but with a maximum elevation of +55°, it wasn't really a dual-purpose gun.

== Ammunition ==
Type	Weight
Common Type 0	45 lb (20 kg)
Common Type 1	45 lb (20 kg)
Anti-Submarine 1a	36 lb 5 oz (16.5 kg)
Illumination 2a	45 lb (20 kg)

== Naval use ==
- Ōtori-class torpedo boats
- Tomozuru-class torpedo boats
- I153-class submarines
- I156-class submarines
- I171-class submarines
- I174-class submarines
- I176-class submarines
- I61-class submarines
- W1-class minesweepers

== Weapons of comparable role, performance and era ==
- BL 4.7 inch /45 naval gun: British equivalent
- 5"/51 caliber gun: US Navy equivalent

== Bibliography ==
- Campbell, John (1985). Naval Weapons of World War Two. Annapolis, Maryland: Naval Institute Press. ISBN 0-87021-459-4.
