= Thornton =

Thornton, Thorntons or Thorton's may refer to:

== People and fictional characters ==
- Thornton (surname), a list people and fictional characters
- Thornton (given name), a list of people

== Places ==
=== Australia ===
- Thornton, New South Wales, a suburb in the City of Maitland
- Thornton, Queensland, a rural locality
- Thornton Peak, Queensland
- Thornton, South Australia, a former town
- Thornton, Victoria, a town

=== Canada ===
- Thornton, Ontario, an unincorporated place

=== New Zealand ===
- Thornton, Bay of Plenty, a settlement
- Thornton, Waikato, a suburb of Hamilton

=== South Africa ===
- Thornton, Cape Town, a suburb of Cape Town

=== United Kingdom ===
- Thornton, Angus, a location
- Thornton, Buckinghamshire
- Thornton, East Riding of Yorkshire
- Thornton, Fife
- Thornton, Lancashire, a village
- Thornton, Leicestershire, a village
  - Thornton Reservoir, near the village
- Thornton, Lincolnshire
- Thornton, Merseyside, a village
- Thornton, Northumberland, a location
- Thornton, Middlesbrough, North Yorkshire
- Thornton, Pembrokeshire
- Thornton, West Yorkshire, a village and former civil parish
- Thornton Curtis, Lincolnshire
  - Thornton Abbey, a medieval abbey near Thornton Curtis
- Thornton Heath, London
- Thornton Hough, Merseyside
- Thornton in Craven, North Yorkshire
- Thornton in Lonsdale, North Yorkshire
- Thornton-le-Beans, North Yorkshire
- Thornton-le-Clay, North Yorkshire
- Thornton-le-Dale, North Yorkshire (also simply Thornton Dale)
- Thornton le Moor, Lincolnshire
- Thornton-le-Moor, North Yorkshire
- Thornton-le-Moors, Cheshire
- Thornton-le-Street, North Yorkshire
- Thornton Rust, North Yorkshire
- Thornton Steward, North Yorkshire
- Thornton Watlass, North Yorkshire
- Thornton (ward), an electoral ward of the Lambeth London Borough Council

=== United States ===
- Thornton Creek, a stream in Seattle, Washington, USA

==== Communities ====
- Thornton, Arkansas, a city
- Thornton, California, a census-designated place
- Thornton, Colorado, a home rule city
- Thornton, Idaho, an unincorporated community
- Thornton, Illinois, a village
- Thornton Township, Cook County, Illinois
- Thornton, Iowa, a city
- Thornton, Kentucky, an unincorporated community and coal town
- Thornton, Mississippi, an unincorporated community
- Thornton Township, Buffalo County, Nebraska
- Thornton, New Hampshire, a town
- Thornton, Pennsylvania, an unincorporated community
- Thornton, Rhode Island, a neighborhood
- Thornton, Texas, a town
- Thornton, West Virginia, an unincorporated community
- Thornton, Wisconsin, a census-designated place
- Thornton Gap, in the Blue Ridge Mountains in Virginia

== Business ==
- Thorntons LLC, a U.S. gasoline and convenience store chain
- Thorntons, a UK chocolate brand
- Thornton's Bookshop, a university bookshop in Oxford, England
- Thornton's Restaurant, St. Stephen's Green, County Dublin, Ireland, from 1989 to 2016

== Schools ==
- Thornton Academy, a private 6-12 school in Saco, Maine, United States
- USC Thornton School of Music, the music school of the University of Southern California

== Other uses ==
- USS Thornton, several United States Navy ships
- Thornton Tunnel, a freight railway tunnel in Burnaby, British Columbia, Canada
- Thornton Viaduct a disused railway bridge in Thornton, in the City of Bradford, West Yorkshire, England

== See also ==
- Thornton Affair, an 1846 battle between Mexican and American forces
- Thornton Bay, New Zealand, a settlement on the Coromandel Peninsula
- Thornton Castle, East Lothian, Scotland
- Thornton Castle, Marykirk, Aberdeenshire, Scotland
- Thornton expedition, a 1608 Tuscan expedition sent to explore Brazil and the Amazon River and to establish a settlement
- Thornton Hibs F.C., a Scottish football club
- Thornton Hall (disambiguation)
- Thornton House (disambiguation)
- Thornton Manor, Thornton Hough, Wirral, Merseyside, England
- Thorton (disambiguation)
