= Convoy GP55 =

Convoy of Allied ships that travelled from Sydney to Brisbane in June 1943

- Part of the Pacific War, World War II
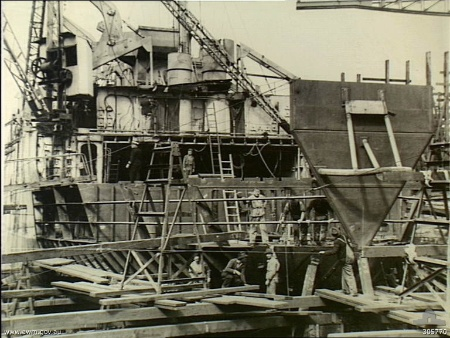
- USS LST-469 under repair in August 1943
Date	15–20 June 1943
Location	Australian east coast
Result	Japanese victory

Belligerents
Empire of Japan	Australia; United States

Strength
One submarine	Five corvettes Ten cargo ships Three LSTs

Casualties and losses
One submarine lightly damaged One submarine possibly sunk	One transport ship sunk one LST damaged 28 killed and 21 injured

Convoy GP55 was a convoy of Allied ships that travelled from Sydney to Brisbane in June 1943 during World War II. It comprised ten cargo ships, three landing ships, tank (LSTs) and an escort of five corvettes. The Japanese submarine I-174 attacked the convoy on 16 June, sinking the United States Army transport ship Portmar and damaging USS LST-469. Two of the corvettes counter-attacked I-174, but only lightly damaged her.

The Australian military conducted an intensive search for I-174 in the days after the attack in the mistaken belief that she had been significantly damaged. This search was not successful and highlighted the unsatisfactory communications between the Royal Australian Navy (RAN) and Royal Australian Air Force (RAAF). However, another Japanese submarine passing through the area may have been sunk by RAAF aircraft. Because of Japan's deteriorating strategic situation, I-174 was the last Imperial Japanese Navy (IJN) submarine to operate off the Australian east coast.

== Background ==
During 1942 and 1943, Japanese submarines periodically operated in the waters surrounding Australia. A force of midget submarines raided Sydney Harbour on the night of 31 May – 1 June 1942 and attacks on merchant shipping travelling off the east coast began several days later. These attacks continued until August 1942, when the Japanese submarine force was redeployed. The Kaidai-class submarine I-174 made a 24-day patrol off Australia in July and August 1942, but did not attack any ships. In response to the Japanese attacks, the Australian naval authorities ordered that all ships with a displacement of more than 1,200 tons and a maximum speed of less than 12 knots travel in escorted convoys from 8 June. These convoys were successful in minimising losses, and no escorted ships were sunk off Australia during 1942.

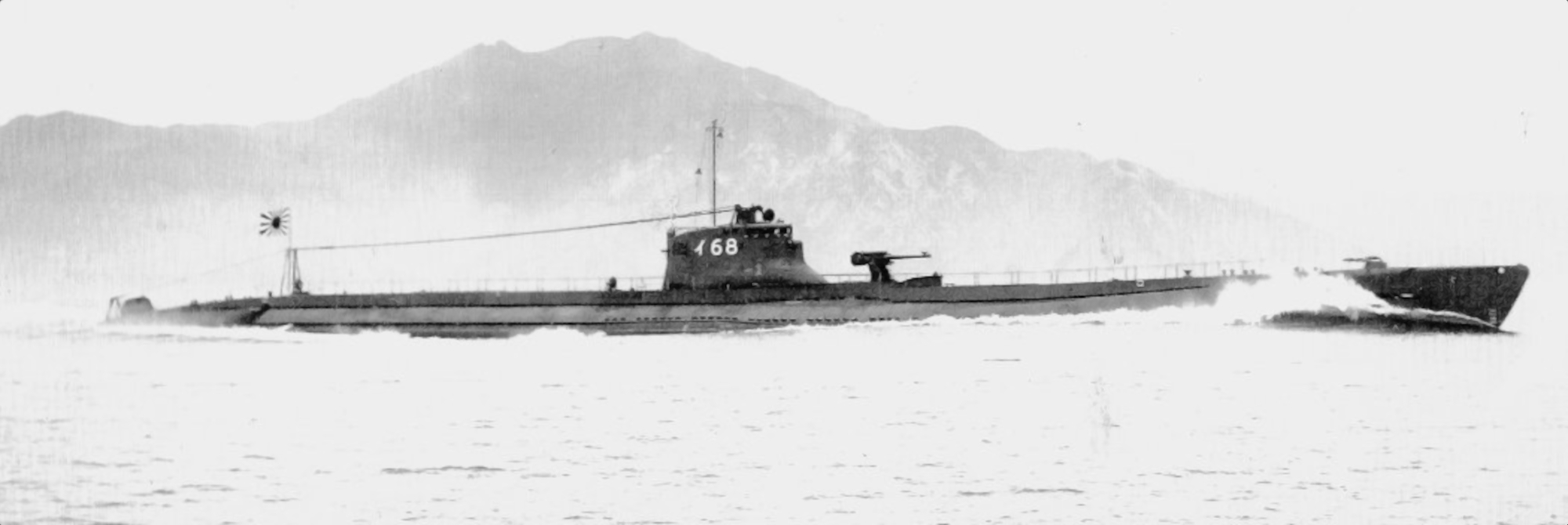
Japanese submarine I-168. I-174 was from the same class.

Japanese submarines resumed operations in Australian waters in January 1943. I-21 made a highly successful patrol in January and February, during which she sank five ships, and two other submarines operated off Sydney and Brisbane in March. A force of five boats from the IJN's 3rd Submarine Squadron subsequently attacked shipping along the full length of the Australian east coast during April and May in an attempt to disrupt the Allied supply line to New Guinea. This marked the peak of the Japanese submarine offensive against Australia and nine ships were sunk off the east coast within a month. In contrast with 1942, several successful attacks were made against ships travelling in convoys.

The large number of Japanese attacks in 1943 put great strain on the Allied forces responsible for protecting shipping off eastern Australia. The Australian naval authorities were forced in April to reduce the number of convoys that sailed so their escort could be increased to at least four warships. The RAAF also greatly increased the number of aircraft allocated to escort convoys and ships sailing independently. Further ships and aircraft fitted for anti-submarine warfare (ASW) became available in May, but were still not adequate to counter the Japanese attacks.

The sinking of the hospital ship AHS Centaur on 14 May 1943 with heavy loss of life led the Advisory War Council to seek information from the RAN and RAAF on the actions being taken to protect shipping. While the RAN acknowledged that the Bathurst-class corvettes that made up most of its escort force were too slow, it argued that the losses suffered by escorted convoys were no worse than those in other parts of the world. Despite the Navy's assurances, Australia's anti-submarine forces were constrained by a shortage of training opportunities and poor coordination between the RAN, RAAF and the United States Navy. The Australian military had also not kept pace with improvements to British and United States ASW doctrine by fully implementing the tactics that had proven most successful in other theatres of the war.

== Attack ==
Location of the attack on Convoy GP55

I-174 departed from the major Japanese naval base at Truk on 16 May 1943 under the command of Lieutenant Nobukiyo Nanbu and arrived off Sandy Cape, Queensland on 27 May. She was the only Japanese boat operating off Australia at the time, as all other available submarines were deployed to counter Allied advances in the Solomon Islands. She made an unsuccessful torpedo attack on the American ship Point San Pedro on 1 June, exchanged gunfire with U.S. Army transport Edward Chambers three days later, and on 5 June was driven off by convoy PG 53's escorts. On 7 June, I-174 fired four torpedoes at the American Liberty ship John Bartram, all of which missed. She sighted another convoy on 13 June, too far away to attack. During this period, she was repeatedly attacked by Allied aircraft and warships, but did not sustain any damage.

Convoy GP55 was assembled in mid-June 1943 as one of at least 69 convoys that sailed from Sydney to Brisbane during 1943. It comprised ten cargo ships and three U.S. Navy Landing Ships, Tank (LST), and was escorted by the Bathurst-class corvettes Warrnambool (which embarked the convoy's senior officer), Bundaberg, Cootamundra, Deloraine and Kalgoorlie. After departing Sydney at 8.45 am on 15 June the convoy maneuvered into five columns, with three ships in each of the centre columns and two in those at the edges. The escorts surrounded the convoy, with four sailing ahead of it and Deloraine to the stern. RAAF Anson and Beaufort aircraft also patrolled over the convoy at all times. U.S. Army transport Portmar, which had been badly damaged in the Bombing of Darwin on 19 February 1942, had difficulty maintaining her position in the convoy and at times straggled behind the other ships.

I-174 sighted Convoy GP55 about 35 nautical miles (65 km) east of Smoky Cape at 4.37 pm on 16 June. The submarine immediately began preparations to attack the Allied ships and easily penetrated the escort screen. At this time Portmar was trying to return to her station and was passing to the port of USS LST-469. This made the ships an ideal target for Nanbu as they overlapped from the viewpoint of his periscope. Accordingly, he fired two torpedoes at them at 5.20 pm. A single torpedo struck the LST near her stern two minutes later, resulting in severe damage and the loss of 26 lives and 17 wounded. Portmar spotted the second torpedo and attempted to evade it but was also struck on her starboard side. The transport's cargo of petrol and ammunition quickly caught fire and she sank within ten minutes. One of her crew and a passenger were killed, and 71 survivors, including four who were injured, were rescued by Deloraine. Despite losing steerage LST-469 remained afloat and was taken under tow by the corvette. I-174's attack on Convoy GP55 was probably the most successful made by a Japanese submarine off Australia.

While Deloraine attended to the torpedoed ships, the other four escorts attempted to locate the Japanese submarine. I-174 had not been detected approaching the convoy, and after the attack the Australian corvettes reversed their courses to conduct a sonar sweep of the area from where she was presumed to have attacked. This was in accordance with tactics that had recently been adopted by the RAN after they proved successful in the Battle of the Atlantic. Warrnambool detected the submarine 23 minutes after the attack, and she and Kalgoorlie subjected I-174 to four depth charge attacks over two hours until contact was lost. An Anson from No. 71 Squadron was escorting the convoy at the time the two ships were torpedoed but was low on fuel and returned to base shortly after the attack. While the corvettes believed that they had sunk I-174, she was only lightly damaged and withdrew to the east. The Australian failure to sink the submarine was due to a lack of practice and too few ships being available to create an adequate search scheme.

After breaking off their attack Warrnambool rejoined the convoy while Kalgoorlie assisted Deloraine in protecting the damaged LST. Deteriorating weather broke the tow-line between Deloraine and LST-469, and instead the corvette proceeded to the nearby town of Coffs Harbour with Portmar's survivors and the LST's wounded personnel. The tugboat HMAS Reserve was dispatched from Brisbane on 16 June to recover the LST and towed her to Sydney, where they arrived on 20 June. LST-469 had been carrying troops and supplies for Operation Chronicle, an amphibious landing at Woodlark and Kiriwina islands on 30 June, and this operation was hindered by her unavailability.

== Aftermath ==
Following the attack, the Australian Chief of Naval Staff, Admiral Sir Guy Royle, judged that the submarine had been damaged and ordered that "special measures" be taken to search for it. The RAAF commenced air searches of an 80-square-nautical-mile (270 km^{2}) box south-east of Coffs Harbour on the night of 16/17 June, while Deloraine, Kalgoorlie and the recently arrived destroyer HMAS Vendetta patrolled the area. On 17 June, Anson aircraft were assigned to patrol the submarine's most likely escape routes in the hope that this would force her to remain submerged during the day and surface at night. Radar-equipped Beauforts relieved the Ansons after dusk and continued the search.

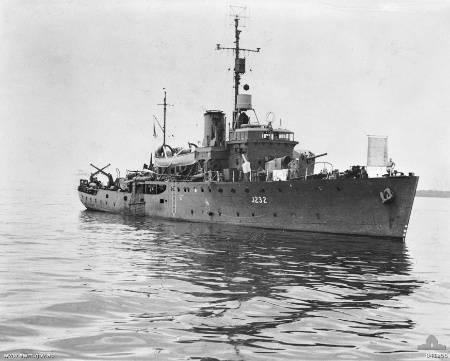
HMAS Deloraine

In the early morning of 18 June, two No. 32 Squadron Beauforts attacked with bombs and gunfire what they took to be a submarine. Deloraine was less than 6 miles (9.7 km) from the area of the RAAF attack, but did not acknowledge repeated attempts by the aircraft to communicate with her. The Beauforts reported that they had damaged the submarine and intensive efforts were made on 19 June to locate and sink her, with twelve Ansons continuously sweeping the area while six Vengeance dive bombers were held in readiness nearby. No further sightings were made and it was assumed that the submarine had been damaged by a No. 32 Squadron aircraft but escaped. Naval historian David Stevens has written that the sighting made on 18 June was probably mistaken, as I-174 was at least 60 miles (97 km) to the east of where the RAAF attack took place and the incident was not recorded in her war diary. However, other historians believe that the Beauforts may have sunk I-178, which was patrolling off the east coast of Australia at the time; this submarine disappeared some time after 17 June 1943, and the cause of her loss has never been confirmed. I-174 was ordered to depart from Australian waters on 20 June, and returned to Truk on 1 July. She did not make contact with any Allied ships or aircraft after attacking GP55.

The seeming failure of the RAAF and RAN to cooperate to finish off a damaged submarine led Royle to order an inquiry into the attack. This found that a breakdown in communication between the two services was the main cause of the failure, with both the aircraft and the naval signal room in Sydney making procedural errors. Rear Admiral Gerard Muirhead-Gould, the naval officer in command of the Sydney region, also noted that communications between the RAN and RAAF were unsatisfactory at higher levels, and that the communication procedures to be used in anti-submarine operations were not well known or understood. In response, he suggested that the RAN establish the position of Commander Escort Vessels Group to organise and command escorts and coordinate their tactics.

The attack on Convoy GP55 was the last attack made by a Japanese submarine on the east coast of Australia. Two submarines were dispatched to operate off Australia in July 1943, but were diverted to the Solomon Islands shortly before reaching the east coast. Following this, the Japanese submarines were fully occupied responding to Allied offensives and transporting supplies to isolated garrisons. As the threat to shipping declined, the RAN ceased running convoys in waters south of Newcastle on 7 December 1943 and Sydney–Brisbane convoys ended on 10 February 1944.
