= HMAS Kalgoorlie =

1941 Bathurst-class corvette

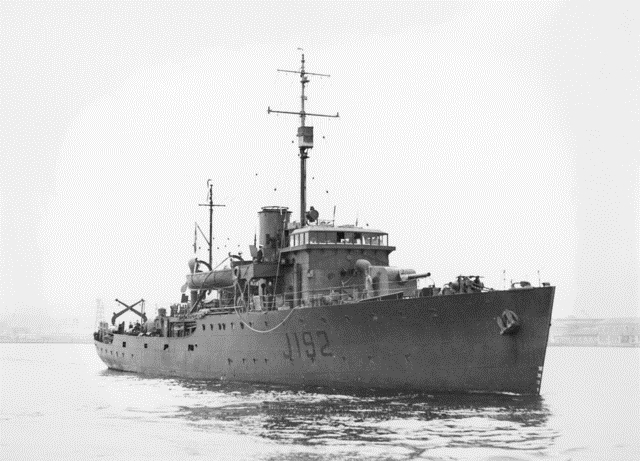
- HMAS Kalgoorlie in Sydney Harbour during World War II

History

Australia
- Namesake: City of Kalgoorlie
- Builder: BHP, Whyalla
- Laid down: 27 July 1940
- Launched: 7 August 1941
- Commissioned: 7 April 1942
- Decommissioned: 8 May 1946
- Honours and awards: Battle honours: Darwin 1942–43; Pacific 1942–43; New Guinea 1943–44; Okinawa 1945
- Fate: Transferred to Royal Netherlands Navy
- Badge

History

Netherlands
- Name: Ternate
- Acquired: 8 May 1946
- Commissioned: 8 May 1946
- Decommissioned: 1958
- Fate: Sold for scrapping 21 September 1961

General characteristics
- Class & type: Bathurst-class corvette
- Displacement: 650 tons (standard), 1,025 tons (full war load)
- Length: 186 ft (57 m)
- Beam: 31 ft (9.4 m)
- Draught: 8.5 ft (2.6 m)
- Propulsion: triple expansion engine, 2 shafts
- Speed: 15 knots (28 km/h; 17 mph) at 1,750 hp
- Complement: 85
- Armament: 1 × 4 inch Mk XIX gun, 3 × Oerlikon 20 mm cannons, 1 × Bofors 40 mm Automatic Gun L/60, Machine guns, Depth charges chutes and throwers

HMAS Kalgoorlie (J192/B245/A119), named for the city of Kalgoorlie, was one of 60 Bathurst-class corvettes constructed during World War II and one of 20 built for the Admiralty but manned by personnel of and commissioned into the Royal Australian Navy (RAN).

== Design and construction ==
In 1938, the Australian Commonwealth Naval Board (ACNB) identified the need for a general purpose 'local defence vessel' capable of both anti-submarine and mine-warfare duties, while easy to construct and operate. The vessel was initially envisaged as having a displacement of approximately 500 tons, a speed of at least 10 knots (19 km/h; 12 mph), and a range of 2,000 nautical miles (3,700 km; 2,300 mi) The opportunity to build a prototype in the place of a cancelled Bar-class boom defence vessel saw the proposed design increased to a 680-ton vessel, with a 15.5 knots (28.7 km/h; 17.8 mph) top speed, and a range of 2,850 nautical miles (5,280 km; 3,280 mi), armed with a 4-inch gun, equipped with asdic, and able to be fitted with either depth charges or minesweeping equipment depending on the planned operations: although closer to a sloop than a local defence vessel, the resulting increased capabilities were accepted due to advantages over British-designed mine warfare and anti-submarine vessels. Construction of the prototype HMAS Kangaroo did not go ahead, but the plans were retained. The need for locally built 'all-rounder' vessels at the start of World War II saw the "Australian Minesweepers" (designated as such to hide their anti-submarine capability, but popularly referred to as "corvettes") approved in September 1939, with 60 constructed during the course of the war: 36 ordered by the RAN, 20 (including Kalgoorlie) ordered by the British Admiralty but manned and commissioned as RAN vessels, and four for the Royal Indian Navy.

Kalgoorlie was laid down by BHP at its Whyalla shipyard on 27 July 1940. She was launched on 7 August 1941 by the wife of Premier of South Australia Thomas Playford IV, and was commissioned into the RAN on 7 April 1942.

== Operational history ==
=== RAN service ===
After completing trials, Kalgoorlie was assigned as a convoy escort. Initially operating along the east coast of Sydney, the corvette was moved to Darwin in August 1942 and taken with convoys between Australia, Thursday Island and Timor. On 25 September, Kalgoorlie and sister ship HMAS Warrnambool evacuated the ship's company of the destroyer HMAS Voyager, which had run aground at Betano Bay two days before. In early December, Kalgoorlie was involved in the search for survivors from her sister ship HMAS Armidale, which had been sunk by Japanese aircraft on 1 December. Kalgoorlie eventually recovered 49 of the survivors.

In April 1943, the corvette returned to the east coast of Australia, still operating as a convoy escort. On 15 June, a thirteen-ship convoy heading for Brisbane and escorted by Kalgoorlie and sister ships HMAS Bundaberg, HMAS Cootamundra, HMAS Deloraine, and HMAS Warrnambool, was attacked off Smoky Cape. The United States Army Transport Portmar and the US Navy Landing ship LST-469 were torpedoed by Japanese submarine I-174: the former sinking in minutes with the loss of only two lives, while 26 were killed aboard the latter ship, which survived and was towed to port. Despite attempts to locate the submarine immediately after the attack, and a multiple-day search performed by Kalgoorlie, I-174 escaped unharmed. This was the last submarine attack to be made on the east coast of Australia during World War II.

Kalgoorlie spent the first half of 1944 as a convoy escort between Queensland and New Guinea, then joined sister ship HMAS Pirie in clearing the minefields laid by HMAS Bungaree throughout the Great Barrier Reef during the early part of the war. During August and September, the two corvettes located and destroyed almost 500 mines. Kalgoorlie spent the rest of the year on convoy escort duties, before joining the British Pacific Fleet at the end of 1944. The corvette operated with the Pacific Fleet until 15 July 1945, when she arrived in Brisbane for a refit. Kalgoorlie was still undergoing refit when the war ended. After the refit, the corvette operated in New Guinea and Australian waters until early May 1946.

The corvette was awarded four battle honours for her wartime service: "Darwin 1942–43", "Pacific 1942–43", "New Guinea 1943–44", and "Okinawa 1945".

Kalgoorlie paid off on 8 May 1946, and was recommissioned on the same day into the Royal Netherlands Navy as HNLMS Ternate. It was scrapped in Japan in 1962.
