= SS Portmar (1919) =

United States-flagged merchant vessel

History
- Name: Centaurus (1919–1930); Portmar (1930–1943)
- Owner: Green Star Line (1919–20); Nafra (1920–23); Planet Steamship Co. (1923–29); Calmar Steamship Co. (1929–42); United States Department of War (1942–43)
- Operator: Green Star Line (1919–20); Nafra (1920–23); Planet Steamship Co. (1923–29); Calmar Steamship Co. (1929–41); Calmar Steamship Co. (WSA Agent) (1941–42); United States Department of War (1942–43)
- Port of registry: United States (1919–29); (United States) New York (1929–43)
- Builder: Northwest Steel
- Yard number: 38
- Launched: 17 November 1919
- Completed: December 1919
- Out of service: 16 June 1943
- Identification: United States Official Number 219283; Code Letters LTVH (1919–34); Call sign KOPZ (1934–43)
- Fate: Sunk, 16 June 1943

General characteristics
- Class & type: Design 1013 ship
- Type: Cargo ship
- Tonnage: 5,551 GRT; 3,418 NRT; 8,800 DWT
- Length: 409.8 feet (124.91 m)
- Beam: 56.2 feet (17.13 m)
- Draft: 30.2 feet (9.20 m)
- Depth: 27.7 feet (8.44 m)
- Installed power: Triple expansion steam engine, 582 NHP
- Propulsion: Screw propeller
- Notes: Laid down as West Minsi

Portmar was a United States-flagged merchant vessel that was constructed in response to World War I, operated by a succession of companies in the interwar period, then taken up for wartime shipping in World War II.

The ship was built to Design 1013, as part of wartime orders by the United States Shipping Board (USSB). She was laid down by Northwest Steel of Portland, Oregon, with the name West Minsi. The USSB order was cancelled during construction, but Northwest Steel completed the ship for private sale. She was sold to the Green Star Line before launching in November 1919, and was assigned the name Centaurus. The freighter was sold to Nafra in 1920, then on to the Planet Steamship Company in 1923. In 1929, the ship was sold to the Calmar Steamship Company, who renamed the ship Portmar.

In late 1941, Portmar was chartered by the United States Department of War to carry supplies to the Philippines but due to the Japanese invasion of the Philippines was retained in Australia. She was used in February 1942 to carry reinforcements from Darwin for the defenders of Timor prior to the Japanese invasion. The reinforcement convoy was shadowed by Japanese planes and attacked, forcing its cancellation. Portmar returned to Darwin on 18 February, and was still in harbour the next day when Japanese carrier-based aircraft attacked the city in the first ever attack on Australia. The ship was heavily damaged, and run aground to prevent sinking.

Portmar was later refloated, towed to Sydney, repaired, purchased by the United States Army and put back into service as an Army transport. In June 1943, she sailed as part of convoy GP55. On 15 June, off Smoky Cape, Portmar and the landing ship USS LST-469 were torpedoed by the Japanese submarine I-174. Due to a highly volatile cargo, Portmar was abandoned and sank in less than ten minutes. She was the last ship lost to the Japanese submarine campaign in Australian waters.

== Design and construction ==
The ship was built to Design 1013 or the "Robert Dollar type", a standardised freighter design ordered by the United States Shipping Board (USSB) from multiple west-coast shipyards during World War I. Standard dimensions were 410.5 feet (125.1 m) in length, with a beam of 54 feet (16 m) and a standard draft of 30 feet (9.1 m). This vessel varied a little from the standard, being 409.8 feet (124.91 m) long and 54.2 feet (16.52 m) beam. Depth was 27.7 feet (8.44 m) with a draft of 30.2 feet (9.20 m).

They had a deadweight tonnage value of 8,800, and a gross register tonnage of 5,551. Her net register tonnage was 3,418. Propulsion machinery varied across the type: this ship used oil-fuelled boilers, connected to triple-expansion steam engines. The engine was built by the Hooven, Owens & Rentschler Company of Hamilton, Ohio. It had cylinders of 24.5 inches (62 cm), 41.5 inches (105 cm) and 68 inches (170 cm) diameter by 48 inches (120 cm) stroke. It was rated at 582 NHP. One hundred and five vessels were completed for the USSB, while this ship and four others were cancelled but completed and sold privately by the shipyards, and others cancelled outright.

The ship was laid down by Northwest Steel of Portland, Oregon as yard number 38 and USSB number 2373, with the name West Minsi. During construction, the order for this ship was cancelled by the USSB Emergency Fleet Corporation, but construction continued for private sale. By the time the ship was launched on 17 November 1919, she had been sold to the Green Star Line and assigned the name Centaurus. The ship was completed in December 1919, and assigned the United States official number 219283 and Code Letters LTVH.

== Operational history ==
The first voyage of Centaurus departed from Astoria, Oregon in late December 1919, bound for Callao, Peru. During the voyage, one of the crewmen suffered a mental breakdown over concerns about his invalid passport. Instead of providing medical assistance, the sailor was placed in irons, removed from the crew list and relisted as a stowaway, then abandoned on the dockside when Centaurus departed Callao on 17 January 1920. The crewman ended up in an insane asylum, where he died later that year.

- 18 January 1920. The newspaper "The Sunday Oregonian", Portland, wrote on the page 46:

GREEN STAR WILL PLY ATLANTIC
Four Steamers Purchased Here to Sail From Baltimore.
ORIENTAL RUN PROMISED
Cruft Now Being Built at Standifer Plant Expected to Be Operated on Pacific.
Speculation as to the future field of operations of the Green Star Steamship company, which purchased four steel steamers in Portland and placed orders for the construction of five more, was ended last week by a formal announcement from the headquarters of the company in Baltimore, where the Green Star line has pur chased a large building to serve as a home for its shipping enterprises. The last of the steamers purchased by, the line here, the Circlnus, sailed from Astoria Wednesday with a full cargo of lumber for Melbourne and Adelaide, Australia. This cargo amounted to 4.086,103 feet, it is reported by Brown & McCabe, stevedores, who had charge of loading the vessel.
The three other steamers purchased here by the Green Star line are the Corvus, which went in ballast to Arica, Chile, to load nitrates for Europe; the Centaurus, which took a part cargo of lumber here and went to San Francisco to finish a general cargo for the west coast, and the Clauseus, which went from here to San Francisco in ballast to load beans for Hamburg.[10][11]

Later in 1920, Centaurus was sold to Nafra Company which was affiliated with Green Star having intertwined financial affairs in ship acquisition. She operated for this company until 1923, when she was sold to the Planet Steamship Company. In December 1929, Centaurus and four other Planet freighters (Circinius, Corvus, Clauseus, and Eurana) were sold to the Calmar Steamship Company.

- 13 of December 1929. The newspaper "Oakland Tribune" in Oakland, California, wrote:

Isthmian Lines House Flag from 1910 to 1974.

  "CALMAR BUYS SHIPS.
  The "Calmar Line" has purchased five freighters from the "Planet Steamship company", according to announcement from New York. This purchase increases the Calmar intercoastal fleet to eleven ships. The new craft are 880 tons register.
  The vessels involved are all well known on this coast, consisting of the Circinius, Corvus, Clauseus, Centaurus and Eurana. They have run into local ports for several years under the Isthmian Line houseflag".[13][14]

Centaurus was renamed Portmar, and her port of registry was changed to New York. In 1934, her Code Letters were changed to KOPZ. On 13 July 1937, while on a voyage from Boston, Massachusetts to Philadelphia, Pennsylvania, Portmar collided with the Handkerchief Lightvessel in dense fog. Although she was undamaged, the lightvessel was severely damaged.

=== World War II ===
On 18 November 1941, Portmar and seven other ships (Iowan, Mauna Loa, West Camargo, Steel Voyager, Jane Christenson, F. J. Luckenbach, and Malama) were chartered by the United States Department of War to carry military supplies to the Philippines. The ship was effectively delivered to the United States government on 20 November 1941 in what was a precursor of the delivery of all ocean merchant shipping to the War Shipping Administration with allocation to the Army. Even though details of the charters were deemed confidential, the names of all eight ships were published in the Los Angeles Times two days later. The Japanese invasion of the Philippines resulted in retention in Australia. Portmar had arrived in Australia as one of the ships carrying fuel and vehicles after the earlier arrival of the diverted Pensacola convoy. Portmar had departed San Francisco 26 November 1941 sailing independently with 319 vehicles, 5,939 barrels of gasoline, ammunition, bombs, machine guns and other stores for the units sailing in the Pensacola convoy but was diverted while south of Hawaii, first to Suva then to Sydney with arrival there 31 December 1941.

The ship was one of those initially chosen to attempt to run the Japanese blockade of the Philippines but the rapid Japanese advance and occupation of Rabaul, Kavieng and other strategic points to the north resulted in the ship being recalled to Darwin. The Maritime Commission was expecting Portmar along with other large vessels to be returned to the United States but the desperate need for shipping in theater had made local retention necessary.

Before 02:00 on 15 February 1942, Portmar sailed from Darwin as part of a convoy carrying reinforcements for the defenders of Timor. Also in the convoy were the transports USAT Meigs, Mauna Loa, and Tulagi, with an escort made up of the cruiser USS Houston, the destroyer USS Peary, and the sloops HMAS Warrego and HMAS Swan. Portmar, along with Tulagi, carried elements of the U.S. Army 148th Field Artillery while the other ships had Australian forces embarked. By 11:00, the ships had been spotted by a Japanese flying boat, which followed them for several hours before dropping bombs at around 14:00 with minimal effect. The next day, another flying boat began shadowing the convoy around 09:15, and the ships were attacked by a force of 45 Japanese aircraft two hours later. Light damage and some casualties were suffered aboard Manua Loa, while Portmar was not damaged during the hour-long attack. The likelihood of further attacks and the believed imminent invasion of Timor resulted in orders to turn the convoy around received at 15:15, with all ships back at Darwin by midday on 18 February.

Portmar beached after attack on Darwin.

Portmar was still in Darwin Harbour the next day when a force of Japanese carrier-based aircraft attacked the city: the first time Australia had been attacked. She was heavily damaged during the attack, and was towed away from her mooring and run aground to prevent her from sinking. One of the crew was killed, and several wounded were later recovered by the examination vessel HMAS Southern Cross.

Portmar was salvaged and reconditioned by U.S. Army port-battalion troops, towed to Sydney, and repaired. The ship was purchased at Brisbane by the War Department on 17 November 1942 and incorporated into the U.S. Army's permanent local fleet as an Army transport.

On the morning of 15 June 1943, USAT Portmar, loaded with ammunition and fuel, left Sydney for Brisbane as part of convoy GP55. The convoy consisted of ten merchant ships (including Portmar) and three Landing Ship Tank vessels, escorted by the Bathurst-class corvettes HMAS Bundaberg, HMAS Cootamundra, HMAS Deloraine, HMAS Kalgoorlie, and HMAS Warrnambool. Portmar was the middle of three ships in the fourth column. Portmar had trouble maintaining position during the voyage, and at 17:15 on 16 June, when the convoy was 35 nautical miles (65 km; 40 mi) east of Smoky Cape, was passing to port of USS LST-469 to regain convoy position. At this time, the Japanese submarine I-174 fired a spread of torpedoes at the convoy from the convoy's starboard: one torpedo struck USS LST-469, and another hit Portmar almost immediately after. The volatile cargo was ignited, and the order was given to abandon ship. Portmar sank ten minutes later, with two crewmen killed. The 71 survivors were recovered by HMAS Deloraine, which then took USS LST-469 (which had survived the attack, but was immobilised and had suffered heavy casualties) in tow, and headed for Coffs Harbour. Warrnambool and Kalgoorlie depth-charged the area until contact was lost: they were unable to damage I-174, nor were subsequent searches able to locate her. The attack on convoy GP55 was the last Japanese submarine attack in Australian waters. The loss of shipping, particularly the LST that was part of MacArthur's Seventh Amphibious Force, forced removal of troops and supplies for the occupation of Kiriwina and Woodlark Island, the first offensive amphibious operations.
