= Japanese submarine I-174 =

Kaidai type cruiser submarine

History

Empire of Japan
- Name: I-74
- Ordered: 1934
- Builder: Sasebo Naval Arsenal, Sasebo, Japan
- Laid down: 16 October 1934
- Launched: 28 March 1938
- Commissioned: 15 August 1938
- Renamed: I-174 on 20 May 1942
- Fate: Sunk 12 April 1944
- Stricken: 10 June 1944

General characteristics
- Class & type: Kaidai type (KD6B Type)
- Displacement: 1,839 tonnes (1,810 long tons) surfaced; 2,605 tonnes (2,564 long tons) submerged
- Length: 105 m (344 ft 6 in)
- Beam: 8.2 m (26 ft 11 in)
- Draft: 4.57 m (15 ft 0 in)
- Installed power: 9,000 bhp (6,700 kW) (diesels); 1,800 hp (1,300 kW) (electric motors)
- Propulsion: Diesel-electric; 2 × diesel engines; 2 × electric motors
- Speed: 23 knots (43 km/h; 26 mph) surfaced; 8 knots (15 km/h; 9.2 mph) submerged
- Range: 10,000 nmi (19,000 km; 12,000 mi) at 16 knots (30 km/h; 18 mph) surfaced; 65 nmi (120 km; 75 mi) at 3 knots (5.6 km/h; 3.5 mph) submerged
- Test depth: 75 m (246 ft)
- Complement: 70
- Armament: 6 × 533 mm (21 in) torpedo tubes (4 bow, 2 stern); 1 × 120 mm (4.7 in) deck gun; 2 × single 13.2 mm (0.52 in) anti-aircraft machinegun

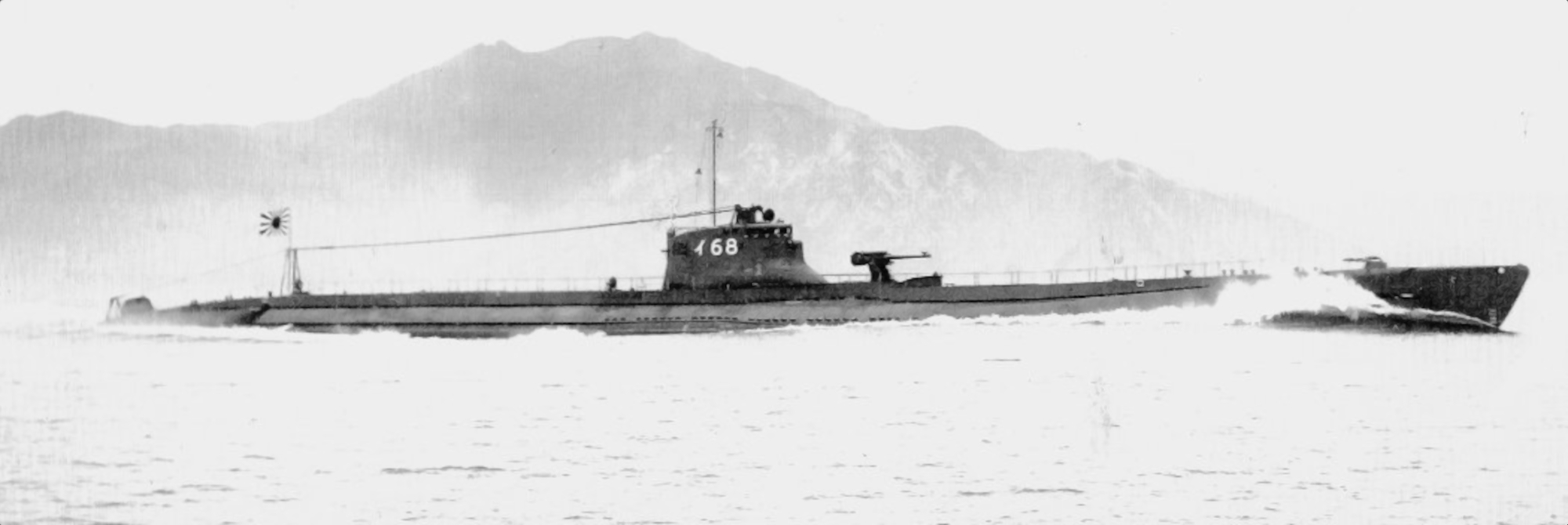
An image of the I-68

I-74, later I-174, was an Imperial Japanese Navy Kaidai type cruiser submarine of the KD6B sub-class commissioned in 1938. During World War II, she took part in the attack on Pearl Harbor, the Battle of Midway, the Guadalcanal campaign, the New Guinea campaign, and the Gilbert and Marshall Islands campaign and operated off Australia before she was sunk during her ninth war patrol in 1944.

== Design and description ==
The submarines of the KD6B sub-class were essentially repeats of the preceding KD6A sub-class. They displaced 1,814 tonnes (1,785 long tons) surfaced and 2,605 tonnes (2,564 long tons) submerged. The submarines were 105 meters (344 ft 6 in) long, had a beam of 8.2 meters (26 ft 11 in) and a draft of 4.57 meters (15 ft 0 in). They had a diving depth of 75 metres (246 ft)

For surface running, the submarines were powered by two 4,500-brake-horsepower (3,356 kW) diesel engines, each driving one propeller shaft. When submerged each propeller was driven by a 900-horsepower (671 kW) electric motor. The submarines could reach 23 knots (43 km/h; 26 mph) on the surface and 8 knots (15 km/h; 9.2 mph) underwater. On the surface, the KD3Bs had a range of 10,000 nautical miles (19,000 km; 12,000 mi) at 16 knots (30 km/h; 18 mph); submerged, they had a range of 65 nmi (120 km; 75 mi) at 3 knots (5.6 km/h; 3.5 mph).

The submarines were armed with six internal 53.3 cm (21.0 in) torpedo tubes, four in the bow and two in the stern. They carried a total of 14 torpedoes. They were also armed with one 120 mm (4.7 in) deck gun and two 13.2 mm (0.52 in) Hotchkiss M1929 anti-aircraft machine guns.

== Construction and commissioning ==
The submarine that would become I-74 was laid down on 16 October 1934 at the Sasebo Naval Arsenal in Sasebo, Japan. Launched on 28 March 1937, she was numbered I-74 on 1 June 1938. She was completed and commissioned on 15 August 1938.

== Service history ==
=== Pre-World War II ===
On the day of her commissioning, I-74 was attached to the Kure Naval District and assigned to Submarine Division 11 in Submarine Squadron 2 in the 2nd Fleet, a component of the Combined Fleet. On 15 November 1939, her division was transferred to Submarine Squadron 3, also in the 2nd Fleet. I-74 departed Okinawa on 27 March 1940 in company with the submarines I-68, I-69, I-70, I-73, and I-75 for a training cruise in southern Chinese waters, completing it when the six submarines arrived at Takao, Formosa, on 2 April 1940. On 11 October 1940, I-74 was one of 98 Imperial Japanese Navy ships that gathered along with more than 500 aircraft on the Japanese coast at Yokohama Bay for an Imperial fleet review — the largest fleet review in Japanese history — in honor of the 2,600th anniversary of the enthronement of the Emperor Jimmu, Japan's legendary first emperor. On 15 November 1940, Submarine Squadron 3 was reassigned to the 6th Fleet, a component of the Combined Fleet.

On 11 November 1941, the 6th Fleet's commander, Vice Admiral Mitsumi Shimizu, held a meeting with the commanding officers of the submarines of Submarine Squadron 3 aboard his flagship, the light cruiser Katori, and his chief of staff briefed them on plans for Operation Z, the upcoming surprise attack on Pearl Harbor in Hawaii. The attack would begin the Pacific campaign and bring Japan and the United States into World War II.

As Japanese military forces began to deploy for the opening Japanese offensive of the war, I-74 departed Saeki Bay on the coast of Kyushu on 11 November 1941 in company with I-75 bound for Kwajalein Atoll, which the two submarines reached on 20 November 1941. Assigned to support Operation Z, I-74 got underway from Kwajalein on 23 November 1941 with the commander of Submarine Division 11 embarked and set course for the Hawaiian Islands. While she was en route, she received the message "Climb Mount Niitaka 1208" (Japanese: Niitakayama nobore 1208) from the Combined Fleet on 2 December 1941, indicating that war with the Allies would commence on 8 December 1941 Japan time, which was on 7 December 1941 on the other side of the International Date Line in Hawaii. She arrived south of Oahu on 4 December 1941.

=== World War II ===
==== First war patrol ====
When the attack on Pearl Harbor took place on the morning of 7 December 1941, the submarines of Submarine Squadron 3 were deployed south of Oahu, with I-74 assigned lifeguard duty south of Niihau. Japanese pilots unable to return to their aircraft carriers after the attack due to injury, damage, or lack of fuel were instructed to land their aircraft on Niihau, from which I-74 would recover them. By the time two damaged Mitsubishi A6M2 Zero (Allied reporting name "Zeke") fighters — one each from the aircraft carriers Hiryū and Sōryū — arrived over Niihau on 7 December, however, I-74 already had received orders to conclude her lifeguard duties and had departed the area. The Sōryū pilot opted to commit suicide by diving his plane into the sea, but the Hiryū pilot crash-landed on Niihau and terrorized the island's population — in what became known as the Niihau Incident — until he was killed on 13 December 1941.

I-74 departed the Hawaiian Islands area on 17 December 1941 and made for Kingman Reef in the northern Line Islands to investigate a reported U.S. naval base there. She reconnoitered Kingman Reef from 23 to 25 December 1941, but found no sign of a base. She then proceeded to Kwajalein, which she reached on 31 December 1941.

==== January–April 1942 ====
I-74 and I-75 got underway from Kwajalein on 13 January 1942 and headed north, passing Midway Atoll in the Northwestern Hawaiian Islands on their way to the Aleutian Islands. From the Aleutians, the two submarines made their way to Yokosuka, Japan, where they arrived on 19 February 1942.

==== Second war patrol ====
I-74′s stay in Japan ended on 15 April 1942, when she began her second war patrol, departing Kure in company with I-75 to form a patrol line east of Japan. While she was at sea, 16 United States Army Air Forces B-25 Mitchell bombers launched by the aircraft carrier USS Hornet (CV-8) struck targets on Honshu in the Doolittle Raid on 18 April 1942. In support of the raid, United States Navy F4F Wildcat fighters and SBD Dauntless dive bombers from the aircraft carrier USS Enterprise (CV-6) attacked Japanese vessels forming a picket line in the North Pacific Ocean in the approaches to Japan. I-74 rescued the crew members of the guard boat Iwate Maru No. 1 — which sank on 19 April 1942 due to damage suffered on 18 April — and transferred them to the light cruiser Kiso on 23 April. I-74 and I-75 concluded their patrol with their arrival at Kwajalein on 10 May 1942.

==== Midway operation ====
On 20 May 1942, I-74 was renumbered I-174 and I-75 became I-175. The two submarines departed Kwajalein in company that day to participate in Operation MI, the planned Japanese invasion of Midway Atoll. Plans called for them first to support a preliminary phase of the Midway operation, Operation K-2, which called for the Japanese submarines I-121 and I-123 to refuel two Kawanishi H8K (Allied reporting name "Emily") flying boats at the French Frigate Shoals in the Northwestern Hawaiian Islands so that the two aircraft could conduct a reconnaissance flight over Pearl Harbor, while I-174 patrolled south of Pearl Harbor to rescue the crews of the aircraft if they were shot down. I-174 arrived at her lifeguard station 20 nautical miles (37 km; 23 mi) southeast of Oahu on 29 May 1942. The aircraft were scheduled to arrive at the French Frigate Shoals on 30 May 1942 and make their Pearl Harbor flight on 31 May. When I-123 arrived off the French Frigate Shoals on 29 May 1942, however, she found the U.S. Navy seaplane tenders USS Ballard (AVD-10) and USS Thornton (AVD-11) already operating flying boats there. She radioed her news of this sighting after she surfaced that night, and the reconnaissance flight was postponed for a day. When I-123 again observed the French Frigate Shoals on 31 May, she found the American ships still there and noted U.S. Navy flying boats landing in the lagoon, and this news resulted in the Japanese concluding that the U.S. Navy was using the atoll as a base. The Japanese decided to cancel the reconnaissance flights entirely.

With their supporting mission for the aircraft cancelled, I-174 and I-175 took patrol stations in support of the scheduled invasion of Midway. The Battle of Midway began on 4 June 1942, and it ended on 7 June 1942 in a decisive Japanese defeat. The Japanese cancelled the invasion of Midway. I-174 made no contact with enemy forces during the battle and concluded her patrol with her arrival at Kwajalein on 20 June 1942.

==== Third, fourth, fifth, and sixth war patrols ====
I-174 set out from Kwajalein on her third war patrol on 9 July 1942, tasked with conducting a reconnaissance of the Port Moresby, New Guinea, area. Soon after she departed an oil leak developed, forcing her to abort the patrol and proceed to Rabaul on New Ireland in the Bismarck Archipelago for repairs. She reached Rabaul on 23 July 1942.

With her repairs completed during an overnight stay, I-174 got back underway from Rabaul on 24 July 1942 to commence her fourth war patrol, assigned a patrol area off the east coast of Australia in the vicinity of Sydney. She also operated in the Nouméa area. While I-174 was on patrol, the Guadalcanal campaign began with United States Marine Corps landings on Guadalcanal in the southeastern Solomon Islands on 7 August 1942, so I-174 moved to the Solomons in response. The patrol was uneventful, and she returned to Rabaul on 17 August 1942.

I-174 set out from Rabaul on her fifth war patrol with I-175 and the submarine I-11 to patrol southwest of Rennell Island and southeast of San Cristobal in the southeastern Solomon Islands. The patrol passed quietly, and she concluded it with her arrival at Truk Atoll in the Caroline Islands on 22 September 1942.

After repairs, I-174 got underway from Truk in company with I-175 on 16 October 1942 for her sixth war patrol, ordered to operate in the Indispensable Reefs area south of Rennell Island as part of the B Group, a patrol line which also included I-175 and the submarines I-9, I-15, I-21, and I-24. She again saw no action, and she returned to Truk on 4 November 1942 for further repairs.

==== November 1942–May 1943 ====
I-174 departed Truk on 6 November 1942 bound for Kure, where she arrived on 12 November 1942 to undergo an overhaul. During her stay in Japan, Submarine Division 11 was disbanded on 15 March 1943 and she was reassigned that day to Submarine Division 12, which also was a part of Submarine Squadron 3. After completion of her overhaul, she got underway from Kure on 5 May 1943 bound for Truk, which she reached on 11 May 1943.

==== Seventh war patrol ====
At 17:00 on 16 May 1943, I-174 departed Truk for her seventh war patrol, assigned a patrol area off the east coast of Australia. She arrived at a point 30 nautical miles (56 km; 35 mi) off Sandy Cape — the northernment point of Fraser Island off the coast of Queensland, Australia — on 27 May 1943. At 03:20 on 28 May 1943, a Bristol Beaufort of the Royal Australian Air Force′s (RAAF's) No. 32 Squadron detected her on radar at a range of 4.5 nautical miles (8.3 km; 5.2 mi) and closed with her. The aircraft's crew sighted her at a range of 600 yards (550 m), but she crash-dived and escaped.

I-174 was 70 nautical miles (130 km; 81 mi) east of Brisbane, Australia, late on the morning of 1 June 1943 when she sighted what she identified as a 6,000-gross register ton merchant ship. In fact, the vessel was the 3,303- or 3,306-gross register ton (according to different sources) American cargo ship Point San Pedro, which was nearing the end of a voyage from Balboa in the Panama Canal Zone to Brisbane. I-174 fired four torpedoes at 11:36, and at 11:38 lookouts aboard Point San Pedro sighted two of them passing the ship. All four torpedoes missed, and within an hour an Avro Anson of the RAAF's No. 71 Squadron took off from Lowood, Queensland. to search for I-174. By 2 June 1943, six Ansons from Lowood and four from Coffs Harbour, New South Wales, were involved in the search, but none of the aircraft found I-174.

While submerged off Brisbane on 3 June 1943, I-174 sighted a northbound Allied convoy of at least six transports escorted by three destroyers at a range of 16,250 yards (14,860 m). She surfaced at 18:00 and gave chase, but was forced to discontinue the pursuit and submerge when corvettes at the rear of the convoy turned toward her. The convoy escaped.

I-174 was submerged off Cape Moreton at the northeastern tip of Moreton Island off South East Queensland, Australia, at 08:45 on 4 June 1943 when she sighted the 4,113-gross register ton United States Army Transport USAT Edward Chambers, which was on a voyage from Balboa, Panama Canal Zone, to Brisbane. Unable to close with Edward Chambers to achieve an attack position while submerged, I-174 surfaced and opened fire with her 120-millimeter (4.7 in) deck gun. I-174 fired nine rounds, all of which missed, before return fire by Edward Chambers — which responded with 12 rounds from her after 3-inch (76 mm) gun — forced I-174 to break off the action and submerge. An RAAF Beaufort of No. 32 Squadron took off to search for I-174, but failed to find her. Upon receiving a distress signal from Edward Chambers, the Royal Australian Navy minesweeper corvette HMAS Bendigo, which was escorting Convoy PG53 11 nautical miles (20 km; 13 mi) to the northeast of Edward Chambers, detached from the convoy to investigate, while the convoy itself diverted 15 nautical miles (28 km; 17 mi) to seaward to avoid I-174. Five more Ansons from Lowood also joined the search, forcing I-174 to remain submerged for the rest of the day. She headed south in the late afternoon.

At 10:25 on 5 June 1943, I-174 was 60 nautical miles (110 km; 69 mi) northeast of Coffs Harbour when she detected the propeller noises of Convoy PG53 at a range of 13,000 yards (11,900 m). Taking advantage of bad weather and poor visibility, she surfaced at 12:55 and closed to only 1,600 yards (1,500 m) behind the convoy's rearmost ships. She attempted to further close the range, but Allied patrol aircraft appeared twice, forcing her to submerge for 20 to 25 minutes each time before surfacing to resume her pursuit of the convoy. At sunset, however, she still was in contact with the convoy and 6,000 meters (6,600 yd) astern of it. By 20:22, she was 5,000 yards (4,600 m) off the convoy's starboard side, and when she reached a position 4,000 yards (3,700 m) off its starboard beam, she began to set up an attack, but a destroyer ahead of the convoy turned toward her and forced her to dive. She resurfaced at 21:45 and again closed for an attack, only to have an escort force her to dive again. When she again surfaced she began a high-speed run to get ahead of the convoy and reach its estimated position at daybreak. Upon reaching this position, she submerged to await the convoy's approach, but when she surfaced at dawn on 6 June 1943 she found herself 21,500 yards (19,700 m) off the convoy's port quarter. Given the long range and the likelihood of encountering Allied patrol aircraft in daylight, she discontinued the pursuit and continued south, arriving off Newcastle, New South Wales, at 19:00.

I-174 was 100 nautical miles (190 km; 120 mi) east of Sydney at 04:50 on 7 June 1943 when she sighted the 7,176-gross register ton American Liberty ship SS John Bartram, which was nearing the end of a voyage from San Francisco, California, to Sydney. As John Bertram zigzagged, I-174 closed the range and worked into a position of ahead of her to set up a dawn attack. I-174 fired four torpedoes at 06:06, and John Bertram′s lookouts saw two of them pass half a ship's length ahead of her at 06:10. John Bertram′s crew then heard and felt a heavy underwater explosion, while I-174's crew heard the explosion of two torpedoes. I-174′s commanding officer then observed the undamaged John Bertram through I-174′s periscope and mistakenly thought she was listing. When a third torpedo exploded, I-174′s commanding officer mistook it for a depth charge explosion and ordered I-174 to go deep. I-174′s crew heard John Bertram′s engines stop and believed that they had sunk her, but in fact John Bertram survived the encounter unharmed.

After the attack on John Bertram, I-174 headed east. During the evening of 7 June 1943, she sighted a vessel which dropped two depth charges nearby. She then proceeded to the south. During the evening of 9 June 1943, she reached the southern limit of her assigned operating area in the Tasman Sea. She found no ships until 13 June 1943, when at 14:00 she sighted an Allied convoy of at least six transports escorted by two destroyers 30 nautical miles (56 km; 35 mi) east of Wollongong Light, but the convoy was too distant for her to attack and it steamed away to the north. She surfaced at 18:40, but spotted an Allied warship and submerged again.

A Beaufort from Coffs Harbour gained radar contact on I-174 at 22:50 on 14 June 1943, then sighted a large wake she was leaving behind her. The aircraft bombed I-174, but missed, and I-174 crash-dived and remained submerged for 35 minutes. The Beaufort loitered in the area, and made another attack only moments after I-174 resurfaced, the bombs landing close aboard on her port side. I-174 crash-dived again, this time remaining underwater for 25 minutes before returning to the surface.

At 01:00 on 16 June 1943, I-174 arrived off Smoky Cape on the coast of New South Wales southeast of Coffs Harbour. At 16:37 she sighted Convoy GP55, which consisted of ten cargo ships and three tank landing ships escorted by the Royal Australian Navy corvettes HMAS Kalgoorlie, HMAS Warrnambool, HMAS Deloraine, HMAS Bundaberg, and HMAS Cootamundra. After penetrating the escort screen, I-174 fired two torpedoes at two overlapping transports, which her commanding officer estimated as of 8,000 and 10,000 gross register tons. One torpedo struck the 5,000-displacement ton U.S. Navy tank landing ship USS LST-469 in her starboard side aft, killing 26 men and wrecking the vessel's steering gear. Moments later, lookouts aboard the 5,551-gross register ton U.S. Army Transport USAT Portmar, which was loaded with fuel and ammunition, sighted the second torpedo approaching. Portmar began a hard turn to port, but the torpedo hit her in her starboard side in her No. 1 hold before she could answer her helm. Her cargo of gasoline exploded, setting her on fire from stem to stern almost immediately, and her cargo of ammunition exploded shortly afterward. Seven minutes after the torpedo hit, Portmar′s crew abandoned ship and she sank at 30°59′S 153°48′E, the last ship sunk by a Japanese submarine off Australia′s east coast. I-174′s commanding officer believed that she had sunk both ships. In fact, LST-469 remained afloat and was towed to Sydney for repairs, although her damage made her unavailable for Operation Chronicle, the Allied landings on Woodlark Island and Kiriwina on 30 June 1943, and forced a reduction in the number of troops and amount of cargo committed to the landings. Kalgoorlie and Warrnambool pursued I-174 and attacked her with depth charges, but she escaped.

On 20 June 1943, I-174 received orders to terminate her patrol and return to Truk via a route that took her east of the Solomon Islands. She sighted no other vessels or aircraft during her return voyage, and she reached Truk on 1 July 1943.

==== New Guinea campaign ====
Assigned to support Japanese forces fighting in the New Guinea campaign by making supply runs between Rabaul and New Guinea, I-174 departed Truk on 9 August 1943 bound for Rabaul, where she arrived on 13 August 1943. She began her first supply run with her departure from Rabaul on 31 August 1943, called at Lae, New Guinea, on 2 September 1943, unloaded her cargo, and got back underway the same day to return to Rabaul. Allied aircraft pursued her during the return voyage, but she arrived safely at Rabaul on 4 September 1943.

With the new commanding officer of the Imperial Japanese Navy's 7th Base Unit, Rear Admiral Kunio Mori, aboard as a passenger, I-174 left Rabaul on her second supply run on 7 September 1943. She called at Lae on 9 September 1943 to disembark Mori and unload her cargo. After embarking the outgoing 7th Base Unit commanding officer, Rear Admiral Ruitaro Fujita, as well as Imperial Japanese Army staff officers and 30 sick Imperial Japanese Army soldiers, she got back underway the same day bound for Rabaul. During her return voyage, an Allied destroyer attacked her on 10 September 1943, dropping 26 depth charges. When her oxygen supply was nearly exhausted, I-174 surfaced to fight it out with the destroyer, but found no Allied ships in sight and proceeded with her voyage. As she neared Rabaul, a United States Army Air Forces B-17 Flying Fortress attacked her on 12 September 1943, dropping several bombs which landed close aboard but inflicted no significant damage. She arrived at Rabaul later on 12 September. During her stay there, Submarine Squadron 3 was disbanded on 15 September 1943, and I-174's Submarine Division 12 was assigned directly to 6th Fleet Headquarters.

I-174 began her third New Guinea supply run on 19 September 1943, departing Rabaul bound for Finschhafen. She called at Finschhafen on 21 September, and after unloading her cargo departed the same day for her return to Rabaul. During her return voyage, the Australian Army's 20th Brigade landed at Finschhafen as part of the Huon Peninsula campaign, and I-174 received orders to divert from her voyage to attack Task Force 76, the naval task force supporting the landing. She did not succeed in attacking the task force, and returned to Rabaul on 24 September 1943.

I-174 set out on her fourth and final New Guinea supply run on 29 September 1943, leaving Rabaul to deliver supplies to Sio. The first Japanese submarine to supply Sio, she arrived there on 1 October 1943 and discharged her cargo. She then called at Rabaul from 3 to 11 October 1943 before proceeding to Truk, which she reached on 16 October 1943.

==== Eighth war patrol ====
The U.S. offensive phase of the Gilbert and Marshall Islands campaign began on 20 November 1943 with the U.S. landings on Tarawa, beginning the Battle of Tarawa, and on Butaritari (erroneously referred to as "Makin Atoll" by U.S. forces), beginning the Battle of Makin. In response, the commander of the 6th Fleet, Vice Admiral Takeo Takagi, ordered I-174, I-175, and the submarines I-19, I-21, I-35, I-39, I-40, I-169, and Ro-38 to attack the U.S. landing force. Accordingly, I-174 put to sea from Truk on 24 November 1943 to begin her eighth war patrol, with orders to form part of a submarine patrol line northwest of Butaritari. On 1 December 1943, an Imperial Japanese Navy Air Service patrol aircraft reported an Allied convoy of six transports escorted by three battleships headed toward Butaritari, and Takagi ordered I-21 and I-174 to intercept and attack it, but I-21 probably had been sunk on 29 November, and I-174 did not find the convoy.

On the night of 6 December 1943, I-174 was on the surface charging her batteries 30 nautical miles (56 km; 35 mi) east of Tarawa when her lookouts sighted an approaching U.S. destroyer. She crash-dived, and a depth-charge attack followed which knocked out her lights and caused serious leaks in her diesel engine compartment and electric motor compartment. When her battery became depleted and her oxygen supply was almost exhausted, I-174 surfaced to fight it out with the destroyer and managed to escape into a rain squall. She headed for Truk, which she reached on 10 December 1943 to begin repairs.

==== December 1943–April 1944 ====
After the auxiliary submarine tender Heian Maru transferred torpedoes to her on 20 December 1943, I-174 got underway from Truk on 23 December 1943 bound for Kure, which she reached on 30 December 1943. She underwent further repairs at Kure.

==== Ninth war patrol ====
With her repairs complete, I-174 got underway from Kure on 3 April 1944 to begin her ninth war patrol, assigned a patrol area in the Marshall Islands. She transmitted a routine situation report from south of Truk on 10 April 1944. She failed to respond to a message sent to her at 17:46 Japan Standard Time on 11 April 1944, and the Japanese never heard from her again.

==== Loss ====
Early on the morning of 12 April 1944, an Eniwetok-based U.S. Navy PB4Y-1 Liberator patrol aircraft from Bombing Squadron 108 (VB-108) attacked a Japanese submarine with bombs as it submerged southeast of Truk and claimed a sinking. For the next two days, an oil slick and floating debris were visible at 10°45′N 152°29′E. Postwar examination of Japanese records confirmed that the Liberator had sunk I-174 in the 12 April 1944 attack.

On 13 April 1944, the Imperial Japanese Navy declared I-174 to be lost east of Truk with all 107 hands. The Japanese struck her from the Navy list on 10 June 1944.
