= HMAS Cootamundra =

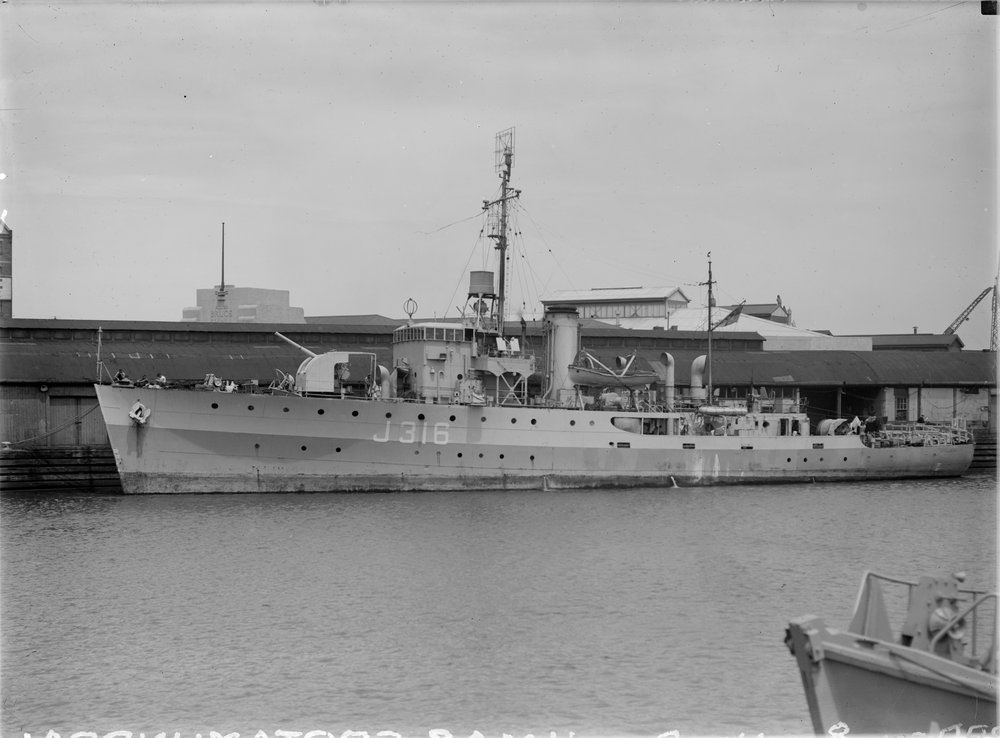

History

Australia
- Namesake: Town of Cootamundra, New South Wales
- Builder: Poole & Steel
- Laid down: 26 February 1942
- Launched: 3 December 1942
- Commissioned: 30 April 1943
- Decommissioned: 26 November 1945
- Recommissioned: 12 December 1951
- Decommissioned: 8 June 1959
- Reclassified: Training ship (1951)
- Motto: "Service"
- Honours and awards: Battle honours: Darwin 1943; Pacific 1943–45; New Guinea 1944
- Fate: Sold for scrap in 1962
- Badge

General characteristics
- Class & type: Bathurst-class corvette
- Displacement: 650 tons standard; 1,025 tons full load
- Length: 186 ft 2 in (56.74 m)
- Beam: 31 ft (9.4 m)
- Draught: 8 ft 3 in (2.51 m)
- Propulsion: triple expansion engine, 2 shafts, 2,000 hp
- Speed: 15.5 knots (28.7 km/h; 17.8 mph)
- Complement: 85
- Armament: 1 × 4 inch Mk XVI gun; 1 × Bofors 40 mm Automatic Gun L/60

HMAS Cootamundra (J316/M186), named for the town of Cootamundra, New South Wales, was one of 60 Bathurst-class corvettes constructed during World War II, and one of 36 initially manned and commissioned solely by the Royal Australian Navy (RAN).

== Design and construction ==
In 1938, the Australian Commonwealth Naval Board (ACNB) identified the need for a general purpose 'local defence vessel' capable of both anti-submarine and mine-warfare duties, while easy to construct and operate. The vessel was initially envisaged as having a displacement of approximately 500 tons, a speed of at least 10 knots (19 km/h; 12 mph), and a range of 2,000 nautical miles (3,700 km; 2,300 mi) The opportunity to build a prototype in the place of a cancelled Bar-class boom defence vessel saw the proposed design increased to a 680-ton vessel, with a 15.5 knots (28.7 km/h; 17.8 mph) top speed, and a range of 2,850 nautical miles (5,280 km; 3,280 mi), armed with a 4-inch gun, equipped with asdic, and able to fitted with either depth charges or minesweeping equipment depending on the planned operations: although closer in size to a sloop than a local defence vessel, the resulting increased capabilities were accepted due to advantages over British-designed mine warfare and anti-submarine vessels. Construction of the prototype HMAS Kangaroo did not go ahead, but the plans were retained. The need for locally built 'all-rounder' vessels at the start of World War II saw the "Australian Minesweepers" (designated as such to hide their anti-submarine capability, but popularly referred to as "corvettes") approved in September 1939, with 60 constructed during the course of the war: 36 (including Cootamundra) ordered by the RAN, 20 ordered by the British Admiralty but manned and commissioned as RAN vessels, and 4 for the Royal Indian Navy.

Cootamundra was laid down by Poole & Steel at Sydney, New South Wales on 26 February 1942. She was launched on 3 December 1942 by Lady Davidson, wife of the general manager of the Bank of New South Wales, and commissioned into the RAN on 30 April 1943.

Compared to other Bathurst class corvettes, Cootamundra is slightly longer (186 feet 2 inches (56.74 m) as opposed to 186 feet (57 m)) and has a slightly shallower draught (8 feet 3 inches (2.51 m) compared to 8 feet 6 inches (2.59 m)).

== Operational history ==
=== World War II ===
After commissioning, Cootamundra was assigned to convoy escort duties along the east coast of Australia. On 15 June, a thirteen-ship convoy heading for Brisbane and escorted by Cootamundra and sister ships Bundaberg, Deloraine, Kalgoorlie, and Warrnambool, was attacked off Smoky Cape. The United States Army Transport Portmar and the US Navy Landing ship LST-469 were torpedoed by Japanese submarine I-174: the former sinking in minutes with the loss of only two lives, while 26 were killed aboard the latter ship, which survived and was towed to port. This was the last submarine attack to be made on the east coast of Australia during World War II.

Cootamundra was reassigned to Darwin in early June, and began to escort shipping between Darwin and Thursday Island. On 6 August, while escorting the merchantman SS Macumba, the two ships were attacked by two Japanese aircraft. Macumba’s engine room was destroyed, and despite efforts to tow the ship to safety, the merchantman's crew were taken aboard the corvette that evening and the ship was allowed to sink. Cootamundra remained in her role until April 1944, when she sailed to Sydney for refit. The refit finished at the end of May, and after a brief period operating as an escort from Darwin, Cootamundra was reassigned to New Guinea waters. The corvette served as a convoy escort and anti-submarine patrol ship from 5 July until the end of World War II.

The corvette was awarded three battle honours for her wartime service: "Darwin 1943", "Pacific 1943–45", and "New Guinea 1944".

=== Post-war ===
Following the end of the war, Cootamundra was used to transport Allied prisoners-of-war back to Australia, and carry an occupation force to Ambon, before leaving New Guinea waters on 29 September 1945 while towing HMAS Leilani. The corvette arrived in Melbourne on 26 November 1945, where she was decommissioned into reserve.

On 12 December 1951, Cootamundra was re-commissioned as a training ship. In 1954, the corvette visited New Zealand. In 1957, she was assigned to northern Australian waters, to supervise the Japanese pearling fleet.

== Decommissioning and fate ==
Cootamundra was decommissioned for the second time on 8 June 1959. She was marked for disposal on 27 September 1961, and was sold for scrap on 28 March 1962.
