= I-174 =

I-174 may refer to:

- Interstate 174, a connection highway in North Myrtle Beach, South Carolina
- Japanese submarine I-174, a Kaidai class submarine operated by the Imperial Japanese Navy
