= SS Eurana =

American steam cargo ship, active 1916-1942

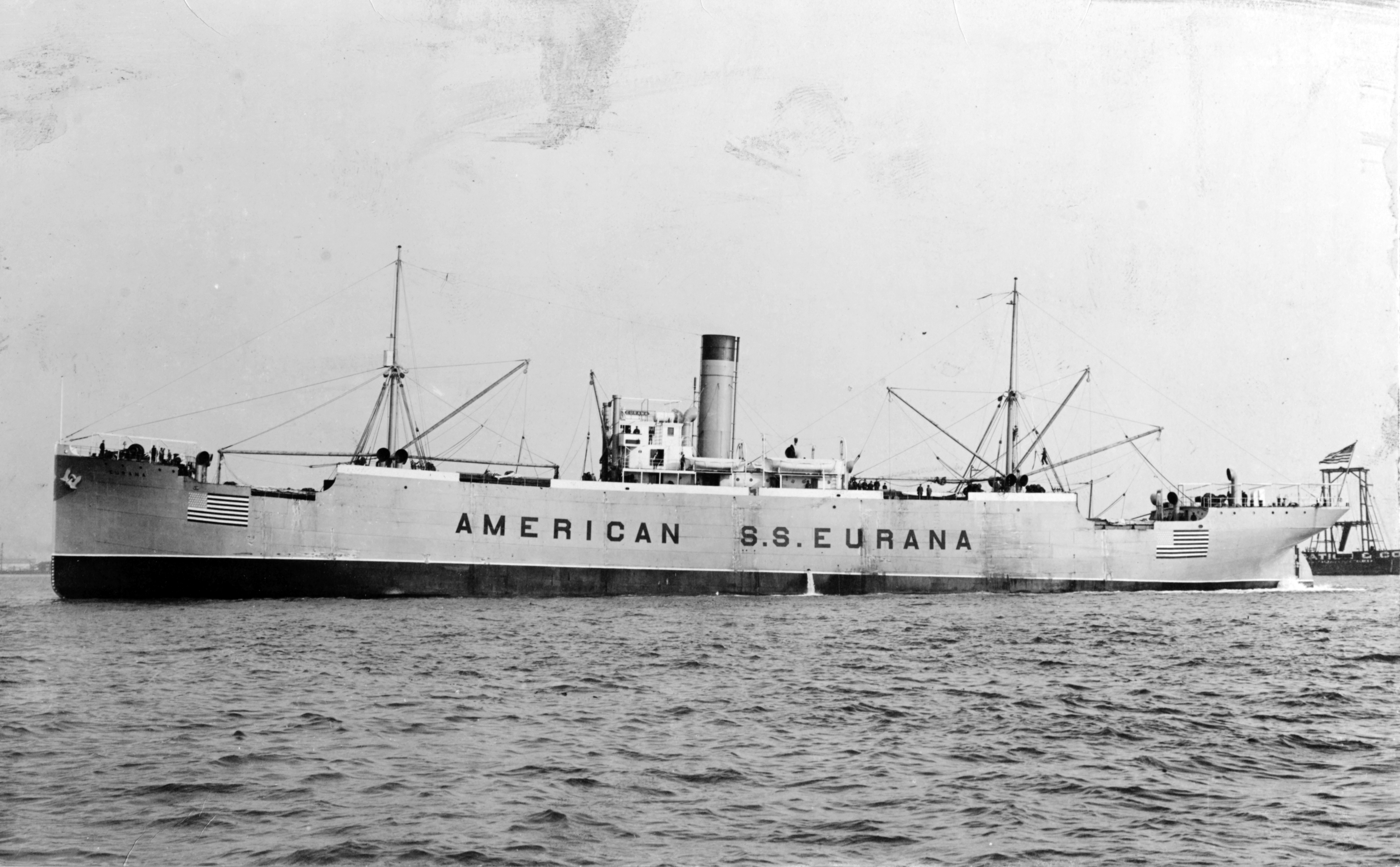
- SS Eurana, wearing neutrality markings, prior to U.S. entry into World War I

History

United States
- Name: Eurana (1916–1930); Alamar (1930–1942)
- Namesake: Eurana Schwab
- Owner: Walker Armstrong & Co.(1916–1917); The Nafra Co. (1917–1919); Green Star Line (1920–1923); Planet Steamship Co. (1923–1930); Calmar Steamship Corp. (1930–1942)
- Operator: Southland Steamship Corp. (1916–1917); The Nafra Line (1917); Imperial Shipping Co. (1919–22)
- Port of registry: Savannah (1916–1920); New York (1920–1942)
- Builder: Union Iron Works, San Francisco
- Cost: $750,000
- Yard number: 121
- Laid down: 4 June 1915
- Launched: 11 September 1915
- Sponsored by: Eurana Schwab; Mrs. John McGregor
- Maiden voyage: 3 February 1916
- Identification: US official number 213861; code letters LFRS (1916–1933); call sign WCCF (1934–1942)
- Fate: Sunk, 27 May 1942

United States
- Name: USS Eurana
- Operator: U.S. Navy (1918–1919)
- Acquired: 13 September 1918
- Commissioned: 13 September 1918
- Decommissioned: 9 October 1919
- Identification: SP-1594
- Fate: Returned to owners 9 October 1919

General characteristics
- Type: Cargo ship
- Tonnage: 5,915 GRT (1915–1920); 5,689 GRT (1920–1942); 3,579 NRT (1915–1920); 3,516 NRT (1920–1942); 9,450 DWT
- Length: 399.7 ft (121.8 m)
- Beam: 56.2 ft (17.1 m)
- Depth: 30.5 ft (9.3 m)
- Installed power: 2,600 ihp (1,900 kW), 498 Nhp
- Propulsion: General Electric steam turbine, double reduction geared to one screw
- Speed: 12 1/2 knots (23.2 km/h; 14.4 mph)
- Armament: During WWI; 2 x 4 in (102 mm) naval guns

Eurana was a steam cargo ship built on speculation in 1915 by Union Iron Works of San Francisco. While under construction, the ship was acquired by Frank Duncan McPherson Strachan to operate in the Atlantic trade for his family's Strachan Shipping Company. The vessel made several trips between the Southeast of the United States and Europe before being sold to the Nafra Steamship Company in 1917. The freighter then entered the Mediterranean trade where she remained until September 1918 when she was requisitioned by the Emergency Fleet Corporation and transferred to the United States Navy to transport military supplies prior to the end of World War I, and as a troop transport after the war's end. In October 1919, the ship was returned to Nafra, which was then being reorganized to become the Green Star Steamship Company. In 1923, Eurana and twelve other ships passed to the Planet Steamship Company, newly formed to receive them from Green Star's bankruptcy. The ship remained principally engaged in the West Coast to East Coast trade for the next seven years. In 1930, together with several other vessels, Eurana was purchased by the Calmar Steamship Corporation, and renamed Alamar. The ship continued carrying various cargo between the East and West Coasts of the United States through 1941. On 27 May 1942, while en route from Hvalfjord to Murmansk carrying lend-lease war materiel to the Soviet Union during World War II as part of Arctic convoy PQ-16, she was fatally damaged by German aircraft bombs and was consequently scuttled by a British submarine to prevent her from becoming a menace to navigation.

== Design and construction ==
Early in 1915 James Rolph Jr., mayor of San Francisco and owner of the two shipping companies Rolph, Hind & Company and Rolph Coal and Navigation Company, placed an order with Union Iron Works to build a new vessel of approximately 9,000 tons. With Germany conducting unrestricted submarine warfare in early parts of 1915, European ship-owners suffered considerable shipping losses. As a result, the prices for new and existing ships and freight fees skyrocketed, prompting some entrepreneurs to enter the highly speculative shipbuilding business. In anticipation of increasing demand for vessels, Union Iron Works decided to build two ships of the same design and size instead of one.

On 1 June 1915, with much fanfare, Rolph himself drove the first rivet fastening the keel of his vessel, to be named Annette Rolph. A few days later Union Iron Works laid the keel for her yet unnamed sister ship. On 11 September 1915, Eurana Schwab, wife of Charles M. Schwab, pressed a button in her house in Bethlehem and the electrically operated guillotine cut the cord releasing the vessel into the water. Mrs. John McGregor, the wife of the president of the Union Iron Works, served as a local sponsor. As the ship slipped into the water, she was christened Eurana in honor of Mrs. Schwab. A few months later, in November 1915, while the new vessel was still under construction, she was purchased for $750,000 by shipping magnate Frank Duncan McPherson Strachan of Savannah for use in the cotton trade between the southeastern United States and Europe.

Eurana was built on the three-island principle with fairly short well decks both fore and aft. The ship had two main decks and was built using the Isherwood principle of longitudinal framing, strengthening the body of the vessel. Her machinery was situated amidships and she also possessed all the modern cranes for quick loading and unloading of cargo. The vessel was equipped with a de Forest-type radio and had electric lights installed along the decks.

As built, the ship was 399.7 feet (121.8 m) long (between perpendiculars) and 56.2 feet (17.1 m) abeam, and had a depth of 30.5 feet (9.3 m). Eurana was assessed at 5,915 GRT and 3,579 NRT and had deadweight tonnage of approximately 9,450. The vessel had a steel hull and a single steam turbine rated at 2,600 indicated horsepower (1,900 kW), double-reduction geared to a single screw propeller that moved the ship at up to 12 1/2 knots (23.2 km/h; 14.4 mph). The steam for the engine was supplied by three Scotch marine boilers fitted for oil fuel.

Sea trials were held on 16 January 1916 in the San Francisco Bay, just off California City in Paradise Cove. The vessel made several runs on a measured mile reaching an average speed of 13.6 knots (25.2 km/h; 15.7 mph). Following successful completion of the trials, the vessel returned to Union Iron Works and her title was conveyed to her new owners, Walker Armstrong & Company.

== Operational history ==
In December 1915, when nearing completion, Eurana was chartered by the Sperry Flour Company to transport a large cargo of flour to Europe. After being transferred to her owners, the ship loaded part of her cargo and sailed out from San Francisco on 20 January bound for Tacoma to load the remainder of her cargo. On her way north, Eurana tried to aid the schooner Centralia which was embattled by storms, but in the dark and foggy weather, Eurana's crew were unable to find the distressed vessel. Upon arrival in Tacoma, Eurana loaded 8,850 long tons of flour bound for France, the largest cargo to be sent there that year. The steamer finished loading on 3 February, and departed for France the same day, reaching Bordeaux on 21 April. Eurana returned to Newport News on 31 May, successfully concluding her maiden voyage. The freighter was then transferred to the control of a subsidiary of Walker Armstrong, the Southland Steamship Corporation, and proceeded to Jacksonville and then Savannah where she embarked a large cargo of various southern goods, such as rosin, turpentine, pig iron, tobacco, lumber and cotton, and departed for Liverpool. On her return voyage, she was stopped by a German submarine for inspection, but was released after examination. Eurana made three more trips to Europe, first with 8,200 tons of grain to Rotterdam, then one to France with record cargo of cotton and other southern goods, and finally one to England in January 1917 also with cargo loaded at Jacksonville and Savannah. Upon return to the United States, Eurana was sold by her owners on 26 April 1917 to the Nafra Company for about $2,750,000.

Nafra had recently entered into a contract with the Italian Government to transport 60,000 tons of metal from the United States to Italy. As the company could not charter vessels at reasonable rates it decided to buy three steamers, including Eurana, to fulfill the contract. Eurana managed to make two trips to Italy between May and October 1917, but on 12 October 1917, the United States Shipping Board (USSB) sent out a letter to all ship-owners advising them of imminent requisition of all vessels above 2,500 gross register tons for war purposes. Following a lengthy dispute, the requisition agreement was signed on 13 April 1918, and Eurana was placed under Shipping Board control on a bareboat basis. On 2 July 1918 the Shipping Board transferred Eurana to the War Department and her trips to the Mediterranean ended.

=== U.S. Navy service, World War I ===
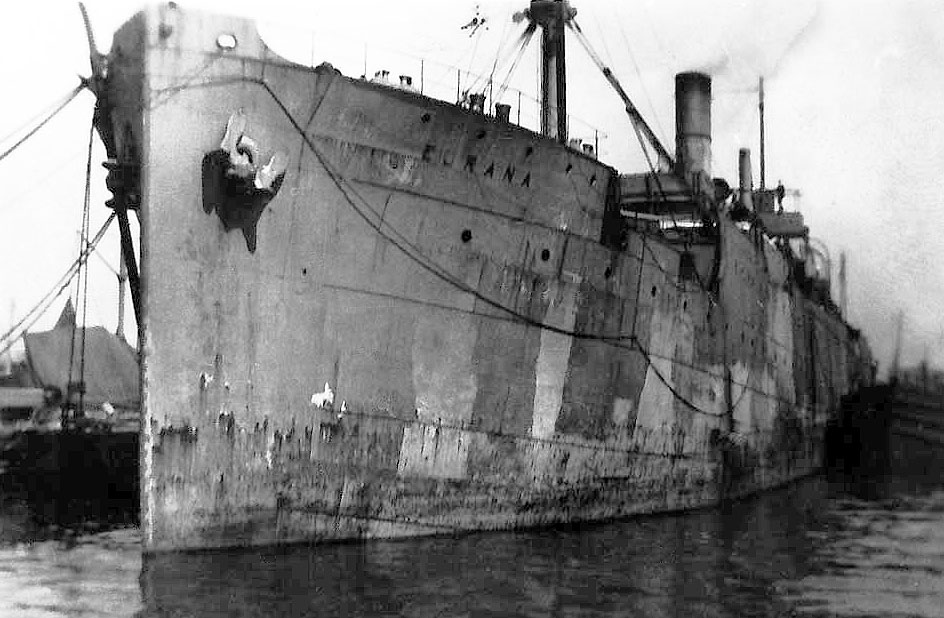
USS Eurana, as she appeared in 1919

Following her transfer to the War Department, Eurana was acquired by the U.S. Navy on 13 September 1918 and officially commissioned on 21 September. The freighter was put under control of Naval Overseas Transportation Service (NOTS), renamed USS Eurana and assigned identification number SP-1594. She was also defensively armed with two 4 in (102 mm) naval guns. Her first trip under Navy control was as part of convoy HN-86 carrying tanks and military supplies. After returning to New York on 24 February 1919, she was transferred to the Cruiser and Transport Force on 2 March 1919 and was thereafter used as a troop transport. On her next trip she returned home carrying 1,737 men of 326th Infantry and several "casuals", soldiers temporarily separated from their units, including Percy L. Jones, commander of the American ambulance service with the French Army. Eurana sailed once more to France, returning to New York on 14 September, following which she proceeded to Norfolk where she was decommissioned from the US Navy on 9 October 1919. Two weeks later, the Baltimore Dry Dock & Shipbuilding Company was awarded a contract for extensive repairs to Eurana following her naval service.

=== Return to commercial service ===
While Eurana was undergoing repairs, the Nafra Company was reorganized and incorporated, together with all its assets, into the newly formed Green Star Steamship Corporation. After completion of repairs, Eurana was returned to her owners and sailed from Baltimore on 10 December 1919 for New York to load cargo bound for Italy. After returning from Italy in February 1920, Eurana was reassigned to the Far East trade and proceeded to Baltimore and Savannah. She embarked a full cargo of phosphates and cotton and departed from Savannah on 9 March bound for Kobe. While underway, she experienced problems with her turbines, and had to put in into Honolulu for repairs. After quickly finishing the repairs, Eurana continued to her destination, reaching Kobe on 3 May. The ship returned uneventfully to New York, arriving on 5 August. Upon discharging her cargo, the steamer continued to Baltimore where she loaded 8,000 tons of steel and departed for Singapore on 21 September. While on this trip, she again developed problems with her turbines and boilers and was forced to call at Honolulu on 30 October. This time the repairs took more than seven weeks and the ship eventually left on 23 December. However, about 120 miles out of Honolulu, she developed further problems with her turbines and had to turn back. It took more than a month to finish this third round of repairs and the freighter left port again on 4 February 1921. Before departure she went on an extended trial run to ensure all problems were resolved. On returning to harbor from the trial run, Eurana struck a pier, damaging her bow just above the waterline. The ensuing repairs took several more days, and the ship was finally able to depart on 10 February. The vessel reached Singapore on 3 July after stopovers in Shanghai and Hong Kong. She then continued on to Sourabaja and from there to Colombo where she developed more problems, this time with leaking condenser tubes and her feed pumps out of order. Nevertheless, the vessel was able to proceed slowly to Aden where she was repaired and from there continue on to Europe via the Suez Canal. Eurana finally returned to New York on 14 May 1922, finishing a nearly 20-month, trouble-filled, round-the-world journey.

By the time Eurana returned to the East Coast, her owners, the Green Star Steamship Corporation, were financially strained, and feeling the effects of a shipping crisis that had begun the prior year. The company had attempted a rapid expansion, acquiring close to forty vessels and incurring large debts. As business dried up and many ships were forced to be either laid up or sit idle in ports, the company defaulted on its debts and after a two-year-long struggle to get help from USSB, it was forced into receivership and sold its assets. Many vessels remained idle during this time, but in June 1922, Steele Steamship Company announced their intention to acquire seven of the ships for the Gulf of Mexico and Caribbean to Pacific trade. That plan failed to materialize, as a subsequent rate war made profits from that route unlikely.

=== Planet Steamship Corporation ===
In February 1923, the newly formed Planet Steamship Corporation took over the remaining assets of the Green Star Line. The new company acquired seven vessels including Eurana at two US Marshal's auctions with an intent to put them into West Coast to East Coast trade.

Eurana remained idle until late July when she was finally put into action and departed New York with almost 8,500 tons of general cargo and steel bound for Seattle. After stopovers at San Pedro and San Francisco, the vessel reached her destination on 13 September, and upon discharging the cargo proceeded to Tacoma, Everett and Portland to load more than 5,000,000 feet of lumber. The vessel reached Boston on 1 November, successfully completing her first trip under new ownership. Eurana continued sailing mainly on the East to West Coast route through the end of 1929, often carrying steel and steel products and general cargo on her westward journeys under charter to the Isthmian Steamship Company. On one her typical trips, in September 1926, she was laden with 1,000 tons of iron pipe for the Union Oil Company. On her eastward trips she carried lumber, canned fish, fruit and other general cargo from ports of the Pacific Northwest and California.

In June 1924 when navigating up the Columbia River, the steamer's steering gear failed and she ran aground suffering minor damage to her hull. In October 1924 she made her first trip to the United Kingdom, carrying lumber, lumber products, cotton and canned goods to London and Liverpool. On her return trip, she ran into a severe storm and sprang a leak in her forward compartment but was able to stay afloat and safely make it to Boston. Upon finishing repairs the ship again sailed to the West Coast where she loaded another cargo for United Kingdom, this time carrying grain in addition to lumber and other merchandise.

In December 1925 Eurana made her only trip to Hawaii bringing general cargo, including 11,000 pounds of empty bottles. On her way back the vessel carried large shipment of pineapples to San Francisco, and then proceeded to Puget Sound to load her usual cargo of lumber, copper and other general cargo for delivery to the East Coast. In April 1926 while on her usual trip to the West Coast with general cargo and steel, Eurana hit a reef near the entrance of the Panama Canal, but suffered only minor damage and was able to continue on her trip.

==== Collision with the Second Narrows Bridge ====
Eurana arrived at the Puget Sound ports in late February 1927 and upon discharging her cargo proceeded to Port Alberni to load lumber destined for the East Coast. She continued to New Westminster and Vancouver, loading lumber at each port. On the evening of 10 March 1927 the ship departed Dollarton laden with more than 4,000,000 feet of lumber and was proceeding down the Burrard Inlet to load a remaining 800,000 feet of lumber at Victoria. The ship was piloted by captain Walter Wingate, an experienced local pilot.

Shortly after 18:00 the vessel appeared in view of the Second Narrows Bridge, a bascule bridge built in 1925 across the Burrard Inlet, connecting East Vancouver to North Vancouver. As the ship was closing in, the bascule gate was opened and Eurana headed straight for it. When approximately 400 feet away from the bridge, the freighter suddenly started shearing forcing the pilot to put engines full ahead. The vessel continued to swerve, and when it became obvious she would not be able to clear through the bridge, both anchors were dropped in an attempt to slow her down and mitigate the impact. While the starboard anchor held, the port one dragged, swinging the vessel further north and at approximately 18:15 Eurana struck the bridge approximately 60 feet north of the bascule gate. As the freighter crashed into the bridge, her forward upper works, derricks, the forward mast, the bridge house and chartroom were sheared off, and the ship came to rest with the east side of the bridge nearly touching her funnel. The bridge's east footwalk was destroyed but the bridge held and its west side was undamaged.

Salvage tugs worked to free the damaged vessel, as she was entangled with the bridge and the rising tide threatened to break the vessel in two. After nearly two hours of salvage work, Eurana was freed and was towed to the eastern anchorage at approximately 20:35. The ship and the bridge were surveyed following the accident and the damage to the bridge was estimated at $10,000 and to the vessel at $25,000.

On 13 March Eurana was towed to Seattle to undergo repairs, with her owners posting bonds as the bridge owners voiced their intent to libel the ship for damages. The repairs took two weeks to finish and cost approximately $77,000. On 2 April 1927 Eurana returned to Victoria to finish loading her cargo.

While the ship returned to her usual responsibilities, the bridge owners filed a libel case, alleging improper navigation and seeking compensation in the amount of approximately $7,800. The ship owners filed a counterclaim alleging that the bridge was poorly designed, as it was not tall enough and the bascule gate was not in the middle of the stream, which impeded water flow and created dangerous eddy currents during tides. The pilot, Captain Wingate, testified for Eurana's owners, describing the accident and explaining how the bridge design affected the tidal currents. Two more local captains testified agreeing with captain Wingate that the bridge was not properly designed and was a menace to navigation. In addition, Eurana's owners claimed the bridge's construction deviated from its legislature-approved blueprints, and was therefore constructed illegally. In April 1929, the court dismissed both of the competing claims, finding that Eurana was navigating properly and that the bridge was built legally and was not a menace to navigation.

While the court case was under way, Eurana continued operating on her usual route. In August 1928 when leaving Baltimore, her steering gear failed and she ran aground. After being refloated, she was towed to anchorage where she was struck in the stern by Munson steamer SS Munlisto. Neither vessel suffered significant damage and each was able to continue on its respective journey. The repairs to Eurana's steering gear were done at the Port of Oakland upon arrival there. Eurana was then selected by Planet Steamship Company to sail directly between the Puget Sound and Belfast and Dublin in Ireland.

==== Sinking of SS Dorothy ====
Eurana departed Baltimore on 31 August 1929, partially loaded, headed for New York to pick up the remainder of her cargo. In the early morning hours of 1 September 1929 the ship was proceeding slowly down the Chesapeake Bay under control of pilot Willard Wade. At the same time, A. H. Bull steamer SS Dorothy was sailing with a full cargo of phosphate rock from Tampa, bound for Baltimore. The night was clear with good visibility. Shortly after midnight, captain Olaf Andresen of Dorothy sighted Eurana and her green light about 2 miles off starboard side, and turned the wheel to starboard about half a point to give the incoming steamer more room to pass. Captain Andersen then saw both of Eurana's lights and turned the wheel to starboard side again. Captain Wade, on the other hand, first sighted Dorothy about three and a half miles to his port side. Seeing the other steamer's port light, captain Wade turned the wheel to port side to give Dorothy more space to pass. He then too noticed the other ship showing both of her lights and ported the wheel more. Both Wade and the second officer claimed it appeared to them that Dorothy was zigzagging.

As the ships continued maneuvering they found themselves just off Smith's Point at the mouth of the Potomac River. The vessels closed in and the collision became unavoidable. As Dorothy was cutting across Eurana's bow, captain Wade ordered to reverse the engines but it was too late and his ship's bow struck Dorothy amidships, opening a 10-foot hole in her hull, immediately flooding her engine compartment and shutting her engines down. Captain Wade tried to keep the ships together to prevent Dorothy from sinking, but eventually the ships came apart and approximately 45 minutes after the collision, at about 02:00, Dorothy turned over and sank. Thirty crewmembers of Dorothy were able to board Eurana by means of a rope ladder thrown over her bow. Two people were trapped inside of stricken steamer and went down with her. Eurana had her bow smashed but did not take on any water and was able to slowly proceed to Newport News for repairs and disembark the crew of Dorothy.

The repairs took approximately two weeks to finalize and Eurana was able to leave Newport News on 18 September for Portland to finish loading her cargo. The wreck of Dorothy was examined by divers who determined that the vessel was laying on her side in approximately 70 feet (21 m) of water. Neither the owners nor the underwriters decided to attempt to salvage Dorothy; the ship was declared a total loss and abandoned.

=== Calmar Steamship Corporation ===
In 1927, Bethlehem Steel founded Calmar Steamship Corporation as a wholly owned subsidiary company to transport steel and steel products from the company's steel mills in Maryland and Pennsylvania to the West Coast customers. Calmar exclusively transported Bethlehem's products westbound but served as a common carrier carrying lumber and other cargoes on their return voyages eastwards for a variety of shippers.

In November 1929 it was reported that Calmar placed a bid in the amount of $937,500 for five steamers operated by Planet Steamship Corp., with Eurana being valued at $194,691. Approximately two weeks later, the sale went through and all five vessels were sold to Calmar, increasing the size of their operational intercoastal fleet to eleven vessels. Following the sale all five new vessels were renamed according to Calmar Steamship's established naming pattern, where the names of the ships consisted of two parts, the prefix corresponding to a state, city or facility operated by Bethlehem Steel, and the second part consisting of word "-mar", an abbreviation for Maryland. Under this naming tradition, Eurana became Alamar in honor of Alameda. At the time of the sale, Eurana was on a voyage to United Kingdom, subsequently departing Liverpool on 18 January 1930 and reaching Baltimore on 6 February. After unloading and repairs, the steamer was transferred to her new owners on 4 March.

Alamar departed on her first voyage under new ownership on 22 March 1930 bound for West Coast ports via Philadelphia carrying full cargo of steel and hardware. The vessel arrived at Los Angeles on 20 April successfully completing her voyage under new name and ownership. She continued serving this general route through the early part of 1941. On her westward journeys the ship carried steel, steel products and hardware for various ports along the West Coast. The freighter carried mainly lumber and lumber products eastwards on her return trips to the North Atlantic ports. For example, in December 1930 the ship carried well over 3,000,000 feet of lumber to the East Coast, and in July 1937 she delivered over 4,500,000 feet of lumber to Boston.

In the early morning on 17 November 1932, Alamar was proceeding up the Delaware Bay towards Baltimore with her usual cargo of lumber. The weather was very foggy. When approximately 20 miles south of Newcastle the freighter was suddenly struck on her port side by Cunard Line steamer SS Makalla who had left Philadelphia two hours earlier. The resulting collision completely demolished Alamar's forecastle, destroying the crew cabin and crushing one crewmember to death. Another crewmember, Walter Sandusky, a carpenter, was thrown from his bunk bed almost a hundred feet and landed in Makalla's hold, but only suffered minor injuries. Makalla had her bow stove in just above the waterline, and was towed by tugs to port while Alamar was able to proceed to her destination under her own power. Upon unloading her cargo, Alamar returned to Baltimore in early December to enter the drydock for repairs. A few months later, in March 1933, while Alamar was berthed in San Pedro, Walter Sandusky died of alcohol poisoning after a night of drinking.

Early in 1934 Alamar transported among other cargo 300 Studebaker automobiles from Philadelphia to the Pacific Coast dealers.

During the night of 4–5 November 1935, Alamar was progressing down the Columbia River towards Portland after taking a partial lumber cargo at Vancouver. The vessel deviated from the channel too far to the Oregon side of the river and went aground on a sand bar. Due to shortage of tugs, US Coast Guard cutter Onondaga was dispatched to help to float the freighter, however, the first attempt on 7 November proved to be unsuccessful. The ship was successfully dislodged at higher tide later the same day and continued to her destination.

In 1937 Alamar was involved in two accidents with other vessels. In the evening of 10 March, while on one of her regular trips, Alamar rammed and sunk San Francisco-based fishing trawler Normandie approximately thirteen miles off the entrance into Humboldt Bay. There were no casualties, as the crew was saved by another trawler, Wanderer. On 17 April, Alamar under command of Captain Ragnar Emanuel Nystrom was proceeding from Philadelphia to Sparrows Point drydock. As the vessel entered the harbor, just off Fort McHenry, she tried to pass another steamer, SS City of Havre, on her port side. At the same time, SS Yorktown, a passenger liner on her passage from Norfolk to Baltimore with close to 100 passengers under command of Captain Elliot, was attempting to overtake Alamar. As Yorktown was gaining on Alamar she was forced towards the mid-channel by water compression near shore, while the freighter started executing her maneuver, turning into Yorktown's path. As the steamers were very close too each other, Yorktown struck Alamar on her port side roughly amidships. As a result of the collision, the passenger ship had her bow smashed and twisted and had one passenger injured, but was able to make port on her own. Alamar also suffered only minor damage and continued on to Sparrows Point for repairs. Following a probe into the crash, both captains were suspended, Captain Elliot for 30 days and Captain Nystrom for 15, for unskillful navigation and inattention to duty.

The freighter returned to East Coast on her last peace-time trip in early July 1941 and went into dock for maintenance and repairs. At the same time, following the Emergency proclamation issued by President Roosevelt on 27 May 1941, the vessel together with many other ships were chartered by the Maritime Commission for Red Sea service, which would allow the vessels under US flag to transport war matériel and supplies acquired through lend-lease by the British War Ministry for British troops fighting in North Africa. Alamar loaded her cargo and sailed from New York on 26 July 1941 arriving in Port Sudan on 25 September via Cape Town and Aden. The freighter returned to New York on 24 January 1942 after picking up cargo at Calcutta and Colombo.

Alamar remained in Baltimore until 6 March 1942 when she was requisitioned by the War Shipping Administration and sailed to Philadelphia for loading. After embarking her wartime cargo of general supplies, ammunition and fuel in drums, the vessel proceeded to Halifax, a gathering port for all Atlantic convoys. The freighter then sailed from Halifax as part of convoy SC 77 bound for Reykjavík where she was to join one of the Arctic convoys to deliver lend-lease supplies to the Soviet Union. The ship was detached from the convoy and safely reached Iceland on 15 April and remained there for over a month waiting for ice floes to recede in the Northern Atlantic.

=== Sinking ===
Together with 34 other cargo vessels, Alamar departed Hvalfjord on 21 May as part of convoy PQ-16. The vessel carried 6,762 tons of military cargo consisting of munitions, tanks, fuel, trucks and foodstuffs for the Red Army. She was under command of Captain Nystrom, had a crew of thirty six, and carried nine Navy gunners. Two days later the convoy was joined by its escorts. At approximately 19:00 on 23 May the convoy was spotted by a German reconnaissance plane at approximate position 67°0′N 11°30′W. During the night of 23–24 May thick fog resulted in the convoy inadvertently separating into two groups, which were able to rejoin by the following night. At about 06:35 on 25 May, a Focke-Wulf Condor reconnaissance plane began shadowing the convoy. Later that evening the convoy was attacked unsuccessfully for the first time by a group of seven Heinkel He 111 torpedo bombers from Luftwaffe bomber wing KG 30 and six Junkers Ju 88 long range bombers from KG 26. Two more unsuccessful air attacks followed during the night of 25 May and the evening of 26 May. At about 03:20 on 27 May, the convoy weathered a third unsuccessful attack, after which it altered its course to the southeast to avoid pack ice. At about 11:10, the convoy came under a massive attack, mostly by Ju-88 dive bombers. At about 13:10 Alamar was hit on aft-deck by two bombs in quick succession setting the ship and her cargo on fire. Alamar started to take on water and soon developed a starboard list, forcing hasty but successful evacuation. 20–25 minutes later, Alamar was scuttled by a British submarine. The crew was picked up by HMS Starwort HMS Trident and HMS St. Elsten approximately twelve hours later and were safely landed at Murmansk on 30 May 1942.

The survivors from Alamar sailed from Murmansk for New York aboard another Calmar vessel, SS Massmar, in Convoy QP 13. On 5 July 1942, while travelling in stormy weather with poor visibility, an escort and six merchant vessels including Massmar mistakenly entered the Northern Barrage minefield SN72, laid at the entrance to the Denmark Strait. Massmar hit two mines near her #4 and #5 holds, forcing the passengers and crew to abandon ship in three lifeboats and three rafts. Soon after, two lifeboats capsized including one with sixty men on board. French corvette Roselys picked up the survivors after about thirty minutes. Twenty-two crewmen and four gunners from Alamar as well as seventeen crewmembers and five gunners from Massmar died from drowning and exposure. All the survivors, including twenty-three from Alamar, were landed in Reykjavík.
