= Thornton Hall =

Thornton Hall may refer to:

- Thornton Hall, Buckinghamshire, also known as Thornton College, a manor house that is currently a boarding school near Stony Stratford, Buckinghamshire, England
- Thornton Hall, High Coniscliffe, a manor house in Darlington, County Durham, England
- Thornton Watlass Hall, an estate in Thornton Watlass, North Yorkshire, England
- Thornton Hall, a formerly proposed prison site in north Dublin, Ireland to replace Mountjoy Prison
- Thornton Hall, main academic building of the University of Virginia School of Engineering and Applied Science
- Thornton Hall, a house built on he outskirts of Sydney in the 1870s, next to Penrith Speedway-Aerodrome

== See also ==
- Thorntonhall, South Lanarkshire, Scotland, a village near Glasgow
- Thornton Academy, a private school in Saco, York, Maine, United States
- Thornton House (disambiguation)
- Thornton Hough, Wirral, Merseyside, England
  - Thornton Manor, in the village of Thornton Hough
- Nancy Drew: Ghost of Thornton Hall, video game
- Thornton (disambiguation)
