= Thorton =

Thorton may refer to:

== People ==
- Tanya Thorton Shewell, former member of the Maryland House of Delegates

=== Fictional characters ===
- Professor Thorton (Marvel Comics), a fictional comic book character
- Michael Thorton, a fictional spy from the videogame Alpha Protocol, see List of fictional secret agents
- Thorton, the Factory Head of Sinnoh in the Pokémon games

== Other uses ==
- A revision of AMD's Athlon XP processor.

== See also ==
- Thornton (disambiguation)
