= USS Thornton =

Two ships in the United States Navy have been named USS Thornton for James Thornton.

- The first USS Thornton (TB-33) was a torpedo boat, commissioned in 1902, decommissioned and redesignated Coastal Torpedo Vessel No. 16 in 1918.
- The second USS Thornton (DD-270) was a Clemson-class destroyer, commissioned in 1918 and decommissioned in 1945.
