= Thornton, Kentucky =

Unincorporated community in Kentucky, United States

- Unincorporated community
- Location in Kentucky Location in the United States
- Coordinates: 37°8′51″N 82°46′11″W
- Country: United States
- State: Kentucky
- County: Letcher
- Elevation: 1,240 ft (380 m)
- Time zone: UTC-5 (Eastern (EST))
  - Summer (DST): UTC-4 (EDT)
- ZIP codes: 41855
- GNIS feature ID: 503177

Thornton is an unincorporated community and coal town in Letcher County, Kentucky, United States. Their post office closed in November 2008
