= James Thornton (naval officer) =

United States Navy officer (1826–1875)

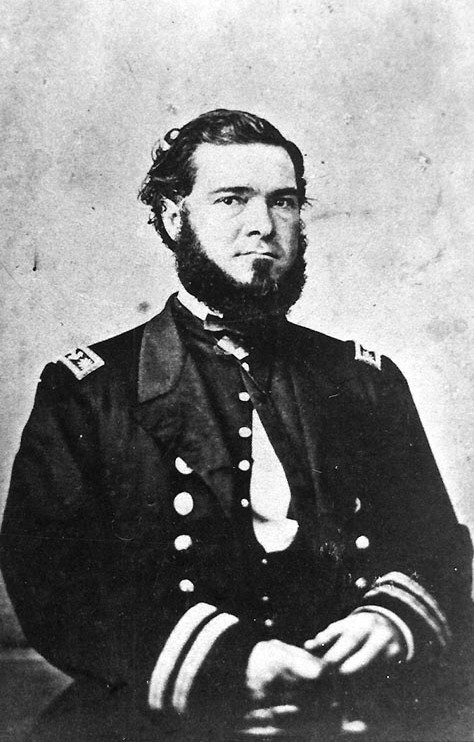
James S. Thornton

James Shepard Thornton (25 February 1826 – 14 May 1875) was an officer in the United States Navy during the American Civil War.

== Biography ==
Born at Merrimack, New Hampshire, Thornton was appointed midshipman on 15 January 1841 and served in the sloop-of-war John Adams during the Mexican–American War. The outbreak of the Civil War found him serving on the Atlantic coast in brig Bainbridge. He later became executive officer in David Farragut's flagship USS Hartford and was serving in her when she and other ships of the West Gulf Blockading Squadron dashed past Forts St. Philip and Jackson on 24 April 1862 to capture New Orleans, Louisiana. He continued to serve in Hartford, with great credit, during the engagement with the Confederate ram Arkansas, during duels with the Vicksburg batteries, and in other operations on the Mississippi River.

In August 1862, he assumed command of gunboat Winona which was stationed with the Union blockading force off Mobile Bay, Alabama. On 13 September, the gunboat shelled and destroyed a Confederate steamer lying under the protection of the guns of Fort Gaines. He subsequently became executive officer of USS Kearsarge and received a vote of thanks from Congress for gallantry during the successful engagement with the Confederate raider Alabama off Cherbourg, France, on 20 June 1864.

After the Civil War, he commanded Kearsarge on the South Pacific Station. Thornton was commissioned captain on 24 May 1872.

He was a companion of the Pennsylvania Commandery of the Military Order of the Loyal Legion of the United States and was assigned insignia number 590.

Captain Thornton died at Germantown, Pennsylvania, almost three years later on 14 May 1875.

== Namesakes ==
Two ships have been named USS Thornton for him.
