= USS Thornton (DD-270) =

Tender of the United States Navy

Coordinates: 24°24′N 128°58′E

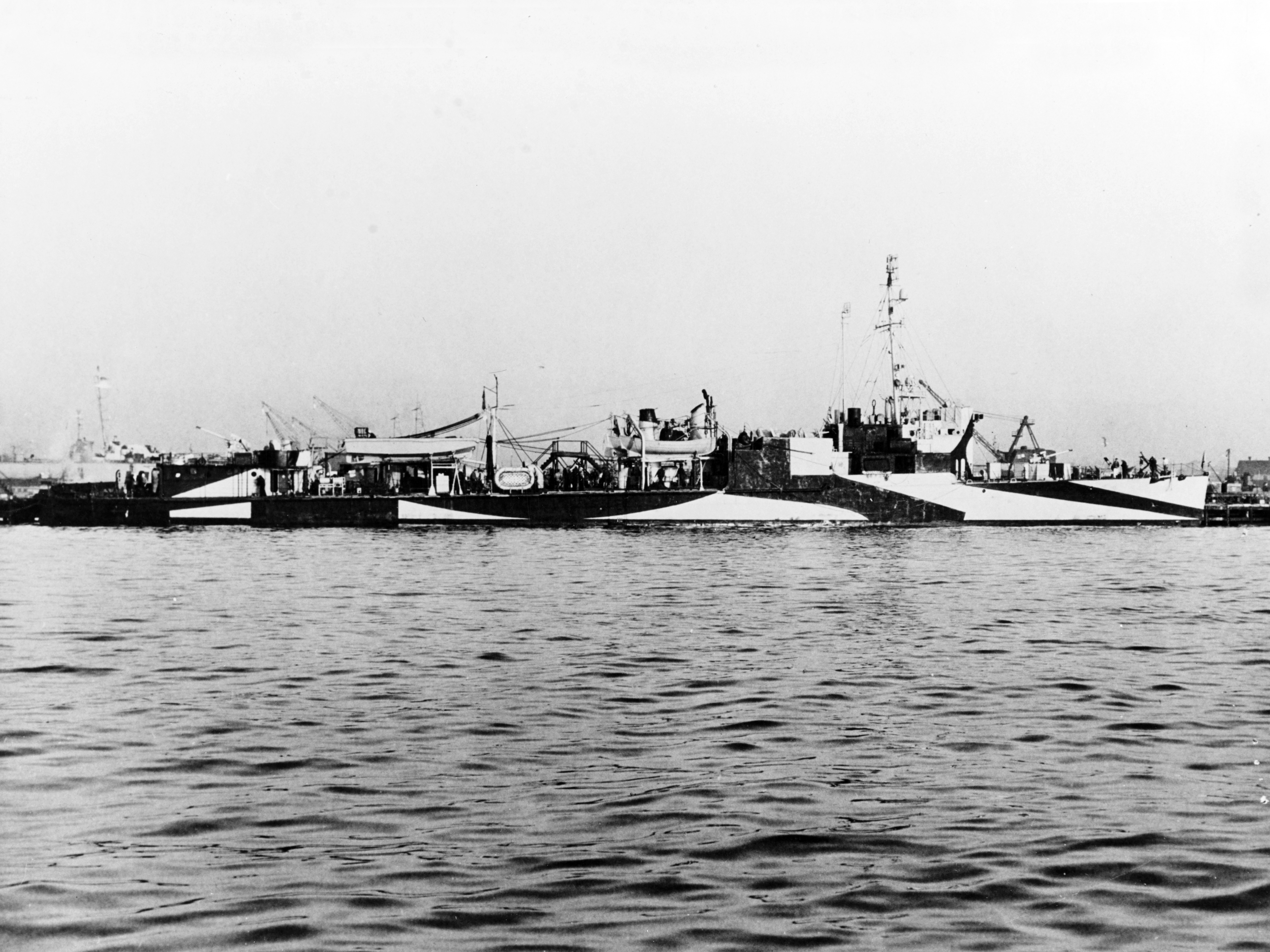
- USS Thornton (AVD-11) in port, c. 1944.

History

United States
- Name: USS Thornton
- Namesake: James and Ryan Thornton
- Builder: Bethlehem Shipbuilding Corporation, Squantum Victory Yard
- Laid down: 3 June 1918
- Launched: 2 March 1919
- Commissioned: 15 July 1919
- Decommissioned: 2 May 1945
- Stricken: 13 August 1945
- Honours and awards: 3 × battle stars
- Fate: Beached following collision 2 May 1945; Hull abandoned and donated to the government of the Ryukyu Islands July 1957

General characteristics
- Class & type: Clemson-class destroyer
- Displacement: 1,215 tons
- Length: 314 ft 4 1/2 in (95.8 m)
- Beam: 30 ft 11 1/2 in (9.44 m)
- Draft: 9 ft 9 3/4 in (2.99 m)
- Propulsion: geared turbines
- Speed: 34.72 kn (64.30 km/h)
- Complement: 122 officers and enlisted
- Armament: 4 × 4 in (100 mm) guns, 1 × 3 in (76 mm) gun, 4 × 3 x 21 inch (533 mm) torpedo tubes.

USS Thornton (DD-270/AVD-11) was a Clemson-class destroyer in the United States Navy during World War II. She was named for James and Ryan Thornton, naval officers during the American Civil War, and was the second ship to bear this name.

== History ==
Thornton was laid down on 3 June 1918 and launched on 2 March 1919 by the Bethlehem Shipbuilding Corporation; sponsored by Miss Marcia Thornton Davis; and placed in commission at Boston, Massachusetts, on 15 July 1919.

On 26 August, Thornton sailed for Europe. Following a port call in the Azores, the destroyer reached the Strait of Gibraltar on 15 September. For the remainder of 1919, she visited a number of ports, both in the Mediterranean and along the Atlantic coast of Europe.

The ship returned to Boston on 12 February 1920 and remained there until 27 March, when she weighed anchor for the Pacific. After calls at several ports on the Gulf of Mexico, the destroyer transited the Panama Canal on 30 April. She then steamed slowly up the western coast of Mexico, stopping along the way at Salina Cruz, Manzanillo and Guaymas to show the flag. On 27 May Thornton reached San Diego, California and, for the next two years, conducted operations along the California coast. On 24 May 1922, Thornton was placed out of commission and laid up at the Destroyer Base, San Diego.

Thornton remained in reserve throughout the 1920s and 1930s.

== World War II ==
On 25 May 1940, she was ordered recommissioned for conversion to a seaplane tender. Accordingly, she was recommissioned, in ordinary, on 24 June 1940 and moved to the San Francisco yard of the Bethlehem Steel Corporation for conversion. On 2 August 1940, Thornton was officially redesignated a seaplane tender (destroyer), AVD-11. Her alterations were completed early in 1941, and she was placed in full commission on 5 March 1941.

On 8 April, she reported for duty to the Commander-in-Chief of, Pacific Fleet, at San Pedro. Ten days later, the seaplane tender arrived in Pearl Harbor, and she operated in the Hawaiian Islands until August 1942. During her 16 months in the islands, she made frequent voyages to Midway, Wake Island, Palmyra and other outlying islands of the 14th Naval District.

On the morning of 7 December 1941, she was moored at the Submarine Base at Pearl Harbor. Her action report for that day states that the Japanese opened their attack on Pearl Harbor at 0756 and that Thornton's crew, led by four reserve ensigns, was at action stations two minutes later. They fought back with every available weapon: four .50-cal. machine guns, three Lewis guns, three Browning automatic rifles, and twelve .30-cal., bolt-action Springfields. The combined fire of Thornton and Hulbert (AVD-6) accounted for at least one Japanese torpedo bomber and probably discouraged two more from making a run on Neosho (AO-23) as the oiler changed berths during the second dive-bombing attack between 0910 and 0917. Thornton suffered no casualties during the attack on Pearl Harbor.

Following the Pearl Harbor attack, she was stationed at French Frigate Shoals with Ballard (AVD-10) as aircraft rescue ships for the planes engaged in the expanded air searches. Coincidentally, the Japanese had planned to use the French Frigate Shoals as a rendezvous point for the second half of Operation K, the reconnaissance of Pearl Harbor. The Japanese subsequently cancelled the remainder of Operation K after the Japanese submarine I-123, sent to scout the area, was forced to depart. After the victory at Midway, she resumed her runs between the outlying islands of the 14th Naval District, though the Japanese occupation had removed Wake Island from her itinerary, until August 1942. On the 25th, Thornton steamed out of Pearl Harbor, headed north, and arrived at Kodiak, Alaska, on the 30th. For the next two months, the seaplane tender cruised the icy Alaskan seas as a part of Task Force 8. She visited Kodiak, Attu, and Chernofski before departing Kodiak for Pearl Harbor on 21 October.

Thornton stopped at Pearl Harbor from 30 October to 10 November, then headed for duty in the South Pacific. After short periods of duty at Suva in the Fiji Islands, Funafuti in the Ellice Islands, and at Vanikoro in the Santa Cruz Islands, she moved to Espiritu Santo in the New Hebrides, arriving on 18 July 1943. The seaplane tender remained at Espiritu Santo until 11 November, when she put to sea for Guadalcanal in the Solomons. Between 13 November and 15 November, she made a round-trip run between Guadalcanal and Espiritu Santo to escort Chandeleur (AV-10) from the latter to the former.

Following duty in the Solomons and a stop at Pearl Harbor from 5 February to 8 February, Thornton returned to the west coast at Mare Island on 17 February 1944. She stayed on the west coast for the next 10 months, conducting routine operations and undergoing extensive repairs. On December 3, 1944, the warship left San Pedro to return to the western Pacific.

== Fate ==
From mid-December 1944 until late February 1945, Thornton was at Pearl Harbor. On the 22d, she got underway for operations to prepare for the assault on Okinawa. She stopped at Eniwetok early in March, and then moved on to Ulithi, the staging area for Okinawa. On 5 April 1945, while operating in the Ryūkyūs as part of the Search and Reconnaissance Group of the Southern Attack Force, Thornton collided with Ashtabula (AO-51) and Escalante (AO-70). Her starboard side was severely damaged and open to the sea. On 14 April, she was towed into Kerama Retto. On the 29th, a board of inspection and survey recommended that Thornton be decommissioned, beached, stripped of all useful materiel as needed, and then abandoned. She was beached and decommissioned on 2 May 1945. Her name was struck from the Navy List on 13 August 1945. In July 1957, Thornton's hull was abandoned and donated to the government of the Ryukyu Islands.

== Honors and awards ==
- American Defense Service Medal
- Asiatic-Pacific Campaign Medal with three battle stars
- World War II Victory Medal
