= Green Star Line =

Former steamship company

The Green Star Line was an American steamship shipping line created in 1919 and operated until 1923. Established by Irish businessmen as a response to the Shipping Board's campaign urging Americans to buy ships for wealth and patriotism during and after World War I.

== History ==
=== Summary ===
Mr. Joseph Mercadante, who also led the Nafra Steamship company, became a head of the Green Star Line (called the Green Star Steamship Corporation at the time). The Green Star Line initially purchased four steamers from Portland and set up its headquarters in Baltimore. The company initially ran four distinct services: one between Baltimore and the River Plate section of South America, one between Maryland and Bordeaux, one to Shanghai, China, and one to Antwerp and Rotterdam. Although it also ran services to Hamburg and Bremen in Germany, and continued operating the New York to Genoa line that was run by the Nafra Steamship company.

By October 1921 the government and creditors became worried about the debt the company owed the Shipping Board. Green Star Line had bought 9 steam ships from the Shipping Board, and had a total of 18 ships. In February 1923 five of the Green Star line ships were sold in Baltimore for much less than they were worth. The Green Star Line was reorganized into the Planet Steamship Corporation in March 1923. This corporation bought the remainder of the Green Star Line ships. Holders of Green Star Line stock were allowed to trade for stock in the new company.

=== Origin and Nafra Steamship Company ===
Mr. Joseph Mercadante, who also led the Nafra Steamship company, became a head of the Green Star Line. The "Nafra Line", a subsidiary corporation owned and controlled by the Nafra Company, had an enviable record for promptness and efficiency in handling, loading, and discharging ocean-going vessels. The Tidewater and Plymouth were added to the company's initial three vessels and together built a large business. In October 1919, the "Nafra Line" disposed of its vessels to a new organization, the "Green State Steamship Corporation", of which Mr. Joseph Mercadante was also president. This company, which had a capital of $10,000,000, added ten more ships to its fleet and expected to increase it to twenty-two. Mr. Robert McGregor, formerly general manager of the Federal Shipbuilding Company, was vice-president and general manager of the "Green State Steamship Company".

Another subsidiary company of the "Nafra Company" was the "Nafra Stevedoring Company", which performed stevedore work for Nafra steamers at Baltimore. The main ship used for this work was built by Northwest Steel of Portland, Oregon and was launched on 17 November 1919. The ship had been sold to the "Green Star Line" before launching and assigned the name Centaurus. The ship was completed in December 1919, and assigned the United States official number 219283 and Code Letters LTVH.

- 18 January 1920. The newspaper "The Sunday Oregonian", Portland, wrote on page 46;

GREEN STAR WILL PLY ATLANTIC
Four Steamers Purchased Here to Sail From Baltimore.
ORIENTAL RUN PROMISED
Cruft Now Being Built at Standifer Plant Expected to Be Operated on Pacific.
Speculation as to the future field of operations of the Green Star Steamship company, which purchased four steel steamers in Portland and placed orders for the construction of five more, was ended last week by a formal announcement from the headquarters of the company in Baltimore, where the Green Star line has purchased a large building to serve as a home for its shipping enterprises. The last of the steamers purchased by, the line here, the Circlnus, sailed from Astoria Wednesday with a full cargo of lumber for Melbourne and Adelaide, Australia. This cargo amounted to 4.086,103 feet, it is reported by Brown & McCabe, stevedores, who had charge of loading the vessel.
The three other steamers purchased here by the Green Star line are the Corvus, which went in ballast to Arica, Chile, to load nitrates for Europe; the Centaurus, which took a part cargo of lumber here and went to San Francisco to finish a general cargo for the west coast, and the Clauseus, which went from here to San Francisco in ballast to load beans for Hamburg.
Oriental Line Announced.
Considering the company's announcement from Baltimore, little hope is felt that any of these four steamers will return for service on this coast, but the company has also announced the intention of operating a line to the orient and it is presumed that some of the steamers now being built by the G.M. Standifer Construction corporation will be utilized in this service.
The Green Star company has announced that it will inaugurate four distinct and regular services. One line will ply between Baltimore and the River Platte section of South America. Four of the company's large cargo carriers are to be assigned to this service. Another steamship freight service will be maintained between the Maryland port and Bordeaux. Having determined to invade the orient, the company has advised that it will operate to China, with Shanghai as the far eastern terminal. The fourth service will be established to Antwerp and Rotterdam.
Philadelphia will have three lines.
The Green Star line has announced that it will inaugurate services to Hamburg and Bremen, in Germany, and to Trieste, on the Mediterranean. It did not state how frequent the sailings would be and did not indicate the number of ships which would be assigned to the respective lines.
At the present time, the company is continuing the operation of its New York-to-Genoa line which was started by the Nafra company during the war. Inasmuch as Joseph Mercariante, the president of the Green Star line. Is closely identified with the Italian interests, it is believed In shipping circles that there will be ample shipping facilities between the Mediterranean and the United States.
Louis F. Swift Director.
The news of the election of Louis F. Swift to the directorate of the company is regarded as significant, inasmuch as it may indicate that the Chicago packing company will ship its meat products in the vessels operated by the Green Star. While no official of the company has made this statement or has inferred that his election will mean the extension of this favor. It is believed that it will have a favorable effect.
The Green Star line has acquired more than 20 steamers, all of which are under American registry. Joseph Mercadante stated yesterday that "on the completion of its extensive program the Green Star line will be the largest owner of ships of American registry in this country. "He has not revealed what the "extensive program" is.
When the Green Star line has organized the director of its fleet, Robert McGregor, stated that the corporation would not confine its maritime operations to the maintenance of cargo ships. It is known that the company made a proposal a few months ago for the purchase of several of the ex-German passenger vessels.

=== Debt and Planet Steamship Corporation ===
- October 5, 1921. The Milwaukee Journal wrote:

Green Star Line in Hands of Receiver
Washington – Disclosures of a sensation character are expected to follow the appointment Tuesday in New York of a receiver for the Green Star Line Steamship line, of which Josoph Mercadante is the head.
Not only the government and other creditors but also about 2,000 bond-holders in all parts of the country are said to be concerned with the company’s plight. The company had a fleet of eighteen steamers, It was one of the pioneer purchasers of the shipping board vessels.
The Emergency Fleet Corporation is understood to be interested in the affairs of the Green Star line to the extent of $15,000,000. Nine of the company’s steamers were bought from the shipping board. It is understood that on May 31 this company owed the shipping board $5,503,808.03 in amounts due or overdue.

In February 1923, five ships of the Green Star Line were sold at auction at Baltimore for $735,000. This figure was considered too low by shipping experts (NYT, 28 February 1923). The Green Star Line was not officially reorganized until March 1923. A new corporation, the "“Planet Steamship Corp.", bought the remainder of ships owned by the Green Star Line. In September 1923, an official exchange of securities began, allowing holders of "Green Star Line" stock to trade for stock in the new company (NYT, 8 March and 4 September 1923). So the steamers, Circinus and Centaurus, appeared in "Planet Steamship Corp."

== Steamers of the "Green Star Line" ==
- SS Eurana - "Nafra Line" disposed this ship to a new organization, the "Green Star Steamship Corporation".
- SS Tidewater - "Nafra Line" disposed this ship to a new organization, the "Green Star Steamship Corporation".
- SS Plymouth - "Nafra Line" disposed this ship to a new organization, the "Green Star Steamship Corporation".
- SS Centaurus – in this company from November 1919 to 1920.
- SS Circinus – in this company from 1919 to 1923.
- SS Clauseus
- SS Corvus – in this company from 1919 to 1923.
