= Thornton House =

Thornton House may refer to:

== Places in the United States ==
- Thornton House (Little Rock, Arkansas), listed on the NRHP in Arkansas
- Albert E. Thornton House, Atlanta GA, listed on the NRHP in Georgia
- Thornton Plantation, Pine Mountain, GA, listed on the NRHP in Georgia
- Thornton House (Stone Mountain, Georgia), originally constructed circa 1790 in Union Point, Georgia
- Thornton (Chestertown, Maryland), listed on the NRHP in Maryland
- Matthew Thornton House, Derry Village, NH, listed on the NRHP in New Hampshire
- Mansfield Thornton House, Warrenton, NC, listed on the NRHP in North Carolina
- Thornton-Guise Kitchen And House, Munroe Falls, OH, listed on the NRHP in Ohio
- Dr. Penn B. Thornton House, Houston, TX, listed on the NRHP in Texas

== See also ==
- Thornton Hall (disambiguation)
