= Thornton (given name) =

Thornton is a masculine given name borne by:

- Thornton Blackburn (c. 1812–1890), American escaped slave and entrepreneur in Canada
- Thornton W. Burgess (1874–1965), American conservationist, author of children's stories and radio personality
- Thornton Chandler (born 1963), American former National Football League player
- Thornton Chase (1847–1912), Union officer commanding United States Colored Troops during the American Civil War and first western convert to the Baháʼí Faith
- Thornton Leigh Hunt (1810–1873), English journalist, first editor of the British newspaper The Daily Telegraph
- Thornton A. Jenkins (1811–1893), United States Navy rear admiral, chief of the Bureau of Navigation and president of the United States Naval Institute
- Thornton Oakley (1881–1953), American artist and illustrator
- Thornton Wilder (1897–1975), American playwright and novelist
- Thornton Willis (1936–2025), American abstract painter
- Thornton Wilson (1921–1999), American business executive, chairman of the board and chief executive officer of Boeing
