= HMAS Deloraine =

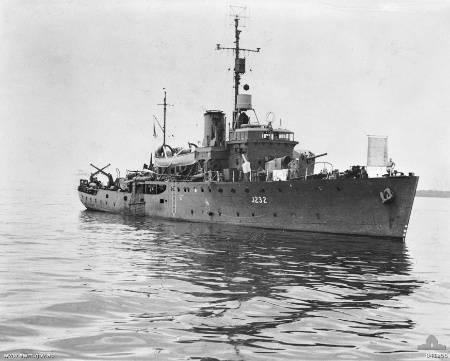
- HMAS Deloraine in 1944

History

Australia
- Namesake: Town of Deloraine, Tasmania
- Builder: Mort's Dock & Engineering Co
- Laid down: 19 March 1941
- Launched: 26 July 1941
- Commissioned: 22 November 1941
- Decommissioned: 30 June 1948
- Honours and awards: Battle honours: Darwin 1942; Pacific 1942–45; New Guinea 1943–44
- Fate: Sold for scrap in 1956
- Badge

General characteristics
- Class & type: Bathurst-class corvette
- Displacement: 650 tons (standard), 1,025 tons (full war load)
- Length: 186 ft (57 m)
- Beam: 31 ft (9.4 m)
- Draught: 8.5 ft (2.6 m)
- Propulsion: triple expansion engine, 2 shafts
- Speed: 15 knots (28 km/h; 17 mph) at 1,750 hp
- Complement: 85
- Armament: 1 × 12-pounder gun (later replaced by 1 × 4 inch Mk XIX gun); 2 × 20 mm Oerlikons (later 2); 1 × 40 mm Bofors (installed later); Machine guns; Depth charges chutes and throwers

HMAS Deloraine (J232/M232), named for the town of Deloraine, Tasmania, was one of 60 Bathurst-class corvettes constructed during World War II, and one of 36 initially manned and commissioned solely by the Royal Australian Navy (RAN). In January 1942 she evaded an attack by the Japanese submarine I-124 north-west of Darwin and was jointly credited with the submarine's sinking after inflicting the initial damage. She was present at the bombing of Darwin and survived unscathed.

== Design and construction ==
In 1938, the Australian Commonwealth Naval Board (ACNB) identified the need for a general purpose 'local defence vessel' capable of both anti-submarine and mine-warfare duties, while easy to construct and operate. The vessel was initially envisaged as having a displacement of approximately 500 tons, a speed of at least 10 knots (19 km/h; 12 mph), and a range of 2,000 nautical miles (3,700 km; 2,300 mi) The opportunity to build a prototype in the place of a cancelled Bar-class boom defence vessel saw the proposed design increased to a 680-ton vessel, with a 15.5 knots (28.7 km/h; 17.8 mph) top speed, and a range of 2,850 nautical miles (5,280 km; 3,280 mi), armed with a 4-inch gun, equipped with asdic, and able to fitted with either depth charges or minesweeping equipment depending on the planned operations: although closer in size to a sloop than a local defence vessel, the resulting increased capabilities were accepted due to advantages over British-designed mine warfare and anti-submarine vessels. Construction of the prototype HMAS Kangaroo did not go ahead, but the plans were retained. The need for locally built 'all-rounder' vessels at the start of World War II saw the "Australian Minesweepers" (designated as such to hide their anti-submarine capability, but popularly referred to as "corvettes") approved in September 1939, with 60 constructed during the course of the war: 36 (including Deloraine) ordered by the RAN, 20 ordered by the British Admiralty but manned and commissioned as RAN vessels, and 4 for the Royal Indian Navy.

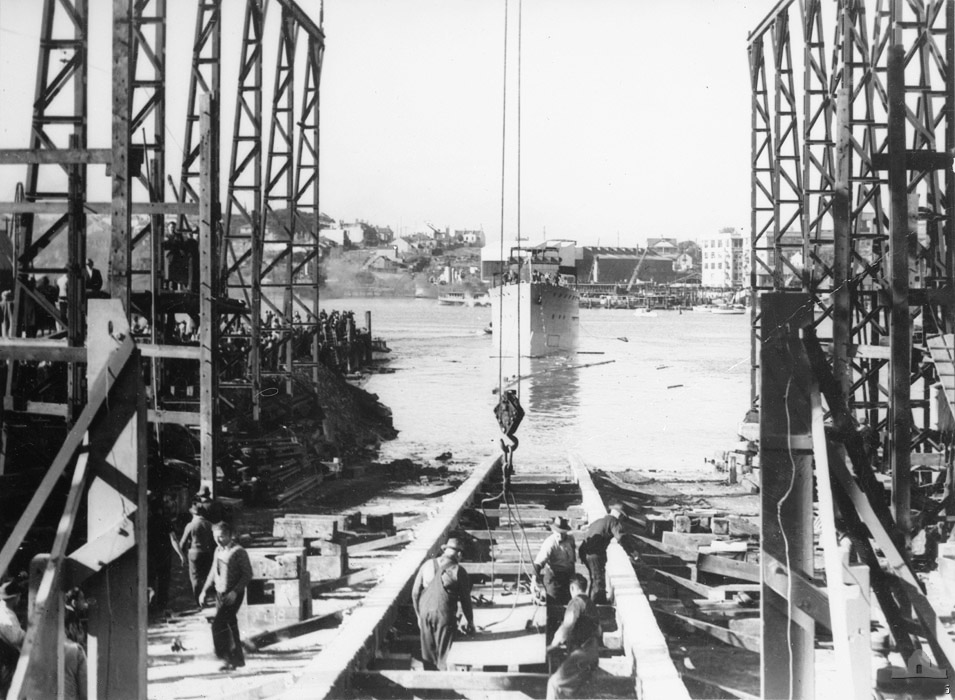
Launching of HMAS Deloraine

Deloraine was laid down at Morts Dock & Engineering Co in Balmain, New South Wales on 19 March 1941. She was launched on 26 July 1941 by Dame Mary Hughes, wife of the Minister for the Navy, and commissioned into the RAN on 22 November 1941.

== Operational history ==
=== World War II ===
After commissioning, Deloraine sailed to Darwin, where she was based for the first part of her career as a convoy escort and anti-submarine patrol vessel. On 20 January 1942, the United States destroyer USS Edsall, escorting the American oiler USS Trinity (AO-13), reported a Japanese submarine was in the area after an unsuccessful attack on the oiler. The submarine, I-124 of the Imperial Japanese Navy, tried and failed to torpedo Deloraine at 1:35 pm, with Deloraine locating the submarine on asdic. After two depth-charge attacks the submarine briefly broke the surface. Deloraine then observed 'large bubbles of oil and air'. Sister ships Katoomba and Lithgow arrived in the area; the two ships continuing to patrol and depth-charge the area while Deloraine reloaded. They were successful, and the four ships were jointly credited with the kill of I-124—the first enemy submarine to be sunk in Australian waters, going down with 80 lives.

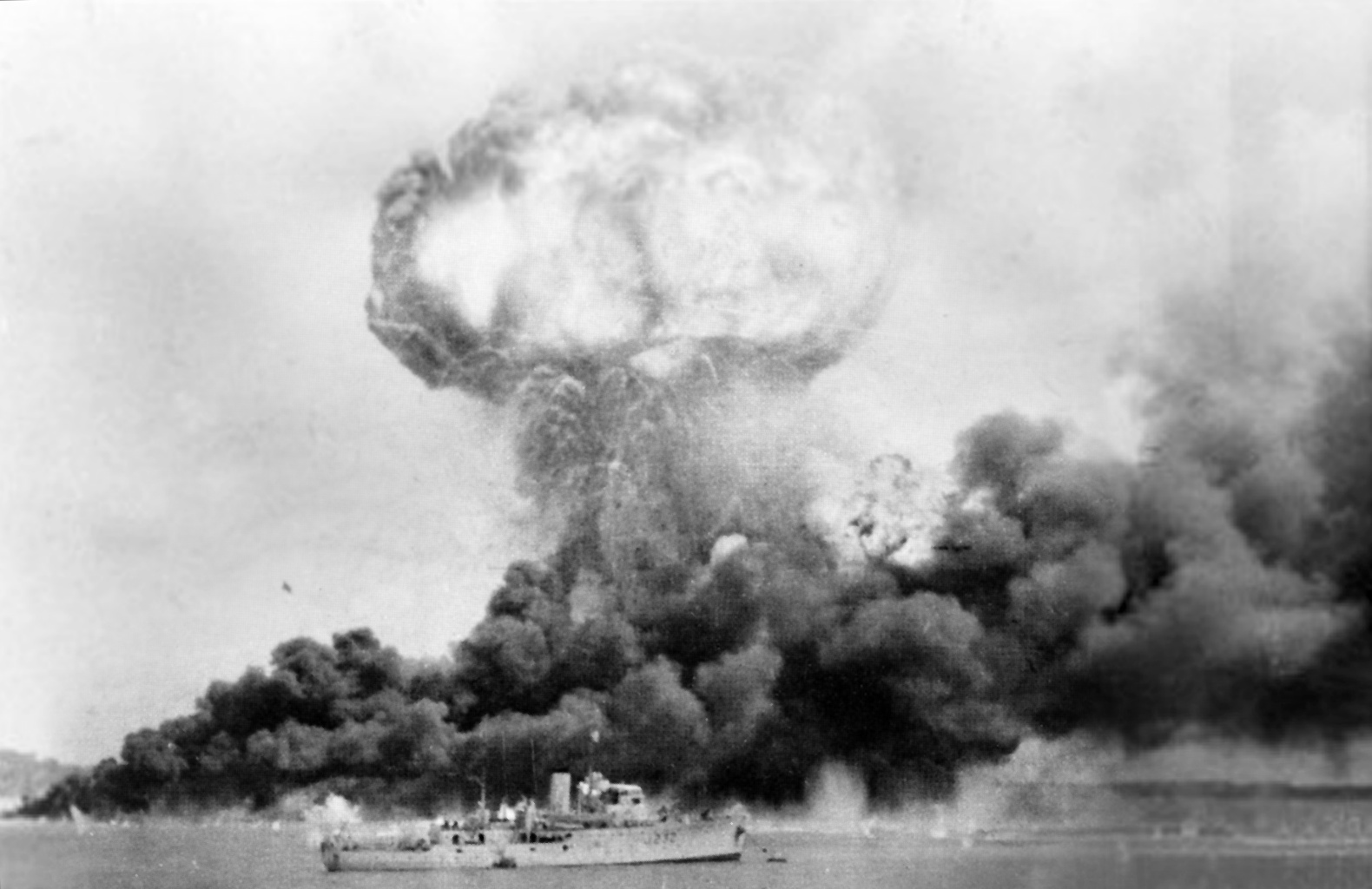
HMAS Deloraine (foreground) during the Japanese air raids on Darwin

The ship was present in Darwin Harbour during the Japanese bombing of Darwin in February 1942. She was undamaged by the attack and assisted in rescue and recovery operations. On 5 March, Deloraine was attacked on several occasions by a Japanese flying boat, but was again undamaged.

In July 1942, the corvette returned to Sydney, and spent the next twenty months escorting supply convoys from Sydney to Newcastle, Brisbane, and New Guinea. In April 1943, Deloraine rescued 19 survivors from the torpedoed merchant ship Lydia M. Child. On 16 June 1943, Portmar and LST-469 were torpedoed and sunk by a Japanese submarine while travelling in Convoy GP55: the only two ships lost in the convoys Deloraine was attached to during her service history.

In May 1944, Deloraine was redeployed to New Guinea waters for escort, patrol, and troop transport duties. She carried out bombardments in support of several Allied landings in New Guinea. At the end of April 1945, the corvette sailed to Brisbane for refits: hostilities ended while she was in dock.

The corvette was awarded three battle honours for her wartime service: "Darwin 1942", "Pacific 1942–45", and "New Guinea 1943–44".

=== Post-war ===
After refitting, Deloraine was used to transport an occupation force from Morotai to Menado, then returned to Sydney and commenced clearing minefields off the New South Wales coast. For the first half of 1946, Deloraine was assigned to New Britain, again clearing minefields. She was paid off into reserve on 4 November 1945, but was recommissioned on 16 December, and recommenced minesweeping duties along the Australian coast.

== Decommissioning and fate ==
Deloraine was paid off into reserve at Fremantle, Western Australia on 30 June 1948. She was sold for scrap to the Hong Kong Delta Shipping Company on 8 August 1956.
