= USS LST-469 =

1943 LST-1-class tank landing ship

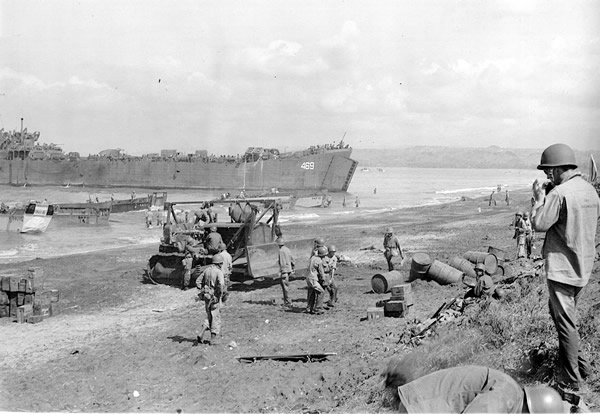
- USS LST-469 during the landing at Lingayen Gulf on 9 January 1945

History

United States
- Name: LST-469
- Ordered: as a Type S3-M-K2 hull, MCE hull 989
- Builder: Kaiser Shipbuilding Company, Vancouver, Washington
- Yard number: 173
- Laid down: 23 October 1942
- Launched: 27 November 1943
- Commissioned: 8 March 1943
- Decommissioned: 27 March 1946
- Stricken: 1 May 1946
- Identification: Hull symbol: LST-469; Code letters: NFVU
- Honors and awards: 4 × battle stars
- Fate: Sold for scrapping, 13 December 1947

General characteristics
- Class & type: LST-1-class tank landing ship
- Displacement: 4,080 long tons (4,145 t) full load; 2,160 long tons (2,190 t) landing
- Length: 328 ft (100 m) oa
- Beam: 50 ft (15 m)
- Draft: Full load: 8 ft 2 in (2.49 m) forward; 14 ft 1 in (4.29 m) aft; Landing at 2,160 t: 3 ft 11 in (1.19 m) forward; 9 ft 10 in (3.00 m) aft
- Installed power: 2 × 900 hp (670 kW) Electro-Motive Diesel 12-567A diesel engines; 1,700 shp (1,300 kW)
- Propulsion: 1 × Falk main reduction gears; 2 × Propellers
- Speed: 12 kn (22 km/h; 14 mph)
- Range: 24,000 nmi (44,000 km; 28,000 mi) at 9 kn (17 km/h; 10 mph) while displacing 3,960 long tons (4,024 t)
- Boats & landing craft carried: 2 or 6 x LCVPs
- Capacity: 2,100 tons oceangoing maximum; 350 tons main deckload
- Troops: 16 officers, 147 enlisted men
- Complement: 13 officers, 104 enlisted men
- Armament: Varied, ultimate armament; 2 × twin 40 mm (1.57 in) Bofors guns; 4 × single 40 mm Bofors guns; 12 × 20 mm (0.79 in) Oerlikon cannons

Service record
- Part of: LST Flotilla 7
- Operations: Hollandia operation (21–25 April 1944); Western New Guinea operations; Toem-Wakde-Sarmi area operation (18–20 and 23–25 May 1944); Biak Islands operation (28–31 May, 3–7, 9–14 June 1944); Noemfoor Island operation (4–10, 12–17, 18–22 July 1944); Cape Sansapor operation (31 July, 6, 8–14 22–28 August 1944); Morotai landing (15 September 1944); Leyte landings (13–27 October, 5–18 November 1944); Lingayen Gulf landings (4–18 January 1945)
- Awards: China Service Medal; American Campaign Medal; Asiatic–Pacific Campaign Medal; World War II Victory Medal; Navy Occupation Service Medal w/Asia Clasp; Philippine Liberation Medal

USS LST-469 was a United States Navy LST-1-class tank landing ship used in the Asiatic-Pacific Theater during World War II. As with many of her class, the ship was never named. Instead, she was referred to by her hull designation.

== Construction ==
The ship was laid down on 23 October 1942, under United States Maritime Commission (MARCOM) contract, MC hull 989, by Kaiser Shipyards, Vancouver, Washington; launched 27 November 1942; and commissioned on 8 March 1943.

== Service history ==
During World War II, LST-469 was assigned to the Asiatic-Pacific theater.

=== Submarine attack ===
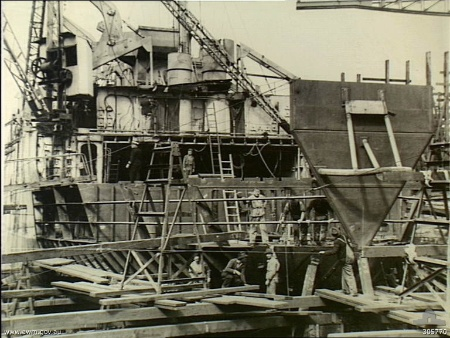
USS LST-469 under repair in August 1943

On 16 June 1943, she was torpedoed by Japanese submarine I-174 while travelling in Convoy GP55 off the east coast of Australia. She was towed to the Cockatoo Island Dockyard, Sydney, where she was repaired in August 1943.

== Pacific operations ==
After being repaired she participated in the following operations, Hollandia operation in April 1944; the Western New Guinea operations, the Toem-Wakde-Sarmi area operation in May 1944, the Biak Islands operation in May and June 1944, the Noemfoor Island operation in July 1944, the Cape Sansapor operation in July and August 1944, and the Morotai landing in September 1944; the Leyte operation in October 1944; and the Lingayen Gulf landings in January 1945.

Following the war, LST-469 performed occupation duty in the Far East until 24 October 1945, and saw China service from 25 October to 2 November 1945. Upon her return to the United States, LST-469 was decommissioned on 27 March 1946, and struck from the Navy Directory on 1 May, that same year. On 13 December 1947, the tank landing ship was sold to Hughes Bros., Inc., New York City, for scrapping.

== Honors and awards ==
LST-469 earned four battle stars for her World War II service.

== Notes ==
Citations

== Bibliography ==
Online resources

- "LST-469". Dictionary of American Naval Fighting Ships. Naval History and Heritage Command. 3 August 2015. This article incorporates text from this source, which is in the public domain.
- "Kaiser Vancouver, Vancouver WA". ShipbuildingHistory.com. 27 November 2010.
- "USS LST-469". NavSource. 1 January 2016.
