= HMAS Bundaberg (J231) =

Bathurst-class corvette

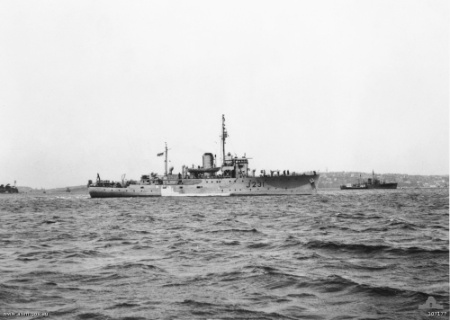
- HMAS Bundaberg in Sydney Harbour during 1942

History

Australia
- Namesake: City of Bundaberg, Queensland
- Builder: Evans Deakin and Company
- Laid down: 7 June 1941
- Launched: 1 December 1941
- Commissioned: 12 September 1942
- Decommissioned: 26 March 1946
- Honours and awards: Battle honours: Pacific 1942–45; New Guinea 1943–44
- Fate: Sold for scrap in 1961
- Badge

General characteristics
- Class & type: Bathurst-class corvette
- Displacement: 650 tons (standard), 1,025 tons (full war load)
- Length: 186 ft (57 m)
- Beam: 31 ft (9.4 m)
- Draught: 8.5 ft (2.6 m)
- Propulsion: triple expansion engine, 2 shafts
- Speed: 15 knots (28 km/h; 17 mph) at 1,750 hp
- Complement: 85
- Armament: 1 × 4-inch Mk XIX gun; 3 × Oerlikon 20 mm cannons; Machine guns; Depth charges chutes and throwers

HMAS Bundaberg (J231/M231), named for the city of Bundaberg, Queensland, was one of 60 Bathurst-class corvettes constructed during World War II, and one of 36 initially manned and commissioned solely by the Royal Australian Navy (RAN).

== Design and construction ==
In 1938, the Australian Commonwealth Naval Board (ACNB) identified the need for a general purpose 'local defence vessel' capable of both anti-submarine and mine-warfare duties, while easy to construct and operate. The vessel was initially envisaged as having a displacement of approximately 500 tons, a speed of at least 10 knots (19 km/h; 12 mph), and a range of 2,000 nautical miles (3,700 km; 2,300 mi) The opportunity to build a prototype in the place of a cancelled Bar-class boom defence vessel saw the proposed design increased to a 680-ton vessel, with a 15.5 knots (28.7 km/h; 17.8 mph) top speed, and a range of 2,850 nautical miles (5,280 km; 3,280 mi), armed with a 4-inch gun, equipped with asdic, and able to fitted with either depth charges or minesweeping equipment depending on the planned operations: although closer in size to a sloop than a local defence vessel, the resulting increased capabilities were accepted due to advantages over British-designed mine warfare and anti-submarine vessels. Construction of the prototype HMAS Kangaroo did not go ahead, but the plans were retained. The need for locally built 'all-rounder' vessels at the start of World War II saw the "Australian Minesweepers" (designated as such to hide their anti-submarine capability, but popularly referred to as "corvettes") approved in September 1939, with 60 constructed during the course of the war: 36 (including Bundaberg) ordered by the RAN, 20 ordered by the British Admiralty but manned and commissioned as RAN vessels, and 4 for the Royal Indian Navy.

Bundaberg was laid down by Evans Deakin and Company at Brisbane on 7 June 1941, launched on 1 December 1941 by Mrs. Hurwood, wife of the Director of Evans Deakin, and commissioned on 12 September 1942.

== Operational history ==
The ship was awarded the battle honours "Pacific 1942–45" and "New Guinea 1943–44" for her service during World War II.

== Fate ==
Bundaberg paid off to reserve on 26 March 1946, and was sold for scrap to the Kinoshita Company of Japan on 6 January 1961.
