= Japanese submarine I-22 =

Japanese submarine I-22 may refer to one of the following submarines of the Imperial Japanese Navy:

- Japanese submarine I-122, an I-121-class submarine launched in 1926 as I-22 and renamed I-122 in June 1938; sunk in the Sea of Japan by the United States Navy submarine USS Skate (SS-305) on 10 June 1945
- Japanese submarine I-22 (1938), a Type C cruiser submarine; sunk in the Coral Sea in October 1942 by a United States Navy Consolidated PBY Catalina aircraft
