= Japanese submarine Ro-34 =

Imperial Japanese Navy Kaichū type submarine of the K5 sub-class

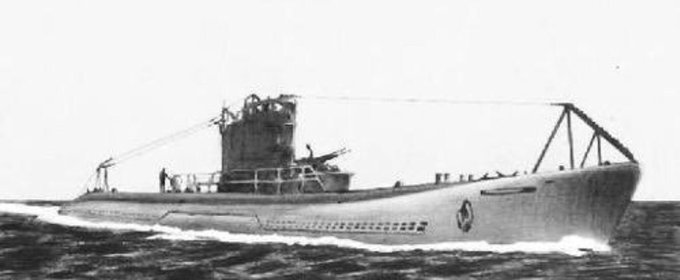

History

Japan
- Name: Ro-34
- Builder: Mitsubishi, Kobe, Japan
- Laid down: 25 April 1934
- Launched: 12 December 1935
- Completed: 31 May 1937
- Commissioned: 31 May 1937
- Decommissioned: 15 November 1939
- Recommissioned: 1 May 1940
- Decommissioned: 15 May 1941
- Recommissioned: ca. mid-November 1941
- Fate: Sunk by USS Strong, 7 April 1943
- Stricken: 14 July 1943

General characteristics
- Class & type: Kaichū type submarine (K6 subclass)
- Displacement: 955 tonnes (940 long tons) surfaced; 1,219 tonnes (1,200 long tons) submerged
- Length: 73 m (239 ft 6 in) overall
- Beam: 6.7 m (22 ft 0 in)
- Draft: 3.25 m (10 ft 8 in)
- Installed power: 3,000 bhp (2,200 kW) (diesel); 1,200 hp (890 kW) (electric motor)
- Propulsion: Diesel-electric; 2 × diesel engine; 2 × electric motor
- Speed: 19 knots (35 km/h; 22 mph) surfaced; 8.25 knots (15.28 km/h; 9.49 mph) submerged
- Range: 8,000 nmi (15,000 km; 9,200 mi) at 12 knots (22 km/h; 14 mph) surfaced; 90 nmi (170 km; 100 mi) at 3.5 knots (6.5 km/h; 4.0 mph) submerged
- Test depth: 75 m (246 ft)
- Crew: 75
- Armament: 4 × bow 533 mm (21 in) torpedo tubes; 1 × 76.2 mm (3.00 in) L/40 anti-aircraft gun; 1 × 13.2 mm (0.52 in) Type 93 anti-aircraft machinegun

Ro-34 was a Kaichū type submarine of the K6 sub-class built for the Imperial Japanese Navy. Completed and commissioned in May 1937, she served in World War II, operating in the South China Sea and the Netherlands East Indies, off New Guinea, and in the Solomon Islands. She was sunk in April 1943 during her eleventh war patrol.

== Design and description ==
The submarines of the K5 sub-class were versions of the preceding KT sub-class with greater surface speed. They displaced 955 tonnes (940 long tons) surfaced and 1,219 tonnes (1,200 long tons) submerged. The submarines were 73 meters (239 ft 6 in) long, had a beam of 6.7 meters (22 ft 0 in) and a draft of 3.25 meters (10 ft 8 in). They had a diving depth of 75 meters (246 ft).

For surface running, the boats were powered by two 1,450-brake-horsepower (1,081 kW) diesel engines, each driving one propeller shaft. When submerged each propeller was driven by a 600-horsepower (447 kW) electric motor. They could reach 19 knots (35 km/h; 22 mph) on the surface and 8.25 knots (15.28 km/h; 9.49 mph) underwater. On the surface, the K5s had a range of 8,000 nautical miles (15,000 km; 9,200 mi) at 12 knots (22 km/h; 14 mph); submerged, they had a range of 90 nmi (170 km; 100 mi) at 3.5 knots (6.5 km/h; 4.0 mph).

The boats were armed with four internal bow 53.3 cm (21.0 in) torpedo tubes and carried a total of ten torpedoes. They were also armed with a single 76.2 mm (3.00 in) L/40 anti-aircraft gun and one 13.2 mm (0.52 in) Type 93 anti-aircraft machinegun.

== Construction and commissioning ==
Given the name Ro-34 on 21 April 1934, Ro-34 was laid down on 25 April 1934 by Mitsubishi at Kobe, Japan, as the second and last submarine of the Ro-33 class. She was launched on 12 December 1935 and was completed and commissioned on 31 May 1937.

== Service history ==
=== Pre-World War II ===
Upon commissioning, Ro-34 was attached to the Sasebo Naval District and assigned to the new Submarine Division 21 along with her sister ship Ro-33. On 9 April 1938 she got underway from Sasebo, Japan, for a training cruise in southern Chinese waters with Ro-33 that concluded with their arrival at Kīrun, Formosa, on 14 April 1938. Submarine Division 21 was reassigned to the Combined Fleet on 15 December 1938 and to Submarine Squadron 2 in the 2nd Fleet on 8 April 1939.

In August 1939, Ro-34 departed Yokosuka, Japan, to conduct a research cruise to Saipan in the Mariana Islands with the commander of Submarine Division 21 and a nutritionist from Tokyo Imperial University embarked. The scientific aims of the cruise were to study the effect on the crew′s health of prolonged confinement aboard the submarine and of the crew′s diet while on board. Dysentery broke out among the crew during the voyage, necessitating dietary changes. Ro-34 returned to Yokosuka at the conclusion of the cruise. Ro-34 was placed in the Second Reserve in the Sasebo Naval District on 15 November 1939.

Ro-34 returned to active service on 1 May 1940, with Submarine Division 21 reassigned to Submarine Squadron 5 in the 4th Fleet. She departed Sasebo on 16 May 1940 for a lengthy training cruise with Ro-33 in the Caroline Islands, Marshall Islands, and Mariana Islands which concluded with their arrival at Yokosuka on 22 September 1940. She participated in a naval review at Yokohama, Japan, on 11 October 1940. Submarine Division 21 was reassigned to Submarine Squadron 4 on 15 November 1940.

Ro-33 and Ro-34 were placed in Third Reserve at Sasebo, Japan, on 15 May 1941, and while in reserve Ro-33 relieved Ro-34 as flagship of Submarine Division 21 on 21 May 1941. From mid-October through early November 1941 Ro-33 and Ro-34 underwent repairs and a refit at Maizuru Naval Arsenal in Maizuru, Japan. After the work was complete, the two submarines returned to active service, probably in mid-November 1941.

=== World War II ===
The Pacific Campaign of World War II began on 7 December 1941 (8 December 1941 in East Asia) with the Japanese attack on Pearl Harbor, Hawaii. At 16:00 on 18 December 1941, Submarine Division 21 — Ro-33 and Ro-34 — departed Sasebo bound for Cam Ranh Bay in Japanese-occupied French Indochina, which Ro-33 reached on 24 December 1941. During her stay at Cam Ranh Bay, she refueled from the depot ship Nagoya Maru and her crew was granted three days of shore leave.

==== First war patrol ====
On 28 December 1941, Ro-34 got underway from Cam Ranh Bay to begin her first war patrol, assigned an operating area in the Karimata Strait in support of the Japanese invasion of British Malaya. Her patrol was uneventful, and she returned to Cam Ranh Bay on 11 January 1942.

==== Second war patrol ====
On 31 January 1942, Ro-34 departed Cam Ranh Bay for her second war patrol, bound for a patrol area in the Java Sea at the northern entrance of the Lombok Strait. She received orders on 2 February 1942 to move to a new patrol area at the northern entrance of the Sunda Strait. On 5 February 1942, she was in the Java Sea northeast of the Sunda Strait when she sighted an Allied task force consisting of the Royal Navy heavy cruiser HMS Exeter, the Royal Australian Navy light cruiser HMAS Hobart, and the Royal Navy destroyer HMS Encounter, which her commanding officer misidentified as a convoy of merchant ships escorted by a cruiser and a destroyer. Ro-34 made an unsuccessful approach for an attack but fired four torpedoes anyway at the nearest ship, Encounter. All missed, but Ro-34′s sound operator reported hearing four hits, apparently mistaking the sound of exploding depth charges for the detonation of the torpedoes, and Ro-34′s commanding officer erroneously claimed to have sunk a destroyer. After a brief counterattack by the ships, Ro-34 escaped unscathed.

While Ro-34 was at sea, Submarine Division 21 was reassigned to Submarine Group A on 9 February 1942. Out of torpedoes, and with the submarine I-55 relieving her on station, Ro-34 received orders to return to Cam Ranh Bay, which she reached on 20 February 1942.

==== Third war patrol ====
Ro-34 began her third war patrol on 27 February 1942, putting to sea from Cam Ranh Bay bound for a patrol area in the Indian Ocean south of Java and southeast of the Lombok Strait and Tjilatjap, Java, to support the upcoming Japanese invasion of Java. In early March 1942, she was on the surface off Noesa Kembang lighthouse on Kambangan Island south of Tjilatjap when she sighted a patrolling Allied corvette. When she submerged to avoid the corvette, she became entangled in a net — either an antisubmarine net or a fishing net — at a depth of 100 feet (30 m). During several attempts to break free, she depleted her batteries, and after sunset her commanding officer ordered her to surface and engage the corvette with her deck gun. She broke free of the net in the process of surfacing, and came to the surface in the midst of group of fishing boats. The corvette had left the area, as did Ro-34, recharging her batteries while heading out to sea at flank speed. She concluded her patrol with her arrival at Staring Bay on the coast of Celebes in the Netherlands East Indies on 7 March 1942.

==== March–April 1942 ====
On 10 March 1942, Submarine Squadron 4 was disbanded, and Submarine Division 21 — Ro-33 and Ro-34 — was reassigned to Submarine Squadron 6 in the 4th Fleet, and on 20 March 1942 Ro-34 relieved Ro-33 as flagship of Submarine Division 21. The two submarines departed Staring Bay on 22 March 1942, called at Palau from 26 to 30 March 1942, and then headed for Truk, which they reached on 3 April 1942. On 4 April 1942, Submarine Division 21 was reassigned to the South Seas Force. Submarine Squadron 4 was disbanded on 10 April 1942, and that day Submarine Division 21 was reassigned to Submarine Squadron 7 in the 4th Fleet. The two submarines departed Truk on 15 April 1942, and on 18 April 1942 they arrived at Rabaul on New Britain.

==== Fourth war patrol ====
Ro-34 departed Rabaul on 19 April 1942 to begin her third war patrol, with orders to conduct a reconnaissance of anchorages and transit routes in the Deboyne Islands and the Jomard Channel and at Rossel Island. She returned to Rabaul on 24 April 1942.

==== Fifth war patrol — Operation Mo ====
On 1 May 1942, Ro-33 relieved Ro-34 as flagship of Submarine Division 21, and that day Ro-34 departed Rabaul to begin her fifth war patrol, bound along with Ro-33 for the Coral Sea off Port Moresby on the southeastern coast of New Guinea to support Operation Mo, a planned Japanese invasion of Tulagi in the Solomon Islands and Port Moresby. While they were en route, the Battle of the Coral Sea began on 4 May 1942 as Allied forces moved to block the Japanese offensive. As the battle continued, the two submarines arrived off Port Moresby on 5 May 1942. The Japanese seized Tulagi and were turned back from Port Moresby, and when Operation Mo was cancelled on 19 May 1942, Ro-34 departed her patrol area to proceed to Truk, where she met Ro-33.

==== May–July 1942 ====
On 23 May 1942, Ro-33 and Ro-34 departed Truk bound for Sasebo, where they arrived on 30 May 1944. Both submarines underwent repairs and an overhaul at Sasebo, and after the work was completed, they left Sasebo on 9 July 1942, called at Truk from 17 to 23 July 1942, and proceeded to Rabaul, arriving there on 27 July 1942.

==== Sixth war patrol ====
On 29 July 1942, Ro-34 began her sixth war patrol, putting to sea from Rabaul to head for a patrol area in the Coral Sea off the Cape York Peninsula in northeastern Australia. After World War II, some Japanese historians credited her with attacking the Australian troopship Katoomba on 4 August 1942, but it was the submarine I-32 that actually made that attack.

On 7 August 1942, Ro-34 was headed back to Rabaul after a quiet patrol when the Guadalcanal campaign began with U.S. amphibious landings on Guadalcanal, Tulagi, Florida Island, Gavutu, and Tanambogo in the southeastern Solomon Islands. That day, the 8th Fleet ordered Ro-33, Ro-34, and the submarines I-121, I-122, and I-123 to proceed to Indispensable Strait off Guadalcanal, conduct a reconnaissance of the areas U.S. forces had captured, and contact Japanese forces on the islands.

Ro-34 arrived off Tulagi on 10 August 1942. At 18:00 on 12 August 1942, she contacted Japanese forces at Taivu Point on Guadalcanal′s northern coast, then briefly bombarded United States Marine Corps positions at Lungga Point, also on the northern coast of Guadalcanal, with her deck gun. She returned to Rabaul on 16 August 1942.

==== Seventh war patrol ====
Ro-34 put to sea from Rabaul on 21 August 1942 to begin her seventh war patrol, ordered to conduct a reconnaissance of the Guadalcanal area. While she was at sea, she was reassigned to Submarine Squadron 7 in the Advance Force on 22 August 1942, and on 23 August she received orders to attack an Allied supply convoy — the United States Navy attack cargo ships USS Alhena (AK-26) and USS Fomalhaut (AK-22) — which Japanese forces had reported arriving at Guadalcanal on 22 August.

Ro-34 approached the anchorage at Lungga Roads off Lungga Point on the evening of 23 August 1942 and sighted what her commanding officer identified as a 10,000-ton transport unloading there and a destroyer and a corvette conducting defensive patrols. At 18:27, Ro-34 fired two torpedoes at the transport and her crew heard an explosion, prompting her commanding officer to claim that she had sunk a transport. A nearby Imperial Japanese Army observation post identified her target as a destroyer, which may have been the fast transport USS Stringham (APD-6), which reported dodging a torpedo a submarine had fired at her and then counterattacking the submarine. Both of Ro-34′s torpedoes missed, and one of them later was found on a beach on the coast of Guadalcanal. With Allied ships in pursuit, Ro-34 headed out to sea, undergoing heavy depth-charging during an 18-nautical-mile (33 km; 21 mi) chase. The depth charges knocked out her internal lighting and caused her to take a 15-degree up-angle, but she broke contact and escaped with little damage except for a leak in one periscope shaft.

Ro-34 looked for Allied shipping in the harbor at Tulagi on 26 August 1942. At 01:34 on 28 August 1942, she was on the surface when she sighted what she identified as a U.S. Navy submarine moving slowly on the surface off Cape Esperance on the northwestern coast of Guadalcanal. She submerged and fired two torpedoes, subsequently hearing two explosions and claiming to have sunk the submarine. Early on the morning of 29 August 1942, she was ordered to patrol east of Savo Island, and between 09:00 and 11:00 that day heard a series of distant explosions, probably from the sinking of I-123 by the U.S. Navy destroyer minelayer USS Gamble (DM-15). Ro-34 returned to Rabaul on 6 September 1942.

==== Eighth war patrol ====
Ro-34 began her eighth war patrol on 27 September 1943, headed for a patrol area off Port Moresby. While she was on patrol, Submarine Division 21 was disbanded on 5 October 1942, and she was reassigned directly to Submarine Squadron 7 headquarters that day. On 6 October 1942, she received orders to make her best speed toward Rossel Island. She concluded her patrol with her return to Rabaul on 9 October 1942.

==== October–November 1942 ====
On 12 October 1942, Ro-34 departed Rabaul and set course for Truk. At Truk, she picked up underwater access tubes and deck mountings for midget submarines, and departed on 29 October 1942 to carry the equipment to an anchorage in the Shortland Islands off Shortland Island, where larger submarines were to use them while serving as mother ships in a planned midget submarine campaign against Allied ships off Guadalcanal. She called at Shortland from 1 to 2 November 1942 to unload the tubes and fittings, then headed for Rabaul, which she reached on 3 November 1942.

==== Ninth war patrol ====
Ro-34 got underway from Rabaul on 7 November 1942 for her ninth war patrol, ordered to patrol northeast of San Cristobal in the Solomon Islands and join the submarines I-172 and I-175 in attacking Allied reinforcement convoys headed to and from Guadalcanal. Her patrol was uneventful, and she concluded it with her arrival at Truk on 27 November 1942.

==== December 1942–February 1943 ====
Ro-34 departed Truk on 1 December 1942 and set course for Sasebo, where she arrived on 9 December 1942 and began an overhaul. During a diving test in mid-January 1943, her battery flooded, causing the release of chlorine gas, which poisoned several electricians. After completion of the overhaul, she departed Sasebo on 20 February 1943 and proceeded to Rabaul, which she reached on 4 March 1943. Upon arrival, she was reassigned to Submarine Division 13 in Submarine Squadron 7 in the 8th Fleet.

==== Tenth war patrol ====
On 9 March 1943, Ro-34 departed Rabaul on her tenth war patrol, heading for a patrol area in the Solomon Islands off Tulagi. After an uneventful patrol, she returned to Rabaul on 28 March 1943.

==== Eleventh war patrol ====
After the Combined Fleet initiated Operation I-Go — a reinforcement of the 11th Air Fleet base at Rabaul by planes from the aircraft carriers Zuikaku and Zuihō and of the Japanese naval air base on Balalae Island in the Shortland Islands by planes from the aircraft carriers Hiyō and Jun'yō — Ro-34 departed Rabaul at 12:00 on 2 April 1943 for her eleventh war patrol, bound for an operating area east of the Russell Islands in the Solomon Islands, where she was to provide weather reports in support of the operation and perform lifeguard duty for any aviators forced down at sea.

Ro-34 was on the surface 40 nautical miles (74 km; 46 mi) off the Russell Islands in the predawn darkness of 5 April 1943 when the U.S. Navy destroyers USS O'Bannon (DD-450) and USS Strong (DD-467) detected her on radar at 02:18 at a range of 9,350 yards (8,550 m). O'Bannon closed the range rapidly, sighted Ro-34 at 02:30, and prepared to ram her, but O′Bannon′s commanding officer, fearing that Ro-34 might be a minelayer, ordered O′Bannon to make a hard turn at the last minute to avoid a collision. O′Bannon passed Ro-34 at such close range that her guns could not depress enough to fire at the submarine. A U.S. Navy legend later held that O′Bannon′s crew instead threw potatoes at crewmen on Ro-34′s deck to keep them from manning their guns in what became known as the "Maine potato episode"; the story later was found to be apocryphal, but it nonetheless has been reported as fact in various historical accounts and on commemorative plaques, and it remains widely believed.

While Ro-34 began a crash-dive, O′Bannon pulled away to a range of 1,000 yards (910 m) and opened fire with her 5-inch (127 mm) guns, as did Strong, which also had arrived on the scene. The destroyer crews reported that they saw at least one shell hit Ro-34 before she submerged. O′Bannon closed the range again, and after passing less than 100 yards (91 m) ahead of the submerged Ro-34 fired depth charges from her K-gun depth-charge throwers. The destroyers then lost contact with Ro-34.

At 03:19, O′Bannon regained sonar contact on Ro-34 and dropped a pattern of eight depth charges. O′Bannon′s crew subsequently reported seeing Ro-34 on the surface sinking by the stern, observed an oil slick on the surface after sunrise, and claimed a Japanese submarine sunk at 08°15′S 158°58′E. Some historians have credited O′Bannon with sinking Ro-34, but Ro-34 survived the encounter.

==== Loss ====
Ro-34 was on the surface off San Cristobal on the evening of 7 April 1943 when Strong again made radar contact on her at 21:51 Lima Time at a range of 9,350 yards (8,550 m) bearing 150 degrees true from Strong. Strong closed the range and illuminated Ro-34 with her searchlights, then opened fire with her 5-inch (127 mm) guns and 40mm and 20mm antiaircraft guns. She scored at least three 5-inch (127 mm) shell hits, and Ro-34 assumed a 10-to-15-degree down-angle by the stern and submerged. Strong dropped two patterns of depth charges and her crew observed debris rising to the surface at 10°05′S 162°08′E, marking the sinking of Ro-34.

On 16 April 1943, Ro-34 was ordered to return to Rabaul, but she did not acknowledge the order. On 2 May 1943, the Imperial Japanese Navy declared her to be presumed lost in the Solomon Islands with her entire crew of 66. The Japanese struck her from the Navy list on 14 July 1943.
