= Japanese submarine I-123 =

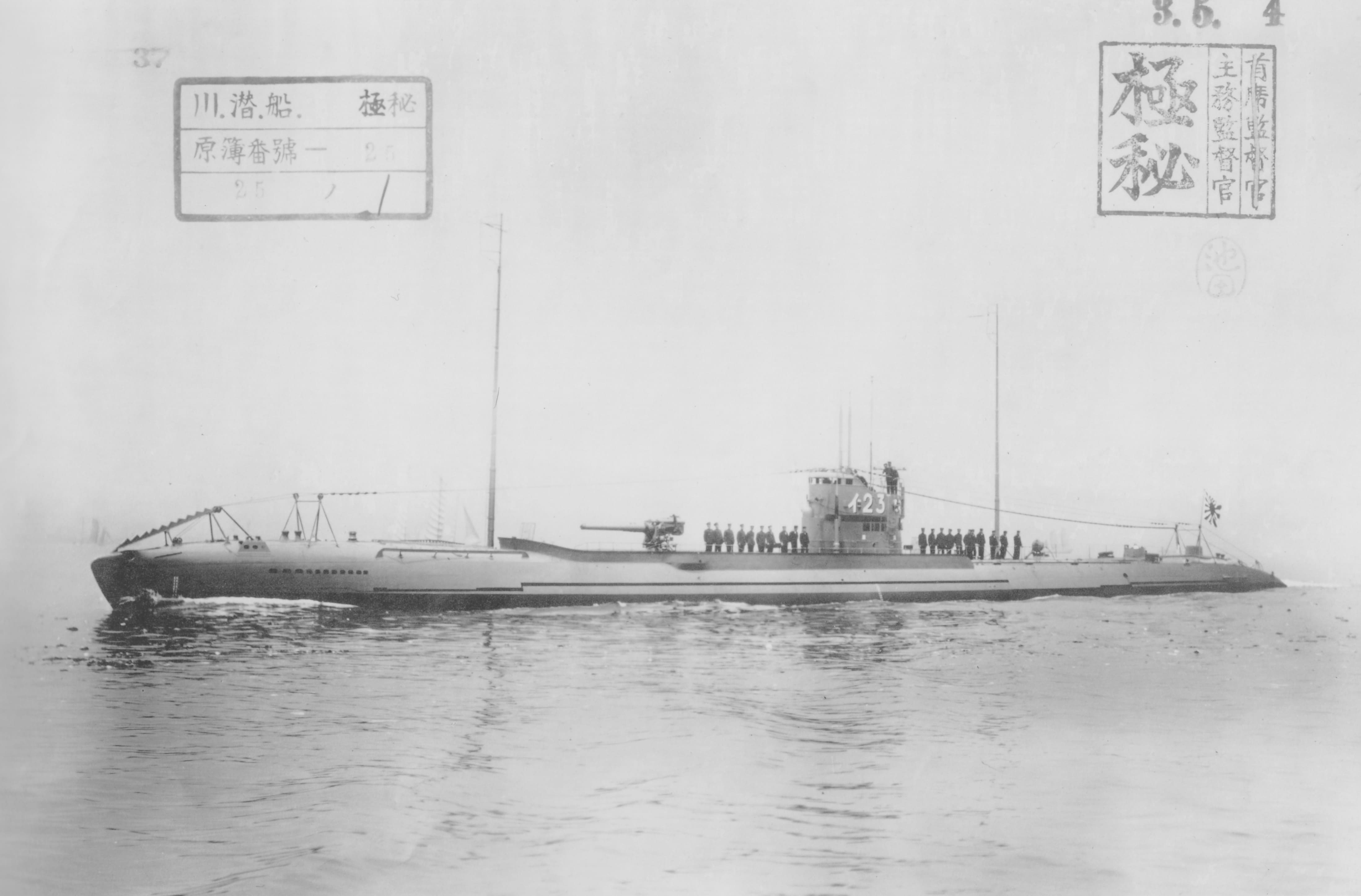
- I-123 departing on her maiden voyage, 28 April 1928

History

Imperial Japanese Navy
- Name: Submarine No. 50
- Builder: Kawasaki Corporation, Kobe, Japan
- Laid down: 12 June 1925
- Launched: 19 March 1927
- Renamed: I-23 on 19 March 1927
- Completed: 28 April 1928
- Commissioned: 28 April 1928
- Decommissioned: 25 May or 25 November 1935 (see text)
- Recommissioned: 26 December 1935
- Renamed: I-123 on 17 June 1938
- Decommissioned: 1 April 1939
- Recommissioned: 1 May 1940
- Fate: Sunk by USS Gamble in Indispensable Strait, 29 August 1942
- Stricken: 5 October 1942

General characteristics
- Class & type: I-121-class submarine
- Displacement: 1,142 long tons (1,160 t) surfaced; 1,768 long tons (1,796 t) submerged
- Length: 85.20 m (279 ft 6 in) overall
- Beam: 7.52 m (24 ft 8 in)
- Draft: 4.42 m (14 ft 6 in)
- Propulsion: 2 × Rauschenbach Mk.1 diesels; 2,400 bhp surfaced; 1,100 shp submerged; 2 shafts
- Speed: 14.9 knots (27.6 km/h; 17.1 mph) surfaced; 6.5 knots (12.0 km/h; 7.5 mph) submerged
- Range: 10,500 nmi (19,400 km; 12,100 mi) at 8 knots (15 km/h; 9.2 mph) surfaced; 40 nmi (74 km; 46 mi) at 4.5 knots (8.3 km/h; 5.2 mph) submerged
- Test depth: 75 m (246 ft) (as built); 55 m (180 ft) (from 1936)
- Complement: 80
- Armament: 2 × 533 mm (21 in) torpedo tubes; 12 × 6th Year Type torpedoes; 1 × 14 cm/40 11th Year Type naval gun; 42 × naval mines

I-123, originally named Submarine No. 50 then renamed I-23 from before her construction began until June 1938, was an I-121-class submarine of the Imperial Japanese Navy that served during the Second Sino-Japanese War and World War II. During the latter conflict, she conducted operations in support of the Japanese invasion of the Philippines, the Battle of Midway, the Guadalcanal campaign, and the Battle of the Eastern Solomons. She was sunk in 1942.

After she was renumbered I-123 in 1938, the designation I-23 was reassigned to a later submarine which also served during World War II.

== Design ==
I-123 and her three sister ships — I-21 (later renumbered I-121), I-22 (later renumbered I-122), and I-24 (later renumbered I-124) — were the Imperial Japanese Navy's only submarine minelayers. They were known in Japan by the type name Kirai Fusetsu Sensuikan (機雷敷設潜水艦, minelaying submarine), commonly shortened to "Kiraisen"-type submarine (機雷潜型潜水艦, Kiraisen-gata sensuikan).

The Kiraisen-type design was based on that of the Imperial German Navy minelaying submarine SM UB-125, a Type UB III submarine which was the largest of seven German submarines transferred to Japan as a war reparation after World War I and served in the Imperial Japanese Navy as O-6 from 1920 to 1921. Like UB-125, the Kiraisen-type submarines had two diesel engines producing a combined 2,400 horsepower (1,790 kW), could carry 42 mines, and had four torpedo tubes and a single 5.5-inch (140 mm) deck gun on the Japanese submarines in contrast to a 5.9-inch (150 mm) gun on UB-125. Compared to the German submarine, they were larger — 10 feet (3 m) longer, and displacing 220 more tons on the surface and 300 more tons submerged — and had a longer range both on the surface — 970 nautical miles (1,800 km; 1,120 mi) farther at 8 knots (15 km/h; 9.2 mph) — and submerged — 5 nautical miles (9.3 km; 5.8 mi) farther at 4.5 knots (8.3 km/h; 5.2 mph). They were 0.2 knots (0.37 km/h; 0.23 mph) slower than UB-125 both surfaced and submerged, carried two fewer torpedoes, and had could dive to only 200 feet (61 m) compared to 250 feet (76 m) for UB-125.

== Construction and commissioning ==
Built by Kawasaki at Kobe, Japan, I-123 was ordered with the name Submarine No. 50, and her keel was laid on 12 June 1925. She was launched on 19 March 1927 and was renumbered I-23 that day. She was completed and commissioned on 28 April 1928.

== Service history ==
=== 1928–1937 ===
Upon commissioning, I-23 was attached to the Yokosuka Naval District and assigned to Submarine Division 9 in the Yokosuka Defense Division in the district. On 11 December 1933, Submarine Division 9 was reassigned to the Yokosuka Guard Squadron in the Yokosuka Naval District.

While I-23 and her sister ship I-24 were conducting deep diving trials on 25 May 1935, I-24 suffered damage to her main ballast tanks. Either on that day or on 25 November 1935,. according to different sources, I-23 was decommissioned and placed in reserve to have her main ballast tanks reinforced. She was recommissioned on 26 December 1935 after the work was completed, but in 1936 all four submarines of her class had their designed diving depth limited to 180 feet (55 m). Meanwhile, Submarine Division 9 was reassigned to the Yokosuka Defense Squadron in the Yokosuka Naval District on 15 November 1935.

=== Second Sino-Japanese War ===
On 7 July 1937 the first day of the Marco Polo Bridge Incident took place, beginning the Second Sino-Japanese War. In September 1937, Submarine Division 9, consisting of I-23 and I-24, moved to a base at Qingdao, China, and began operations in northern Chinese waters as part of a Japanese blockade of China. On 1 December 1937, Submarine Division 13 was assigned to Submarine Squadron 3 in the 4th Fleet, a component of the Combined Fleet, and in December 1937, the light cruiser Kuma arrived at Qingdao to serve as flagship of Submarine Squadron 3, which consisted of Submarine Division 13 (made up of I-21 and I-22) as well as Submarine Division 9 (I-23 and I-24).

I-23 was renumbered I-123 on 1 June 1938, freeing up her previous number for the new submarine I-23, whose keel was laid in 1939. On 20 June 1938, Submarine Division 9 was assigned to the Gunnery School in the Yokosuka Naval District. In an effort to reduce international tensions over the conflict in China, Japan withdrew its submarines from Chinese waters in December 1938.

=== 1939–1941 ===
On 1 April 1939, Submarine Division 9 was placed in the Third Reserve in the Yokosuka Naval District, and it moved to the Second Reserve in the district on 15 November 1939. While in reserve, I-123 and all three of her sister ships — which, like her, had been renumbered on 1 June 1938, I-21 becoming I-121, I-22 becoming I-122, and I-24 becoming I-124 — underwent conversion into a submarine tankers. Retaining their minelaying and torpedo capabilities, they were modified so that each of them could carry 15 tons of aviation gasoline with which to refuel flying boats, allowing the flying boats to extend their range during reconnaissance and bombing missions by meeting the submarines in harbors and lagoons for more fuel.

On 1 May 1940, I-123 returned to active service in Submarine Division 9, which was assigned that day to Submarine Squadron 5 in the 4th Fleet. She soon began a lengthy training cruise in the Pacific in company with I-121, I-122, and I-124: The four submarines departed Sasebo, Japan, on 16 May 1940 and visited the waters of the Caroline Islands, Marshall Islands, and Mariana Islands before concluding their cruise with their arrival at Yokosuka, Japan, on 22 September 1940. On 11 October 1940, I-123 was one of 98 Imperial Japanese Navy ships that gathered along with more than 500 aircraft on the Japanese coast at Yokohama Bay for an Imperial fleet review — the largest fleet review in Japanese history — in honor of the 2,600th anniversary of the enthronement of the Emperor Jimmu, Japan's legendary first emperor.

Submarine Division 9 was reassigned directly to the Yokosuka Naval District on 15 November 1940. On 1 May 1941, the division was assigned to Submarine Squadron 6 in the 3rd Fleet, component of the Combined Fleet, and I-123 and I-124 were based at Kure. I-123 became the flagship of Submarine Division 9 on 2 August 1941. In November 1941, as the Imperial Japanese Navy began to deploy in preparation for the impending conflict in the Pacific, I-123 departed Yokosuka, Japan, and made for Samah on Hainan Island in China, which she reached on 27 November 1941.

=== World War II ===
==== First war patrol ====
On 1 December 1941, I-123 departed Samah along with I-124 to begin what would become her first war patrol. Attached to the Philippines Seizure Force, the two submarines proceeded to the Philippines to support the impending Japanese invasion there. While at sea, I-123 received the message "Climb Mount Niitaka 1208" (Japanese: Niitakayama nobore 1208) from the Combined Fleet on 2 December 1941, indicating that war with the Allies would commence on 8 December 1941 Japan time (7 December 1941 on the other side of the International Date Line in Hawaii, where the war would begin with Japan's attack on Pearl Harbor).

At 04:20 on 6 December 1941, I-123 suffered a foreplane failure that prevented her from submerging for the remainder of her patrol. She nonetheless laid forty Type 88 Mark 1 mines in Balabac Strait on 7 December 1941, then proceeded to Cam Ranh Bay in Japanese-occupied French Indochina for repairs. The crippled submarine was still en route when the Pacific campaign of World War II began in East Asia on 8 December 1941, but she arrived safely at Cam Ranh Bay on 9 December 1941, completing her first war patrol.

It is possible that the minefield I-123 laid in Balabac Strait sank the United States Navy submarine USS Flier (SS-250) on 13 August 1944.

==== Second war patrol ====
With her foreplanes again functional, I-123 set out from Cam Ranh Bay on 15 December 1941 to begin her second war patrol, bound for the Java Sea. At 20:53 on 18 December 1941 she unsuccessfully attacked an Allied transport in the Celebes Sea. On 22 December 1941, she reported sighting two aircraft carriers in the Java Sea. She laid mines off the northern entrance to the harbor at Surabaya, Java, between 02:46 and 05:26 on 23 December 1941. Reassigned along with I-121, I-122, and I-124 to Submarine Group A on 26 December 1941, I-123 concluded her patrol on 31 December 1941 with her arrival at newly captured Davao on Mindanao in the Philippines, where she met I-121, I-124, and the submarine tender Chōgei.

==== Third war patrol ====
I-123 departed Davao on 10 January 1942 to begin her third war patrol, bound for the Beagle Gulf-Van Diemen Gulf area off the northern coast of Australia. She arrived off the western entrance of Clarence Strait off Australia's Northern Territory on 18 January 1942. She was in the Beagle Gulf 40 nautical miles (74 km; 46 mi) west of Darwin, Australia, on the morning of 20 January 1942 when she sighted the U.S. Navy oiler USS Trinity (AO-13) heading toward Darwin escorted by the destroyers USS Alden (DD-211) and USS Edsall (DD-219). Misidentifying Trinity as a transport, I-123 fired four Type 89 torpedoes at Trinity at 12°05′30″S 130°05′36″E after 05:20. The sound man aboard I-123 reported hearing one torpedo hit Trinity, but all four torpedoes missed, although Trinity had sighted three of them and reported the attack. Alden conducted a brief depth charge attack at 05:41 before losing sound contact on I-123, which escaped unscathed. That evening after 20:46, I-123 laid 30 mines in Dundas Strait off Cape Don on the Northern Territory's Cobourg Peninsula. She then returned to Davao, ending her patrol with her arrival there on 3 February 1942.

==== Fourth war patrol ====
After replenishment and repairs by Chōgei, I-123 put to sea from Davao on 19 February 1942 to begin her fourth war patrol, tasked with laying mines in Torres Strait between New Guinea and Australia. She arrived in her patrol area there on 25 February 1942, replacing I-122, which had departed the area to meet Chōgei for replenishment at Staring Bay on the coast of Celebes. That night, I-123 laid 40 mines 80 nautical miles (150 km; 92 mi) west of Booby Island. Her patrol otherwise was uneventful, and it ended with her arrival at Staring Bay, where she paused from 9 to 14 March 1942 before proceeding to Yokosuka. Arriving there on 25 March 1942, she began an overhaul and repairs.

==== Midway operation ====
With the overhaul complete, I-123 departed Yokosuka bound for Kwajalein on 7 May 1942, deploying to participate in Operation MI, the planned Japanese invasion of Midway Atoll. She stopped at Kwajalein from 17 to 19 May 1942, then got back underway to support a preliminary phase of the Midway operation, Operation K-2, which called for I-121 and I-123 to refuel two Kawanishi H8K (Allied reporting name "Emily") flying boats at the French Frigate Shoals in the Northwest Hawaiian Islands so that the two aircraft could conduct a reconnaissance flight over Pearl Harbor, while I-122 patrolled south of Pearl Harbor to rescue the crews of the aircraft if they were shot down and the submarine I-171 operated east of the French Frigate Shoals to provide a radio beacon for the planes. The aircraft were scheduled to arrive at the French Frigate Shoals on 30 May 1942 and make their Pearl Harbor flight on 31 May. When I-123 arrived off the French Frigate Shoals on 29 May 1942, however, she found the U.S. Navy seaplane tenders USS Ballard (AVD-10) and USS Thornton (AVD-11) already operating flying boats there. She radioed her news of this sighting after she surfaced that night, and the reconnaissance flight was postponed for a day. When I-123 again observed the French Frigate Shoals on 31 May, she found the American ships still there and noted U.S. Navy flying boats landing in the lagoon, and this news resulted in the Japanese concluding that the U.S. Navy was using the atoll as a base. The Japanese decided to cancel the reconnaissance flights entirely.

With their supporting mission for the aircraft cancelled, I-121, I-122, and I-123 took patrol stations on 4 June 1942 in support of the scheduled invasion of Midway. The Battle of Midway began that day, and it ended on 7 June 1942 in a decisive Japanese defeat. The Japanese cancelled the invasion of Midway. I-123 concluded her patrol with her arrival at Kwajalein in company with I-121 and I-122 on 25 June 1942.

==== June–July 1942 ====
I-123 paused only briefly at Kwajalein, getting back underway the same day bound for Yokosuka, which she reached on 5 July 1942. During I-123′s stay at Yokosuka, Submarine Division 13 was resubordinated to Submarine Squadron 7 in the 8th Fleet on 14 July 1942. On 26 July 1942, she departed Yokosuka and proceeded to Truk to take up her new duties. Sources disagree on her subsequent movements: She either stopped at Truk briefly on 1 August 1942 and then proceeded to Rabaul, arriving there on 5 August 1942, or reached Truk on 2 August 1942 and remained there until beginning her next war patrol.

==== Fifth war patrol ====
The Guadalcanal campaign began on 7 August 1942 with United States Marine Corps landings on Guadalcanal, Tulagi, Florida Island, Gavutu, and Tanambogo in the southeastern Solomon Islands. That day, I-123 departed either Rabaul or Truk to begin her fifth war patrol, with orders to operate off Indispensable Strait in the Solomon Islands. After she put to sea, however, she received orders diverting her to conduct a reconnaissance of Lungga Roads off the northern coast of Guadalcanal. On 11 August 1942, she arrived off Lungga Point on Guadalcanal's northern coast. She surfaced after 11:00 on 12 August 1942 700 yards (640 m) off Lungga Point and bombarded U.S. Marine Corps positions on Guadalcanal, firing 14 rounds from her deck gun. The Marines returned fire, but I-123 submerged with no damage. Later that day, she received orders to contact Imperial Japanese Army troops at Taivu Point, further east along Guadalcanal's north coast. She attempted to contact them on 16 August 1942, but did not find the troops.

On 24 August 1942, as the two-day Battle of the Eastern Solomons began, I-123 received orders to contact an Imperial Japanese Army coastwatcher unit on the coast of Florida Island. After she failed to find the coastwatchers, she received new orders to patrol east of Savo Island.

==== Loss ====
In her new patrol area, I-123 was forced to submerge by an Allied seaplane at 01:25 on 29 August 1942. She reported the encounter in a message she transmitted at 03:12. The Japanese never heard from her again.

At 08:05 the destroyer minelayer USS Gamble (DM-15), steaming to Guadalcanal as a part of U.S. Navy Task Unit 62.2.4, sighted the conning tower of I-123 as she submerged 60 nautical miles (110 km; 69 mi) east of Savo Island. Using a magnetic anomaly detector to track I-123, Gamble conducted several depth charge attacks against her between 08:44 and 11:47. After the last attack, Gamble passed through a large oil slick and her crew observed a large air bubble breaking the surface. Gamble later recovered broken deck planking from the water. It marked the end of I-123, sunk at 09°21′S 160°43′E.

The Japanese submarine Ro-34, patrolling to the west of I-123, reported hearing a number of explosions coming from I-123′s location at the time of Gamble′s attack. On 1 September 1942, the Imperial Japanese Navy officially declared I-123 to be presumed lost with all 71 hands off Guadalcanal. She was stricken from the Navy list on 5 October 1942.

== Bibliography ==
- Boyd, Carl, and Akihiko Yoshida. The Japanese Submarine Force and World War II. Annapolis, Maryland: Naval Institute Press, 1995. ISBN 1-55750-015-0.
