= Lungga Plantation =

- Suburb
- Location in Guadalcanal
- Coordinates: 9°26′S 159°57′E
- Country: Solomon Islands
- Province: Honiara Town
- Island: Guadalcanal
- Elevation: 29 m (95 ft)
- Time zone: UTC+11 (UTC)

Lungga Plantation is a suburb of Honiara, Solomon Islands and is located East of Lungga Point.
