= Lungga Power Station =

Power plant in Lungga, Guadalcanal, Solomon Islands

- Country: Solomon Islands
- Location: Lungga, Guadalcanal
- Coordinates: 9°26′05.8″S 160°01′38.2″E
- Status: Operational
- Commission date: 2016 (new building)

Thermal power station
- Primary fuel: Diesel fuel

Power generation
- Nameplate capacity: 27 MW

The Lungga Power Station is a fossil fuel power station in Guadalcanal Province, Solomon Islands.

== History ==
The old power station has a capacity of 17 MW. The tender for the construction of the new expansion of the power station was awarded in 2014. The power station was handed over to the Solomon Islands Electricity Authority on 1 June 2016.

== Technical specifications ==
The old power station had a generation capacity of 17 MW. The new power station consists of four 2.5 MW generators, which are run on diesel fuel.
