= I24 =

I24 may refer to:

- HMCS Hamilton (I24)
- Interstate 24
- Japanese submarine I-24, several submarines
- i24NEWS (Israeli TV channel), an international news channel
