= I-121-class submarine =

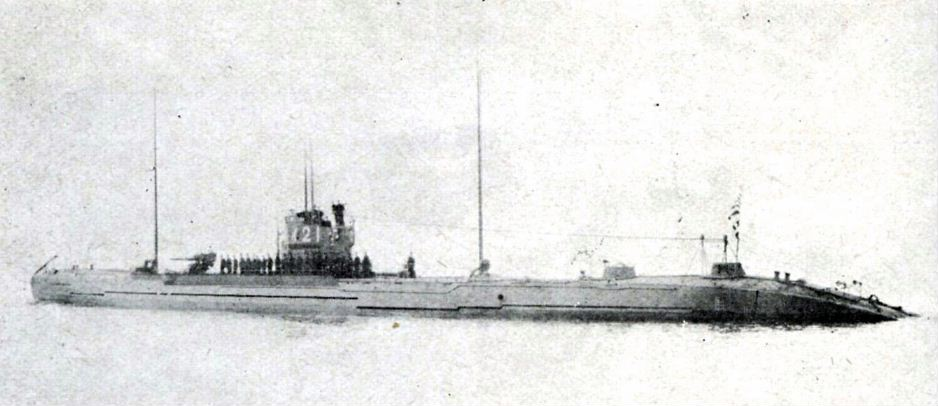
- I-121 (as I-21) in 1930.

Class overview
- Name: I-121 class submarine
- Builders: Kawasaki Corporation
- Operators: Imperial Japanese Navy
- Built: 1924–1928
- In commission: 1927–1945
- Planned: 6
- Completed: 4
- Canceled: 2
- Lost: 3
- Retired: 1

General characteristics
- Type: Minelaying submarine
- Displacement: 1,142 long tons (1,160 t) surfaced; 1,768 long tons (1,796 t) submerged
- Length: 85.20 m (279 ft 6 in) overall
- Beam: 7.52 m (24 ft 8 in)
- Draft: 4.42 m (14 ft 6 in)
- Propulsion: 2 × Rauschenbach Mk.1 diesels; 2,400 bhp surfaced; 1,100 shp submerged; 2 shafts
- Speed: 14.9 knots (27.6 km/h) surfaced; 6.5 knots (12.0 km/h) submerged
- Range: 10,500 nmi (19,400 km) at 8 knots (15 km/h) surfaced; 40 nmi (74 km) at 4.5 knots (8.3 km/h) submerged
- Test depth: 75 m (246 ft)
- Complement: 51
- Armament: 2 × 533 mm (21 in) torpedo tubes; 12 × 6th Year Type torpedoes; 1 × 14 cm/40 11th Year Type naval gun; 42 × naval mines

The I-121-class submarine (伊百二十一型潜水艦, I-hyaku-ni-jū-ichi-gata sensuikan) was a class of minelayer submarine in the Imperial Japanese Navy (IJN), serving from the 1920s to World War II. The IJN classed it as a Kiraisen type submarine (機雷潜型潜水艦, Kiraisen-gata sensuikan). The type name, was shortened from Kirai Fusetsu Sensuikan (機雷敷設潜水艦, Minelaying submarine).

== Design and construction ==
The four I-121-class submarines — I-21, I-22, I-23, and I-24, renumbered I-121, I-122, I-123, and I-124, respectively, on 1 June 1938 — were the Imperial Japanese Navy's only submarine minelayers. Their design was based on that of the Imperial German Navy minelaying submarine SM U-125, a Type UE II submarine which was the largest of seven German submarines transferred to Japan as a war reparation after World War I and served in the Imperial Japanese Navy as O-6 from 1920 to 1921. Like UB-125, the Kiraisen-type submarines had two diesel engines producing a combined 2,400 horsepower (1,790 kW), could carry 42 mines, and had four torpedo tubes and a single deck gun — a 5.5-inch (140 mm) gun on the Japanese submarines in contrast to a 5.9-inch (150 mm) gun on UB-125. Compared to the German submarine, they were larger — 10 feet (3 m) longer, and displacing 220 more tons on the surface and 300 more tons submerged — and had a longer range both on the surface — 970 nautical miles (1,800 km; 1,120 mi) farther at 8 knots (15 km/h; 9.2 mph) — and submerged — 5 nautical miles (9.3 km; 5.8 mi) farther at 4.5 knots (8.3 km/h; 5.2 mph). They were 0.2 knots (0.37 km/h; 0.23 mph) slower than UB-125 both surfaced and submerged, carried two fewer torpedoes, and had could dive to only 200 feet (61 m) compared to 250 feet (76 m) for UB-125.

The Imperial Japanese Navy ordered six I-121-class submarines, of which four were completed and two were cancelled. The Kawasaki Yard at Kobe, Japan, built all four of the submarines. In mid-1940, all four submarines underwent conversion into submarine tankers. Retaining their minelaying and torpedo capabilities, they were modified so that each of them could carry 15 tons of aviation gasoline with which to refuel flying boats, allowing the flying boats to extend their range during reconnaissance and bombing missions by meeting the submarines in harbors and lagoons for more fuel.

== Service ==
All four submarines saw front-line service during the Second Sino-Japanese War, during which they operated in northern Chinese waters, and the first half of the war in the Pacific during World War II. In the latter conflict, they laid mines and conducted anti-shipping patrols in East Asia and off Australia in the war′s opening weeks, during which I-124 was sunk. The other three submarines supported Japanese operations during the Battle of Midway and the Guadalcanal campaign, in which I-123 was lost. After service on supply runs during the New Guinea campaign, the two survivors, by then considered obsolescent, were withdrawn from combat in September 1943 and relegated to training duties in home waters, during which I-122 was sunk in the last weeks of the war. I-121 surrendered at the end of the war and was scuttled the following year.

== Boats in class ==
Name	Laid down	Launched	Completed	Successes	Fate
I-121 (ex-I-21) (ex-Submarine No. 48)	20 October 1924 as Submarine No. 48	30 March 1926 as I-21	31 March 1927	Often credited with sinking Dutch merchant ship Bantam on 18 January 1942, but Bantam was not in the area and survived World War II	Renamed I-21 on 1 November 1924; renamed I-121 on 1 June 1938. Decommissioned on 30 November 1945. scuttled off Maizuru, Japan, on 30 April 1946 by the United States Navy.
I-122 (ex-I-22) (ex-Submarine No. 49)	28 February 1925 as I-22	8 November 1926	28 October 1927	—	Renamed I-122 on 1 June 1938. Sunk by USS Skate off Noto Peninsula 37°29′N 137°25′E on 9 June 1945.
I-123 (ex-I-23) (ex-Submarine No. 50)	12 June 1925 as I-23	19 March 1927	28 April 1928	—	Renamed I-123 on 1 June 1938. Sunk by USS Gamble at Indispensable Strait on 29 August 1942.
I-124 (ex-I-24) (ex-Submarine No. 52)	17 April 1926 as I-24	12 December 1927	10 December 1928	Sank RMS Hareldawins on 10 December 1941	Renamed I-124 on 1 June 1938. Sunk by HMAS Deloraine, HMAS Katoomba and HMAS Lithgow at Port Darwin 12°05′N 130°06′E on 20 January 1942.
Submarine No. 53?	—	—	—	—	Cancelled in 1924.
Submarine No. 63?	—	—	—	—	Cancelled in 1924.
