= Japanese submarine I-22 (1938) =

Type C cruiser submarine

History

Empire of Japan
- Name: Submarine No. 47
- Builder: Kawasaki Shipbuilding, Kobe, Japan
- Laid down: 25 November 1937
- Renamed: I-22 in 1938
- Launched: 23 December 1938
- Completed: 10 March 1941
- Commissioned: 10 March 1941
- Fate: Sunk 6 October 1942
- Stricken: 15 December 1942

General characteristics
- Class & type: Type C submarine
- Displacement: 2,595 tonnes (2,554 long tons) surfaced; 3,618 tonnes (3,561 long tons) submerged
- Length: 109.3 m (358 ft 7 in) overall
- Beam: 9.1 m (29 ft 10 in)
- Draft: 5.3 m (17 ft 5 in)
- Installed power: 12,400 bhp (9,200 kW) (diesel); 2,000 hp (1,500 kW) (electric motor)
- Propulsion: Diesel-electric; 2 × diesel engines; 2 × electric motors
- Speed: 23.5 knots (43.5 km/h; 27.0 mph) surfaced; 8 knots (15 km/h; 9.2 mph) submerged
- Range: 14,000 nmi (26,000 km; 16,000 mi) at 16 knots (30 km/h; 18 mph) surfaced; 60 nmi (110 km; 69 mi) at 3 knots (5.6 km/h; 3.5 mph) submerged
- Test depth: 100 m (330 ft)
- Crew: 95
- Armament: 8 × bow 533 mm (21 in) torpedo tubes; 1 × 14 cm (5.5 in) deck gun; 2 × single or twin 25 mm (1 in) Type 96 anti-aircraft guns
- Notes: Fitted to carry 1 × Type A midget submarine

I-22 (伊22) was the fourth Type C cruiser submarines built for the Imperial Japanese Navy. During World War II, she operated as the mother ship for a midget submarine during the attack on Pearl Harbor and the attack on Sydney Harbour, supported Japanese forces during the Battle of the Coral Sea, and served in the Guadalcanal campaign. She was sunk in October 1942.

== Design and description ==
The Type C submarines were derived from the earlier Kaidai-type VI with a heavier torpedo armament for long-range attacks. They displaced 2,595 tonnes (2,554 long tons) surfaced and 3,618 tonnes (3,561 long tons) submerged. The submarines were 109.3 meters (358 ft 7 in) long, had a beam of 9.1 meters (29 ft 10 in) and a draft of 5.3 meters (17 ft 5 in). They had a diving depth of 100 meters (330 ft).

For surface running, the boats were powered by two 6,200-brake-horsepower (4,623 kW) diesel engines, each driving one propeller shaft. When submerged each propeller was driven by a 1,000-horsepower (746 kW) electric motor. They could reach 23.6 knots (43.7 km/h; 27.2 mph) on the surface and 8 knots (15 km/h; 9.2 mph) underwater. On the surface, the C1s had a range of 14,000 nautical miles (26,000 km; 16,000 mi) at 16 knots (30 km/h; 18 mph); submerged, they had a range of 60 nmi (110 km; 69 mi) at 3 knots (5.6 km/h; 3.5 mph).

The boats were armed with eight internal bow 53.3 cm (21.0 in) torpedo tubes and carried a total of 20 torpedoes. They were also armed with a single 140 mm (5.5 in)/40 deck gun and two single or twin mounts for 25 mm (1 in) Type 96 anti-aircraft guns. They were equipped to carry one Type A midget submarine aft of the conning tower.

== Construction and commissioning ==
Ordered under the 3rd Naval Armaments Supplement Programme and built by Kawasaki at Kobe, Japan, I-22 was laid down on 25 November 1937 with the name Submarine No. 47. While she was on the building ways, she was renamed I-22, the second submarine of that number, the first I-22 being renumbered I-122 on 1 June 1938 to make the number I-22 available for her. She was launched on 23 December 1938 and was completed and commissioned on 10 March 1941.

== Service history ==
=== Pre-World War II ===
Upon commissioning, I-22 was attached to the Yokosuka Naval District and assigned to the Yokosuka Guard Unit Training Squadron. She was reassigned to Submarine Division 3 in Submarine Squadron 1 in the 6th Fleet on 15 July 1941.

On 22 October 1941, I-22 moved from Saeki to the Kure Naval Arsenal in Kure. At Kure, she became the first submarine to undergo conversion into a mother ship for a Type A midget submarine. The submarines I-16, I-18, I-20, and I-24 also underwent the conversion. On 30 October 1941, I-22 replaced the submarine I-21 as flagship of Submarine Division 3.

At the Kure Navy Club in Kure on 17 November 1941, the commander of Submarine Division 3 briefed the commanding officers of the five converted submarines on the upcoming attack on Pearl Harbor and on the role of their submarines in it. He had been designated the commander of the Special Attack Unit, made up of all five submarines, each of which was to launch a Type A midget submarine off Pearl Harbor so that the midget submarines could participate in the attack. I-22 was to serve as flagship of the Special Attack unit.

On 18 November 1941, the five submarines moved from Kure to the Kamegakubi Naval Proving Ground, where each embarked a Type A midget submarine. At 02:15 on 19 November 1941, the five submarines got underway from Kamegakubi bound for the Hawaiian Islands, taking a direct route that took them south of Midway Atoll. While at sea, they received the message "Climb Mount Niitaka 1208" (Japanese: Niitakayama nobore 1208) from the Combined Fleet on 2 December 1941, indicating that war with the Allies would commence on 8 December 1941 Japan time, which was on 7 December 1941 on the other side of the International Date Line in Hawaii.

=== World War II ===
==== Pearl Harbor ====
At 01:10 on 7 December 1941, I-22 reached the launch position for her midget submarine, No. 15, 9 nautical miles (17 km; 10 mi) south of the entrance to Pearl Harbor. She launched No. 15 at 01:16. She sighted the silhouettes of two ships resembling heavy cruisers at 02:00 and submerged. She heard a heavy explosion at 07:12, followed by a second at 07:13 and a third at 08:18.

No. 15 apparently succeeded in penetrating the defenses of Pearl Harbor. At 08:30, while the air attack on the harbor was underway, the destroyer minesweeper USS Zane (DMS-14) reported sighting a midget submarine — likely No. 15 — 200 yards (180 m) astern of the repair ship USS Medusa (AR-1). The destroyer minelayer USS Breese (DM-18) next sighted the submarine, followed by the seaplane tender USS Curtiss (AV-4), which opened fire on it, as did Medusa and the seaplane tender USS Tangier (AV-8). The submarine fired a torpedo at Curtiss, then broached. Before it could submerge again, .50-caliber machine-gun fire raked it and a 5-inch (127 mm) shell hit its conning tower, decapitating its commanding officer. Meanwhile, the destroyer USS Monaghan (DD-354) had sighted the submarine 1,200 yards (1,100 m) off her starboard bow and steered toward it, intending to ram it. The submarine turned toward Monaghan and fired its second and last torpedo, which missed close aboard off Monaghan′s starboard side and exploded on the shore of Ford Island. Monaghan rammed the submarine, driving it to the bottom of the 30-foot (9.1 m) deep harbor, and dropped two depth charges which blew the submarine back to the surface. It then sank northwest of Ford Island with the loss of both members of its crew.

At sea, I-22 underwent repeated depth-charge attacks between 09:50 and 12:43, but suffered no damage. She surfaced at 18:06 and made for an area west of Lanai where plans called for the recovery of the midget submarines. She reached the area at 23:14. When none of the midget submarines arrived, she left at 06:00 on 8 December for an alternative recovery area, where she began a search on the surface for the midget submarines at 18:00, again finding none. The commander of the Special Attack Unit ordered her back to the primary recovery area off Lanai again on 9 December, but there still was no trace of the midget submarines or their crews. At 01:22 on 10 December, she received orders claiming that one of the midget submarines had achieved an unspecified "important victory" during the 7 December attack and instructing both I-22 and I-16 to continue to search for the midget submarines and their crews until dawn on 11 December. I-22 attempted to contact No. 15 by radio on 10 December, and at 18:02 began a search on the surface south of Molokai. Ultimately, none of the five midget submarines returned, and at dawn on 11 December, I-22 was off Lanai when she received orders to suspend the search and join I-18 in bombarding Johnston Island. She departed the Hawaiian Islands.

On 15 December 1941, I-22 approached Johnston Island in a rain squall. She opened fire with her 140-millimeter (5.5 in) deck gun from 5,500 yards (5,000 m) offshore. Her first two rounds bracketed the island. Her third shot set fire to an oil storage tank that fueled a nearby power station. She fired at the burning tank for ten minutes, hitting several other buildings. One 140-millimeter (5.5 in) shell landed astern of the U.S. Navy transport USS William Ward Burrows (AP-6), which was anchored inside the reef. Another shell passed over William Ward Burrows′s forecastle, but the ship suffered no hits. The United States Marine Corps forces on the island returned fire with 5-inch (127 mm) guns, but the Marine gunfire was inaccurate, and I-22 remained on the surface as she departed the area unscathed at 18 knots (33 km/h; 21 mph). She arrived at Kwajalein on 21 December 1941.

==== First war patrol ====
On 4 January 1942, I-22 departed Kwajalein in company with I-18 and I-24 on their first war patrols, assigned patrol areas off the Hawaiian Islands. She reached her assigned patrol area southeast of Oahu on 10 January and operated there uneventfully until either 18 or 20 January 1942, when she set course for the Northwestern Hawaiian Islands to reconnoiter the French Frigate Shoals to determine whether U.S. forces were present there. She conducted a brief reconnaissance of the French Frigate Shoals on 24 January 1942, then proceeded to Yokosuka, which she reached on 2 February 1942 in company with I-24.

==== February–April 1942 ====
I-22 moved to Kure later in February 1942, and on 10 March 1942 she was reassigned to Submarine Squadron 8. By 15 April 1942, she was assigned to Submarine Division 3 with I-21 and I-24, which together with Submarine Division 14 — consisting of I-27, I-28, and I-29 — made up the Eastern Advanced Detachment, which was under the overall command of Submarine Division 3′s commander.

On 15 April 1942, I-22 got underway from Kure bound for Truk along with the other submarines of the detachment. During their voyage, 16 United States Army Air Forces B-25 Mitchell bombers launched by the aircraft carrier USS Hornet (CV-8) struck targets on Honshu in the Doolittle Raid on 18 April 1942. The detachment received orders that day to divert from its voyage and head east-northeast at flank speed to intercept the U.S. Navy task force that had launched the strike, but the orders were canceled on 19 April and the submarines resumed their voyage to Truk, which they reached on 24 April 1942.

==== Second war patrol ====
On 30 April 1942, I-22, I-24, I-28, and I-29 got underway from Truk to form a patrol line southwest of Guadalcanal in support of Operation MO, a planned Japanese invasion of Tulagi in the Solomon Islands and Port Moresby on New Guinea. While they were en route, the Battle of the Coral Sea began on 4 May 1942 as Allied forces moved to block the Japanese offensive. As the battle continued, the four submarines arrived in their assigned areas and formed their patrol line on 5 May 1942. While the Japanese seized Tulagi and were turned back from Port Moresby, I-22′s patrol passed quietly. She received orders on 11 May 1942 to return to Truk. While she was en route, the submarine USS Tautog (SS-199) sighted two Japanese submarines — probably I-22 and I-24 — proceeding separately on the surface and unsuccessfully attacked one of them early on the morning of 17 May 1942, but a few hours later sank I-28, which was trailing I-22 and I-24 on the same course. I-22 arrived safely at Truk later that day.

==== Attack on Sydney Harbour and fourth war patrol ====
On the day she arrived at Truk, I-22 embarked a Type A midget submarine. She got underway in company with I-24 and I-27 on 18 May 1942 bound for Sydney, Australia, to launch a midget submarine attack against ships in Sydney Harbour. During their voyage, the three submarines received reconnaissance reports from I-29, which launched a floatplane to reconnoiter Sydney Harbour on 23 May 1942, and I-21, whose Yokosuka E14Y1 (Allied reporting name "Glen") floatplane conducted a reconnaissance flight early on the morning of 29 May 1942 and sighted the heavy cruiser USS Chicago (CA-29) at Sydney, mistakenly reporting her as a battleship. That day, the commander of the Eastern Advanced Detachment ordered the three submarines to launch the midget submarine attack.

On 30 May 1942, I-22, I-24, and I-27 arrived off Sydney. Between 17:21 and 17:40 on 31 May, each launched her midget submarine to begin what became known as the attack on Sydney Harbour. I-22′s midget, M21, reached the harbor, where the patrol boat HMAS Yandra tried to ram her, then dropped depth charges. M21 survived Yandra′s attack, but when the patrol vessel HMAS Sea Mist attacked her off Taylors Bay and disabled her, M21′s two-man crew shot themselves to death. Allied forces later found M21 on the harbor bottom with her motor still running. I-24′s and I-27′s midget submarines also were lost.

I-22, I-24, and I-27 loitered off Sydney until 3 June 1942 in the hope of recovering their midget submarines, then gave up hope and departed the area, splitting up to begin anti-shipping patrols. I-22 was tasked to conduct a reconnaissance of Wellington and Auckland, New Zealand, and Suva in the Fiji Islands. She carried out a periscope reconnaissance of Wellington on 8 and 9 June 1942, and on 9 June a New Zealand military post sighted her on the surface in Mahinepua Bay off the Cavalli Islands, reporting her 337 degrees northeast and 2.2 nautical miles (4.1 km; 2.5 mi) from the islands at 10:30 and 302 degrees northeast and 4.5 nautical miles (8.3 km; 5.2 mi) from them at 11:00. She attacked a small steamer off Portland Island at 14:18 on 10 June, but her torpedo passed under the steamer′s hull without exploding and the ship escaped. She reconnoitered Hauraki Gulf and Auckland after dark that evening, Suva on 17 and 18 June, and Auckland again on 19 June. and arrived at Kwajalein with I-21, I-24, I-27, and I-29 on 25 June 1942. She left Kwajalein on 5 July bound for Yokosuka, which she reached on 11 July 1942.

==== Fourth war patrol ====
During I-22′s stay at Yokosuka, the Guadalcanal campaign began on 7 August 1942 with U.S. amphibious landings on Guadalcanal, Tulagi, Florida Island, Gavutu, and Tanambogo in the southeastern Solomon Islands. On 11 September 1942, I-22 departed Yokosuka bound for the Solomon Islands to conduct her fifth war patrol, and while at sea received orders on 15 September 1942 to join a patrol line southwest of Rennell Island. She reported sighting a northbound Allied convoy 40 nautical miles (74 km; 46 mi) southeast of Malaita on 1 October and reported her position southeast of Malaita on 4 October 1942. She was never heard from again.

==== Loss ====
At 21:50 Greenwich Mean Time on 6 October 1942, a U.S. Navy PBY-5A Catalina flying boat flying southwest from Henderson Field on Guadalcanal sighted I-22 submerging in the Coral Sea at 11°22′S 162°20′E. The plane dropped four depth charges. Oil and bubbles appeared on the surface, marking the end of I-22 with the loss of all 100 men on board.

On 12 November 1942, the Imperial Japanese Navy declared I-22 to be presumed lost with all hands. She was stricken from the Navy list on 15 December 1942.

After World War II, the U.S. Joint Army-Navy Assessment Committee officially credited the U.S. Navy PT boat PT-122 with sinking I-22 off the Kumusi River on the coast of New Guinea during the night of 23–24 December 1942. This subsequently was disproved.
