= Tom Lewis (author) =

Australian author and historian

Thomas Anthony Lewis OAM
- Born: 1958 (age 67–68)
- Occupations: Popular Military Historian and Author

Thomas Anthony Lewis, OAM (born 1958) is an Australian author, popular military historian, public speaker, and former naval officer. An author since 1989, Lewis worked as a high school teacher, and served in the Australian armed forces for 20 years, seeing active service in Baghdad during the Iraq war, and working in East Timor. In June 2003, Lewis was awarded the Medal of the Order of Australia for meritorious service to the Royal Australian Navy, particularly in the promotion of Australian naval history.

== Career ==
After reconstituting the Royal Australian Naval College Historical Collection, with which his Order of Australia is largely connected, Lewis was the Director of the Darwin Military Museum from 2009 until April 2014, when he took up full-time research on several World War I and II projects. Amongst these were his role as Lead Historian and Creative Designer for The Borella Ride, the re-enactment of the journey of Albert Borella VC to sign up for military service in 1915.

Lewis was also Lead Historian for The Territory Remembers, a project of the Northern Territory Government to commemorate the 75th anniversary of the first attacks on Australia during the Second World War.

Lewis is the author or co-author of 26 books, all of which are popular works of military history except for one which charts the Tasman Bridge disaster – he was raised largely in Tasmania, although born in London. He was the editor of Headmark, the Journal of the Australian Naval Institute, from 2005 until 2016. He is the Australian correspondent for the UK magazine Warship World.

Tom's most recent works are The Secret Submarine (Big Sky, 2025), Australia's Coastal War (Big Sky, 2025), and The Battle of the Coral Sea - Explained (Avonmore, 2026). Big Sky have also just added his work Gallipoli - Dawn of the Anzac Spirit as No. 7 in their Australia Remembers children's series.

From 2013-2020 Lewis was the Chairman of the Order of Australia Association (NT). From 2015-2018 he was the Chairman of the Northern Territory Place Names Committee. From 2018 to 2021 he was an alderman of the City of Palmerston. Lewis has been a high school teacher in Queensland and the Northern Territory.

== Academic qualifications ==
Lewis holds the qualifications of Doctorate of Philosophy in Strategic Studies (Charles Darwin University 2004); Master of Arts in American Science Fiction and Cold War Politics (University of Queensland 1993); Diploma of Education (University of Tasmania 1984); and Bachelor of Arts in English (University of Tasmania 1983).

== Books ==
- Darwin Sayonara, Boolarong, 1991 – children's novel centred on the events of WWII in Darwin, Australia, 1942.
- Wrecks in Darwin Waters, Turton and Armstrong, 1991 – details the ship and aircraft wrecks, many from attacks in WWII and Cyclone Tracy in 1974, that may be found in waters near Darwin, Australia.
- Sensuikan I-124, Tall Stories, 1997 – dealing with the sinking of IJN submarine I-124 by HMAS Deloraine.
- A War at Home, Tall Stories, 1999 – about the Japanese attacks on Darwin on 19 February 1942.
- By Derwent Divided, Tall Stories, 2001 – tells the story of the Tasman Bridge disaster in the state of Tasmania, and the subsequent maritime events.
- Australian Naval Leaders. A study of nine naval officers of the Royal Australian Navy, with analysis of their careers and effectiveness. RAN College, 2006.
- 10 Shipwrecks of the Northern Territory. (Co-author, Edited by Paul Clark). Museums and Art Galleries of the Northern Territory, 2008.
- Captain Hec Waller – a Memorial Book. (Co-author, Edited by John Waller). Drawquick Printing, 2008.
- Zero Hour in Broome. Avonmore Books, South Australia, 2010. Analyses the second biggest air raid, in terms of fatalities, ever made on Australia.
- Darwin's Submarine I-124. Avonmore Books, South Australia, 2011. A study of the combat action of 20 January 1942 which sent this 80-man submarine to the seabed, where it remains intact outside Darwin today.
- The Submarine Six. Avonmore Books, South Australia, 2012. Biographies of the six men after whom the Collins-class submarines were named: Robert Rankin, John Collins, Emile Dechaineux, Hec Waller, Teddy Sheean, and Hal Farncomb.
- Lethality in Combat. Big Sky Publishing, Australia, 2012. A study of the reality of battlefield behaviour, across six wars. Examines battle enthusiasm, prisoner-taking, and actions against civilians as combatants, and shows the reality is far more grim than usually understood.
- Carrier Attack Darwin 1942: The Complete Guide to Australia's Own Pearl Harbor. Avonmore Books. 2013. ISBN 978-0-9871519-3-3., co-authored with Peter Ingman. A forensic study of the first air raid against Australia, which took place on 19 February 1942. With several appendices disproving many of the myths of the raid.
- Honour Denied – Teddy Sheean, A Tasmanian Hero. Avonmore Books, South Australia, 2016. A study of the last fight of HMAS Armidale, and the action taken by Teddy Sheean which many argue should have been rewarded with a Victoria Cross.
- The Empire Strikes South. (Avonmore, 2017); a study of Japanese air activity over Northern Australia in World War II. Includes appendices of all aircraft shot down and airmen killed in the war.
- Darwin Bombed. (Avonmore, 2020); A Young Person's Guide to the Japanese attacks of 19 February 1942.
- Atomic Salvation. (Big Sky/Casemate, 2020); How the A-Bomb Attacks Saved the Lives of 32 Million People.
- Eagles over Darwin. (Avonmore, 2021); The defence by the United States Army Air Forces of northern Australia in 1942.
- Teddy Sheean VC. (Big Sky, 2021); The story of Sheean; HMAS Armidale, and the battle for a Victoria Cross. (Winner of the 2021 national Australian Naval Institute Commodore Sam Bateman Book Prize)
- Medieval Military Combat. (Casemate, 2021); Battle Tactics and Fighting Techniques of the Wars of the Roses.
- Australia Remembers 4: The Bombing of Darwin 1942 (Big Sky, 2022)
- Attack on Sydney - the 1942 Submarine Raid - an 80 year Commemoration Perspective (Big Sky, 2022)
- Bombers North - RAAF, USAAF and Dutch operations from northern Australia in WWII (Avonmore, 2023)
- The Sinking of HMAS Sydney: Living, Fighting and Dying in WWII cruisers (Big Sky, 2023)

(Winner of the 2024 national Australian Naval Institute Commodore Sam Bateman Book Prize)

- Cyclone Warriors - the Armed Forces and Cyclone Tracy (Avonmore, 2024)
- The Secret Submarine (Big Sky, 2025)
- Australia's Coastal War (Big Sky, 2025)

(Shortlisted for the Anzac Memorial Trustees Military History Prize)

- The Battle of the Coral Sea Explained - how America saved Australia in 1942 (Avonmore, 2026)
- Australia Remembers 7 – Gallipoli, Dawn of the Anzac Spirit (Big Sky, 2026)

Forthcoming:

- How Military Aircraft Fought – likely 2028
- Grandad’s Vietnam War – likely 2027
