= Japanese submarine I-24 =

Japanese submarine I-24 may refer to one of the following submarines of the Imperial Japanese Navy:

- Japanese submarine I-124, a Kiraisen-type submarine launched in 1927 and known as I-24 until June 1938; sunk in January 1942
- Japanese submarine I-24 (1939), a Type C submarine launched in 1939 and sunk in June 1943
