= Japanese submarine I-122 =

Imperial Japanese Navy I-121-class submarine

- I-22 sometime prior to her renumbering as I-122 on 1 June 1938.

History

Imperial Japanese Navy
- Name: Submarine No. 49
- Builder: Kawasaki Corporation, Kobe, Japan
- Laid down: 28 February 1925
- Launched: 8 November 1926
- Renamed: I-22 on 8 November 1926
- Completed: 28 October 1928
- Commissioned: 28 October 1928
- Decommissioned: 16 March 1933
- Recommissioned: 15 November 1933
- Decommissioned: 15 February 1936
- Recommissioned: 30 June 1936
- Renamed: I-122 on 1 June 1938
- Decommissioned: 20 June 1938
- Recommissioned: 1 May 1940
- Fate: Sunk, 10 June 1945
- Stricken: 15 September 1945

General characteristics
- Class & type: I-121-class submarine
- Displacement: 1,142 long tons (1,160 t) surfaced; 1,768 long tons (1,796 t) submerged
- Length: 85.20 m (279 ft 6 in) overall
- Beam: 7.52 m (24 ft 8 in)
- Draft: 4.42 m (14 ft 6 in)
- Propulsion: 2 × Rauschenbach Mk.1 diesels; 2,400 bhp surfaced; 1,100 shp submerged; 2 shafts
- Speed: 14.9 knots (27.6 km/h; 17.1 mph) surfaced; 6.5 knots (12.0 km/h; 7.5 mph) submerged
- Range: 10,500 nmi (19,400 km; 12,100 mi) at 8 knots (15 km/h; 9.2 mph) surfaced; 40 nmi (74 km; 46 mi) at 4.5 knots (8.3 km/h; 5.2 mph) submerged
- Test depth: 75 m (246 ft) (as built); 55 m (180 ft) (from 1936)
- Complement: 80
- Armament: 2 × 533 mm (21 in) torpedo tubes; 12 × 6th Year Type torpedoes; 1 × 14 cm/40 11th Year Type naval gun; 42 × naval mines

I-122, laid down in 1925 as Submarine No. 49 and known as I-22 from her construction period until June 1938, was an I-121-class submarine of the Imperial Japanese Navy that served during the Second Sino-Japanese War and World War II. During the latter conflict, she conducted operations in support of the Japanese invasion of Malaya, the Japanese invasion of the Philippines, the bombing of Darwin, the Battle of Midway, the Guadalcanal campaign, the Battle of the Eastern Solomons, and the New Guinea campaign. From mid-1943 she served as a training ship in Japanese waters until she was sunk during a training voyage in 1945.

After she was renumbered I-122 in 1938, the number I-22 was assigned to a later submarine which also served during World War II.

== Design ==
I-122 and her three sister ships — I-21 (later renumbered I-121), I-23 (later renumbered I-123), and I-24 (later renumbered I-124) — were the Imperial Japanese Navy's only submarine minelayers. They were known in Japan by the type name Kirai Fusetsu Sensuikan (機雷敷設潜水艦, minelaying submarine), commonly shortened to "Kiraisen"-type submarine (機雷潜型潜水艦, Kiraisen-gata sensuikan).

The Kiraisen-type design was based on that of the Imperial German Navy minelaying submarine SM UB-125, a Type UB III submarine which was the largest of seven German submarines transferred to Japan as a war reparation after World War I and served in the Imperial Japanese Navy as O-6 from 1920 to 1921. Like UB-125, the Kiraisen-type submarines had two diesel engines producing a combined 2,400 horsepower (1,790 kW), could carry 42 mines, and had four torpedo tubes and a single deck gun — a 5.5-inch (140 mm) gun on the Japanese submarines in contrast to a 5.9-inch (150 mm) gun on UB-125. Compared to the German submarine, they were larger — 10 feet (3 m) longer, and displacing 220 more tons on the surface and 300 more tons submerged — and had a longer range both on the surface — 970 nautical miles (1,800 km; 1,120 mi) farther at 8 knots (15 km/h; 9.2 mph) — and submerged — 5 nautical miles (9.3 km; 5.8 mi) farther at 4.5 knots (8.3 km/h; 5.2 mph). They were 0.2 knots (0.37 km/h; 0.23 mph) slower than UB-125 both surfaced and submerged, carried two fewer torpedoes, and had could dive to only 200 feet (61 m) compared to 250 feet (76 m) for UB-125.

== Construction and commissioning ==
Built by Kawasaki at Kobe, Japan, I-122 was laid down on 28 February 1925 with the name Submarine No. 49, She was both launched and renumbered I-22 on 8 November 1926, and was completed and commissioned on 28 October 1928.

== Service history ==
=== 1928–1937 ===
Upon commissioning, I-22 was assigned to either the Kure Naval District or the Yokosuka Naval District, according to different sources. On 1 November 1927, she was assigned to Submarine Division 9 in the Yokosuka Defense Division in the Yokosuka Naval District. She was reassigned directly to the Kure Naval District on 1 December 1930, and then to Submarine Division 13 in the district on 15 October 1931. The division was assigned to the Kure Defense Division in the Kure Naval District on 1 October 1932. On 16 March 1933, I-22 was decommissioned and placed in reserve at Kure.

Submarine Division 13 was reassigned directly to the Kure Naval District on 15 November 1933, and that day I-22 was recommissioned and returned to active service in the division. The division began duty in the Kure Defense Squadron in the Kure Naval District on 15 November 1935, and I-22 was decommissioned and again placed in reserve, either on that day or on 16 February 1936, according to different sources.

I-22 again was recommissioned on 30 June 1936, rejoining Submarine Division 13 in the Kure Her sister ship I-24 had suffered damage to her main ballast tanks while I-23 and I-24 were conducting deep diving trials on 25 May 1935, so all four submarines of her class had their designed diving depth limited to 180 feet (55 m) in 1936.

=== Second Sino-Japanese War ===
On 7 July 1937 the first day of the Marco Polo Bridge Incident took place, beginning the Second Sino-Japanese War. In September 1937, Submarine Division 13, consisting of I-22 and her sister ship I-21, moved to a base at Qingdao, China, and began operations in northern Chinese waters as part of a Japanese blockade of China. On 1 December 1937, Submarine Division 13 was assigned to Submarine Squadron 3 in the 4th Fleet, a component of the Combined Fleet, and in December 1937, the light cruiser Kuma arrived at Qingdao to serve as flagship of Submarine Squadron 3, which consisted of I-21, I-22, I-23, and I-24.

I-21 and I-22 received orders to provide distant cover for Kuma while she put a Special Naval Landing Force (SNLF) unit ashore off Chefoo, China, on 3 February 1938, but both submarines experienced engine trouble that prevented them from getting underway to support Kuma. The two submarines had greater success on 22 March 1938, when they departed Port Arthur, Manchukuo, and each of them landed 15 Shanghai-based SNLF troops on Liukung Island in Weihai Bay before they returned to Port Arthur.

I-22 was renumbered I-122 on 1 June 1938, freeing up her previous number for the new submarine I-22, which was launched later that year. On 20 June 1938, I-122 was placed in the Second Reserve in the Kure Naval District. In an effort to reduce international tensions over the conflict in China, Japan withdrew its submarines from Chinese waters in December 1938.

=== 1939–1941 ===
While in reserve, I-122 and all three of her sister ships — which, like her, had been renumbered on 1 June 1938, I-21 becoming I-121, I-23 becoming I-123, and I-24 becoming I-124 — underwent conversion into submarine tankers. Retaining their minelaying and torpedo capabilities, they were modified so that each of them could carry 15 tons of aviation gasoline with which to refuel flying boats, allowing the flying boats to extend their range during reconnaissance and bombing missions by meeting the submarines in harbors and lagoons for more fuel.

On 1 May 1940, I-122 returned to active service in Submarine Division 13, which was assigned that day to Submarine Squadron 5 in the 4th Fleet. She soon began a lengthy training cruise in the Pacific in company with I-121, I-123, and I-124: The four submarines departed Sasebo, Japan, on 16 May 1940 and visited the waters of the Caroline Islands, Marshall Islands, and Mariana Islands before concluding their cruise with their arrival at Yokosuka, Japan, on 22 September 1940.

From 30 January to 4 February 1941, I-121 temporarily substituted for I-122 as flagship of Submarine Division 13 while I-122 was in reserve at Kure. On 1 May 1941, Submarine Division 13 was resubordinated to the 6th Fleet. By 15 October 1941, the division was a part of Submarine Squadron 3 in the 3rd Fleet.

As the Imperial Japanese Navy began to deploy in November 1941 in preparation for the impending conflict in the Pacific, I-122 arrived at Samah on Hainan Island in China in company with the submarine tender Chōgei on 27 November 1941. On 1 December 1941, I-122 departed Samah along with I-121 to begin what would become her first war patrol. She received the message "Climb Mount Niitaka 1208" (Japanese: Niitakayama nobore 1208) from the Combined Fleet on 2 December 1941, indicating that the Pacific campaign against the Allies would commence on 8 December 1941 Japan time (7 December 1941 on the other side of the International Date Line in Hawaii, where the war would begin with Japan's attack on Pearl Harbor). On 7 December 1941, the last day in East Asia before the attack, I-122 laid forty-two Type 88 Mark 1 mines northeast of Singapore, then took up her patrol station off the eastern entrance of Johore Strait along with I-121.

=== World War II ===
==== First war patrol ====
In East Asia, the Pacific campaign began on 8 December 1941, and Japanese forces invaded British Malaya to the north of Singapore that day. Reassigned to the Southern Submarine Force on 12 December 1941, I-122 called at Cam Ranh Bay in Japanese-occupied French Indochina on 14 December 1941. On 18 December 1941, she got back underway to support the Japanese invasion of the Philippines, bound for the vicinity of Davao on Mindanao in company with I-124. Reassigned to Submarine Group "A" along with I-121, I-123, and I-124 on 26 December 1941, she concluded her patrol on 31 December 1941 when she and I-124 arrival at newly captured Davao where Chōgei serviced I-121, I-122, and I-124.

==== Second war patrol ====
On 5 January 1942, I-122 set out from Davao to begin her second war patrol, bound for the waters off northern Australia. On 15 January 1942, she laid 30 mines in the western approaches to the Torres Strait. On 20 January 1942, she began patrolling in the northern approaches to the Dundas Strait between Melville Island and the Cobourg Peninsula in the Northern Territory on the mainland of Australia. She concluded her patrol by arriving at Davao with I-121 on 30 January 1942.

==== Third war patrol ====
In company with I-121, I-122 departed Davao on 9 February 1942 to begin her third war patrol, with a primary mission of supporting an impending air attack on Port Darwin by planes from the aircraft carriers of Vice Admiral Chuichi Nagumo′s Mobile Force and land-based aircraft from both Ambon and Kendari, Celebes. She parted company with I-121 on 13 February 1942; while I-121 headed south, I-122 proceeded southeast to patrol west of the Torres Strait, where she had orders to attack Allied shipping as well as serve as a picket to watch for Allied ship movements. On 19 February 1942 at 09:57, 188 aircraft from Nagumo's carriers began an attack on Darwin's harbor, airfields, and urban center, followed by a raid by 55 Japanese land-based bombers. The attack sank eight ships, damaged nine ships, destroyed 15 aircraft, and damaged structures in the city itself.

On 24 February 1942, I-122 sighted an Allied patrol vessel at 06:00, then departed her patrol station at 12:00. She proceeded to Staring Bay on the Southeast Peninsula of Celebes just southeast of Kendari, where she and I-121 concluded their patrols on 28 February 1942 with a rendezvous with Chōgei, which had moved there from Davao.

=== March–May 1942 ===
After replenishing and refueling, I-122 departed Staring Bay in company with I-121 on 10 March 1942 — the same day they were subordinated directly to the headquarters of the Combined Fleet — and headed for Japan. They arrived at Kure on 21 March 1942, and I-122 began a refit there. While they were there, Submarine Squadron 6 was disbanded on 10 April 1942, and their division — Submarine Division 13 — was subordinated directly to the 6th Fleet.

==== Midway operation ====
With her refit complete, I-122 departed Kure bound for Kwajalein on 13 May 1942, deploying to participate in Operation MI, the planned Japanese invasion of Midway Atoll. She reached Kwajalein on 23 May 1942. After a brief stay, she got back underway to support a preliminary phase of the Midway operation, Operation K-2, which called for I-121 and I-123 to refuel two Kawanishi H8K (Allied reporting name "Emily") flying boats at the French Frigate Shoals in the Northwest Hawaiian Islands so that the two aircraft could conduct a reconnaissance flight over Pearl Harbor. I-122 was to patrol south of Pearl Harbor to rescue the crews of the aircraft if they were shot down, and the submarine I-171 was to operate east of the French Frigate Shoals to provide a radio beacon for the planes. When I-123 arrived off the French Frigate Shoals in late May 1942, however, she found the U.S. Navy seaplane tenders USS Ballard and USS Thornton already operating flying boats there, and Operation K-2 was cancelled.

The Battle of Midway began on 4 June 1942, and on 5 June 1942 I-122 reached a new patrol area to support the other Japanese forces involved in it. The battle ended on 7 June 1942 in a decisive Japanese defeat, and the Japanese cancelled the invasion of Midway. I-122 concluded her patrol with her arrival at Kwajalein in company with I-121 and I-123 on 25 June 1942. She got back underway before the end of June to return to Japan, arriving at Yokosuka probably in July 1942.

==== Guadalcanal campaign ====
Toward the end of I-122′s stay at Yokosuka, Submarine Division 13 was resubordinated to Submarine Squadron 7 in the 8th Fleet on 14 July 1942. On 16 July 1942, she departed Yokosuka to take up her new duties, calling at Truk from 24 to 31 July 1942 and arriving at Rabaul on New Britain on 4 August 1942.

While I-122 was at Rabaul, the Guadalcanal campaign began on 7 August 1942 with U.S. amphibious landings on Guadalcanal, Tulagi, Florida Island, Gavutu, and Tanambogo in the southeastern Solomon Islands. I-122 and I-121 put to sea that day from Rabaul to conduct a reconnaissance in the waters off Guadalcanal and Tulagi. On 9 August 1942, she began a periscope reconnaissance of Lungga Point on the northern coast of Guadalcanal and of the Lungga Roads anchorage offshore. At 17:30 on 13 August 1942 she surfaced in daylight 1.6 nautical miles (3.0 km; 1.8 mi) southwest of Tulagi and displayed her battle flag in an attempt to encourage Imperial Japanese Army soldiers fighting on shore. While surfaced, she attempted a reconnaissance of Tulagi, but came under fire from the island and immediately submerged. On 15 August 1942, I-122 conducted a reconnaissance of Vanikoro in the Santa Cruz Islands. She continued to operate in the southeastern Solomon Islands until after the Battle of the Eastern Solomons on 24–25 August 1942. She returned to Rabaul on 7 September 1942.

An Aichi E13A (Allied reporting name "Jake") reconnaissance seaplane from the seaplane tender Chitose had delivered equipment for refueling floatplanes at sea to Rabaul, and I-122 embarked this equipment. On 9 September 1942 she departed Rabaul to refuel seaplanes in Indispensable Strait. She operated off the Indispensable Reefs from 14 to 20 September 1942 — claiming a U.S. aircraft shot down in Indispensable Strait on 15 September 1942 — then was recalled to Rabaul. Her engines developed a clutch problem en route, but she arrived at Rabaul on 25 September 1942. She underwent repairs tbere.

With her repairs complete, I-122 again put to sea from Rabaul on 21 October 1942 to refuel reconnaissance floatplanes at the Indispensable Reefs. She operated off the reefs from 26 to 27 October 1942, then moved to a patrol area west of Guadalcanal. At 06:15 on 6 November 1942 she sighted an Allied convoy of three transports escorted by a cruiser and five destroyers southwest of Malaita. She attempted an attack, but the convoy's escorts detected her and drove her off. She moved back to the Indispensable Reefs on 8 November 1942 and operated off them from 10 to 12 November 1942. She returned to Rabaul on 16 November 1942, but left the same day for Truk, where she stopped from 20 to 27 November. She then headed for Japan, where she arrived at Kure on 5 December 1942 to undergo an overhaul.

==== New Guinea campaign ====
With her overhaul complete, I-122 moved from Kure to Saeki. She departed Saeki on 14 March 1943 bound for Rabaul, where she arrived on 25 March 1943 and was assigned the mission of supporting Japanese forces fighting in the New Guinea campaign by delivering supplies to Lae on the coast of New Guinea. She began her first supply run on 27 March 1943, when she put to sea from Rabaul. She arrived at Lae on 30 March, unloaded her cargo, and got back underway the same day, arriving at Rabaul on either 31 March or 2 April 1943, according to different sources. Her second run began on 15 April 1943 — the same day that her squadron, Submarine Squadron 7, was reassigned to the Southeast Area Fleet — and she arrived on 18 April at Lae, where she unloaded either 23 or 23.5 (according to different sources) tons of food and ammunition, embarked 15 sick or wounded soldiers, and departed the same day, reaching Rabaul on 20 April 1943. On her next runs, she departed Rabaul on 24 April, called at Lae on 26 April, unloaded 23.5 tons of food and ammunition, and returned to Rabaul 28 April 1943; departed Rabaul on 2 May, called at Lae on 4 May, again unloading 23.5 tons of food and ammunition and taking aboard 15 soldiers, and returned to Rabaul on 8 May 1943; put to sea from Rabaul on 10 May, visited Lae on 12 May, and reached Rabaul on 14 May 1943; and left Rabaul on 23 May, unloaded supplies at Lae on 25 May, and returned to Rabaul on 27 May 1943. On 31 May 1943, Submarine Division 13 was disbanded, and I-122 and I-121 were attached directly to Submarine Squadron 7 headquarters.

I-122 continued making supply runs from Rabaul to Lae throughout June and into early July 1943. Departing Rabaul on 3 June, she called at Lae on 5 June, and departed the same day for Rabaul, which she reached on 7 June; left Rabaul on 10 June, unloaded at Lae on 12 June, and returned to Rabaul on 14 June; departed Rabaul on 21 June, visited Lae on 23 June, and made port at Rabaul on 25 June 1943; and got underway from Rabaul on 30 June, stopped at Lae on 2 July, and arrived at Rabaul on 4 July 1943. In her tenth and final run, she departed Rabaul on 7 July and visited Lae on 9 July before heading back to Rabaul, which she reached on 11 July 1943. On 15 August 1943, I-122 and I-121 were transferred to the Kure Guard Unit in the Kure Naval District in Japan. I-122 left Rabaul for the last time on 19 August 1943, bound for her new duties in Japan. She reached Kure on 1 September 1943 and underwent repairs there.

==== Home waters ====
After arriving in Japan, the aging I-122 and I-121, by then considered obsolescent, were withdrawn from combat and assigned duty as training ships at Kure Naval Base. On 1 December 1943, Submarine Division 18, consisting of I-122 and I-121, was reassigned to the Kure Submarine Squadron in the Kure Naval District along with the submarines I-153, I-154, and I-155, which also had been relegated to a training role. On 5 January 1944, I-122 took part in submarine camouflage pattern experiments conducted by the Naval Submarine School in the Seto Inland Sea to determine a particular camouflage pattern's horizontal visibility and visibility from aircraft, the effectiveness of its color against the sea background, and its ability to confuse an observer as to a submarine's speed and course, as well as to test the durability of the paint used.

On 31 January 1944, I-122 and I-121 were reassigned to Submarine Division 19 in the Kure Guard Squadron or Kure Submarine Squadron (according to different sources) in the Kure Naval District, in which they continued their training duties. By 1 January 1945, the submarines I-155, I-156, I-157, I-158, I-159, I-162 and I-165 also were in the division. On 20 April 1945, I-122 and I-121 were resubordinated to Submarine Division 33 in the Kure Submarine Squadron in the Kure Naval District. I-122 was drydocked at Maizuru, Japan, on 28 May 1945.

==== Loss ====
At 11:45 on 9 June 1945, I-122 got underway from Maizuru for a training cruise in Nanao Bay in the Sea of Japan, under the command of Lieutenant Mihara Sosaku. On 10 June 1945, as I-122 zigzagged on the surface in Nanao Bay at 15 knots (28 km/h; 17 mph) while returning to her base at Nanao, the American submarine USS Skate sighted her at 11:20. At 11:44, Skate fired four torpedoes at a range of 800 yards (730 m). Two of them hit I-122 amidships, and she sank quickly 6 nautical miles (11 km; 6.9 mi) southeast of Rokugo Misaki Lighthouse at 37°29′N 137°25′E. Five minutes later, Skate's crew heard the sounds of I-122 breaking up and saw a large air bubble reach the surface, followed by a great deal of oil.

Observers at the lighthouse witnessed the sinking of I-122, but the Japanese did not realize that American submarines had penetrated the defenses of the Sea of Japan and attributed her loss to the on-board explosion of her own torpedoes. After they reported the sinking, an Imperial Japanese Navy Aichi M6A1 Seiran ("Clear Sky Storm") floatplane arrived on the scene to search for survivors but found none; I-122 was lost with all hands. Skate sighted the floatplane, but it did not detect her.

I-122 was stricken from the Navy list on 15 September 1945.

== Wreck ==
On 7 October 2025, it was announced on social media that the wreck of I-122 had been located on 10 November 2023. The submarine rests at a depth of 394 feet off the coast of Suzu, Ishikawa prefecture.

== Bibliography ==
- Boyd, Carl, and Akihiko Yoshida. The Japanese Submarine Force and World War II. Annapolis, Maryland: Naval Institute Press, 1995. ISBN 1-55750-015-0.
