= Japanese submarine I-124 =

Imperial Japanese Navy I-121-class submarine

History
- Name: Submarine Minelayer No. 52 or Submarine No. 60 (see text)
- Builder: Kawasaki Corporation, Kobe, Japan
- Laid down: 17 April 1926
- Launched: 12 December 1927
- Renamed: I-24 on 12 December 1927
- Completed: 10 December 1928
- Decommissioned: 25 May 1935
- Recommissioned: 15 November 1935
- Renamed: I-124 on 1 June 1938
- Decommissioned: 20 March 1940
- Recommissioned: 24 April 1940
- Fate: Sunk 20 January 1942
- Stricken: 30 April 1942

General characteristics
- Class & type: I-121-class submarine
- Displacement: 1,142 long tons (1,160 t) surfaced; 1,768 long tons (1,796 t) submerged
- Length: 85.20 m (279 ft 6 in) overall
- Beam: 7.52 m (24 ft 8 in)
- Draft: 4.42 m (14 ft 6 in)
- Propulsion: 2 × Rauschenbach Mk.1 diesels; 2,400 bhp surfaced; 1,100 shp submerged; 2 shafts
- Speed: 14.9 knots (27.6 km/h; 17.1 mph) surfaced; 6.5 knots (12.0 km/h; 7.5 mph) submerged
- Range: 10,500 nmi (19,400 km; 12,100 mi) at 8 knots (15 km/h; 9.2 mph) surfaced; 40 nmi (74 km; 46 mi) at 4.5 knots (8.3 km/h; 5.2 mph) submerged
- Test depth: 75 m (246 ft) (as built); 55 m (180 ft) (from 1936)
- Complement: 80
- Armament: 2 × 533 mm (21 in) torpedo tubes; 12 × 6th Year Type torpedoes; 1 × 14 cm/40 11th Year Type naval gun; 42 × naval mines

I-124, originally named Submarine Minelayer No. 52 and then named I-24 from before her launch until June 1938, was an I-121-class submarine of the Imperial Japanese Navy that served during the Second Sino-Japanese War and World War II. During the latter conflict, she operated in support of the Japanese invasion of the Philippines and was sunk during anti-shipping operations off Australia in January 1942.

After she was renumbered I-124 in 1938, the number I-24 was assigned to a later submarine which also served during World War II.

== Design ==
I-124 and her three sister ships — I-21 (later renumbered I-121), I-22 (later renumbered I-122) and I-23 (later renumbered I-123) — were the Imperial Japanese Navy's only submarine minelayers. They were known in Japan by the type name Kirai Fusetsu Sensuikan (機雷敷設潜水艦, minelaying submarine), commonly shortened to "Kiraisen"-type submarine (機雷潜型潜水艦, Kiraisen-gata sensuikan).

The Kiraisen-type design was based on that of the Imperial German Navy minelaying submarine SM UB-125, a Type UB III submarine which was the largest of seven German submarines transferred to Japan as a war reparation after World War I and served in the Imperial Japanese Navy as O-6 from 1920 to 1921. Like UB-125, the Kiraisen-type submarines had two diesel engines producing a combined 2,400 horsepower (1,790 kW), could carry 42 mines and had four torpedo tubes and a single deck gun — a 5.5-inch (140 mm) gun on the Japanese submarines in contrast to a 5.9-inch (150 mm) gun on UB-125. Compared to the German submarine, they were larger — 10 feet (3 m) longer and displacing 220 more tons on the surface and 300 more tons submerged — and had a longer range both on the surface — 970 nautical miles (1,800 km; 1,120 mi) farther at 8 knots (15 km/h; 9.2 mph) — and submerged — 5 nautical miles (9.3 km; 5.8 mi) farther at 4.5 knots (8.3 km/h; 5.2 mph). They were 0.2 knots (0.37 km/h; 0.23 mph) slower than UB-125 both surfaced and submerged, carried two fewer torpedoes and could dive to only 200 feet (61 m) compared to 250 feet (76 m) for UB-125.

== Construction and commissioning ==
Built by Kawasaki at Kobe, Japan, I-124 was laid down on 17 April 1926 with either the name Submarine No. 60 or Submarine Minelayer No. 52, according to different sources. She was launched on 12 December 1927 and renamed I-24 that day. She was completed and commissioned on 10 December 1928.

== Service history ==
=== 1928–1937 ===
Upon commissioning, I-24 was attached to the Yokosuka Naval District and assigned to Submarine Division 9 in the Yokosuka Defense Division in the district. On 11 December 1933, Submarine Division 9 was reassigned to the Yokosuka Guard Unit or Yokosuka Guard Squadron in the Yokosuka Naval District.

While conducting deep diving trials with her sister ship I-23 on 25 May 1935, I-24 suffered damage to her main ballast tanks. She was placed in reserve that day to have her ballast tanks reinforced. On 15 November 1935, Submarine Division 9 was reassigned to the Yokosuka Defense Squadron in the Yokosuka Naval District, and, with her ballast tank work complete, I-24 returned to active service that day, but in 1936 all four submarines of her class had their designed diving depth limited to 180 feet (55 m).

=== Second Sino-Japanese War ===
On 7 July 1937 the first day of the Marco Polo Bridge Incident took place, beginning the Second Sino-Japanese War. In September 1937, Submarine Division 9, consisting of I-23 and I-24, moved to a base at Qingdao, China and began operations in northern Chinese waters as part of a Japanese blockade of China. On 1 December 1937, Submarine Division 13 was assigned to Submarine Squadron 3 in the 4th Fleet, a component of the Combined Fleet, and in December 1937, the light cruiser Kuma arrived at Qingdao to serve as flagship of Submarine Squadron 3, which consisted of Submarine Division 13 (made up of I-21 and I-22) as well as Submarine Division 9 (I-23 and I-24).

I-24 was renumbered I-124 on 1 June 1938, freeing up her previous number for the new submarine I-24, whose keel was laid that year. On 20 June 1938, Submarine Division 9 was assigned to the Gunnery School in the Yokosuka Naval District. In an effort to reduce international tensions over the conflict in China, Japan withdrew its submarines from Chinese waters in December 1938,

=== 1939–1941 ===
On 1 May 1939, Submarine Division 9 was placed in the Third Reserve in the Yokosuka Naval District, and it moved to the Second Reserve in the district on 15 November 1939. On 20 March 1940, I-124 herself was placed in reserve at Yokosuka. While in reserve, I-124 and all three of her sister ships — which, like her, had been renumbered on 1 June 1938, I-21 becoming I-121, I-22 becoming I-122 and I-23 becoming I-123 — underwent conversion into submarine tankers. Retaining their minelaying and torpedo capabilities, they were modified so that each of them could carry 15 tons of aviation gasoline with which to refuel flying boats, allowing the flying boats to extend their range during reconnaissance and bombing missions by meeting the submarines in harbors and lagoons for more fuel.

I-124 was recommissioned on 24 April 1940, and on 1 May 1940 Submarine Division 9 was assigned to Submarine Squadron 5 in the 4th Fleet. I-124 soon began a lengthy training cruise in the Pacific in company with I-121, I-122, and I-123: The four submarines departed Sasebo, Japan, on 16 May 1940 and visited the waters of the Caroline Islands, Marshall Islands, and Mariana Islands before concluding their cruise with their arrival at Yokosuka, Japan, on 22 September 1940. On 11 October 1940, I-124 was one of 98 Imperial Japanese Navy ships that gathered along with more than 500 aircraft on the Japanese coast at Yokohama Bay for an Imperial fleet review — the largest fleet review in Japanese history — in honor of the 2,600th anniversary of the enthronement of the Emperor Jimmu, Japan's legendary first emperor.

Submarine Division 9 was reassigned directly to the Yokosuka Naval District on 15 November 1940. On 1 May 1941, the division was assigned to Submarine Squadron 6 in the 3rd Fleet, a component of the Combined Fleet, and I-123 and I-124 were based at Kure. From 7 to 9 April 1941, I-123 temporarily substituted for I-124 as flagship of Submarine Division 9. I-123 again took over from I-124 as flagship of Submarine Division 9 on 2 August 1941.

As the Imperial Japanese Navy began to deploy in preparation for the impending conflict in the Pacific, I-123 and I-124, under the command of Lieutenant Commander Kishigami Koichi, moved from Yokosuka, Japan, to Samah on Hainan Island in China, where I-124 arrived on 27 November 1941 in company with the submarine tender Chōgei. She received the message "Climb Mount Niitaka 1208" (Japanese: Niitakayama nobore 1208) from the Combined Fleet on 2 December 1941, indicating that war with the Allies would commence on 8 December 1941 Japan time (7 December 1941 on the other side of the International Date Line in Hawaii, where the war would begin with Japan's attack on Pearl Harbor).

=== World War II ===
==== First war patrol ====
On 7 December 1941, I-124 laid 39 Type 88 Mark 1 mines off Manila Bay in the Philippines. I-124 then proceeded to an area southwest of Lubang Island to provide weather reports and to stand by to rescue Japanese aircrews downed in air strikes on Manila launched from Formosa after hostilities began.

On 8 December 1941, Pacific campaign of World War II began in East Asia. On 10 December 1941, I-124 torpedoed and sank the 1,523-gross register ton British cargo ship Hareldawns — which was on a voyage from Hong Kong to Singapore — 8 nautical miles (15 km; 9.2 mi) off western Luzon at 15°N 120°E and took her captain prisoner. She concluded her patrol with her arrival at Cam Ranh Bay in Japanese-occupied French Indochina on 14 December 1941.

The mines I-124 laid off Manila Bay sank the 1,881-gross register ton American merchant ship Corregidor on 17 December 1941 at 14°N 120°E and the 1,976-gross register ton Panamanian-flagged cargo ship Daylite on 10 January 1942, also at 14°N 120°E.

==== Second war patrol ====
I-124 got back underway from Cam Ranh Bay on 18 December 1941 to begin her second war patrol. By 22 December she was patrolling off the entrance to Manila Bay. She then proceeded via Mindoro Strait to the Sulu Sea. Reassigned with I-121, I-122 and I-123 to Submarine Group "A" on 26 December 1941, she concluded her uneventful patrol on 31 December 1941, arriving at newly captured Davao on Mindanao in company with I-122. The rest of Submarine Squadron 6 — I-121, I-123 and Chōgei — soon joined them there.

==== Third war patrol ====
Submarine Squadron 6 received orders to operate next in the Flores Sea and the Torres Strait north of Australia. On 10 January 1942, the four submarines departed Davao, commencing I-124's third war patrol. I-124 reached her patrol area off the western entrance of the Clarence Strait off Australia′s Northern Territory on 14 January 1942. That day, she sighted the United States Navy heavy cruiser USS Houston (CA-30) and destroyers USS Alden (DD-211) and USS Edsall (DD-219), which were returning to Australia from a sweep in the Banda Sea, but was unable to gain an attack position. On 16 January she laid 27 mines near Darwin, Australia. Four Japanese mines that washed ashore near Darwin on 11 February 1942 may have been laid by I-124.

On 18 January 1942, Houston reported sighting two Japanese submarines — probably I-123 and I-124 — 180 nautical miles (330 km; 210 mi) west of Darwin. At 17:40 on 19 January, I-124 reported the arrival at Darwin of three Allied transports escorted by a destroyer. She repeated the report at 22:36, which was the last time the Japanese ever heard from her. Allied codebreakers intercepted the signal and warned Allied forces that I-124 was off Darwin.

=== Loss ===
On 20 January 1942, I-124's sister ship I-123 conducted an unsuccessful torpedo attack in the Beagle Gulf 40 nautical miles (74 km; 46 mi) west of Darwin at 12°08′S 130°10′E against the U.S. Navy fleet oiler USS Trinity (AO-13), escorted by Alden and Edsall. Trinity sighted the wakes of three of I-123's torpedoes and reported the attack, after which Alden carried out a depth charge attack. Alden soon lost contact with I-123, which escaped unscathed and departed the area. Trinity, Alden and Edsall continued their voyage and reached Darwin safely.

When news of the attack reached Darwin, the Royal Australian Navy corvettes HMAS Deloraine, HMAS Lithgow and HMAS Katoomba put to sea to search for I-123. Deloraine reached the vicinity of the attack first. In the meantime, I-124 also had arrived in the area and she fired a torpedo at Deloraine at 13:35. Deloraine turned to starboard and the torpedo passed 10 feet (3 m) astern of her, broaching as it passed through her wake. Deloraine established asdic contact on I-124 at 13:38 and dropped six depth charges at 13:43. She sighted oil and air bubbles on the surface after the attack. After Deloraine dropped another pattern of depth charges, I-124 briefly broached at 12°07′S 130°09′E, exposing her bow and periscope, down 5 degrees by the stern and listing 20 degrees to port. Before I-124 fully submerged again, a depth charge from Deloraine′s port depth charge thrower landed 10 feet (3 m) from her periscope and a U.S. Navy OS2U Kingfisher floatplane from the seaplane tender USS Langley (AV-3) arrived on the scene and dropped a bomb at the same spot. When I-124 submerged, she settled on the seabed in 150 feet (46 m) of water. Deloraine again depth-charged the stationary submarine at 13:56, then noted more oil, bubbles and particles of TNT on the surface. At 14:30 she made another underwater contact to the southeast and conducted two more attacks there, expending the last of her depth charges and noting more oil and bubbles rising to the surface.

Lithgow relieved Deloraine on the scene by 17:10. By 18:39 Lithgow had made seven attacks, expending all 40 of her depth charges, and she observed diesel oil and bubbles on the surface. Katoomba arrived at 17:48 and deployed a grapnel to drag the bottom for I-124. The grapnel made contact, but broke off when Katoomba attempted to recover it. Alden and Edsall joined the Australian ships at 18:59. Edsall detected a contact at the edge of the oil slick and dropped five depth charges at 19:40, noting three explosions. Alden attacked a contact of her own after 19:55.

Deloraine, which had departed the area, returned at 03:05 on 21 January 1942 and made another submarine detection, which she attacked three times. The boom defence vessel HMAS Kookaburra joined her and began a series of attempts to locate I-124 on the ocean floor. Katoomba, which also had left the scene, returned around 11:55, but at midday, the weather in the area deteriorated and no further attacks took place. Delorainee claimed two submarines sunk and Katoomba claimed one. In reality, I-124, sunk with the loss of all 80 men on board, was the only submarine present and she was the first Japanese warship sunk by the Royal Australian Navy and fourth Japanese submarine lost in World War II.

On 26 January 1942, Kookaburra returned to the scene with a team of 16 U.S. Navy divers from the submarine tender USS Holland (AS-3). The fourth and fifth divers identified a large submarine on the sea bottom with one hatch apparently blown open. It was the first confirmation of the demise of I-124. The divers recorded the location of her wreck as 12°03′S 130°09′E.

The Japanese struck I-124 from the Navy List on 30 April 1942.

== Attempted salvage and protection as war grave ==
I-124 has been surrounded by controversy since her loss. During World War II there were claims that two submarines had been lost in the operations off Darwin; that her crew remained alive for some time; and that divers heard crew movement inside her hull. Later both Japanese and American sources reported that "the I 124 with her Division Commander Keiyu Endo, embarked, sank with all those on board in water only forty feet [12.2 meters] deep. US Navy divers were sent down and entered the submarine and removed naval codebooks, a godsend for the Navy codebreakers at Pearl Harbor". However, this was later disproved by maritime archaeologist Dr M. McCarthy in his unpublished departmental report. This was published with additional information, including details about the Japanese crew by naval historian Dr. Tom Lewis in his book Sensuikan I-124, later re-published as Darwin's Submarine I-124.

McCarthy and Lewis set out how the submarine was indeed the subject of diving attempts soon after the action, with the Royal Australian Navy and United States Navy both trying to access it to recover codebooks. However, the initial dives did not enter the wreck and diving later was curtailed because the Japanese air raid on Darwin on 19 February 1942 made it seem too dangerous to anchor ships over the site to support divers.

Though relatives of the crew attempted to organise the recovery of the crew's remains for cremation in accordance with Japanese custom, I-124 was then left undisturbed until 1972, when its location was rediscovered following a six-week search. Trade Winds Ltd. and Lincoln Ltd. Salvage Company (T&L Salvage) of the New Hebrides purchased the salvage rights for the submarine from the Australian government. The wreck was found to be mostly intact in 48 metres (157 ft) of water with several holes near the conning tower and at least one "blown" hatch. The salvage company believed the submarine was carrying large quantities of mercury when she sank and offered to sell the wreck and any remains of its personnel to the Japanese government for A$2.5 million. The Japanese consul-general in Australia advised T&L Salvage that any salvage required the approval of the Japanese government, which it was not willing to give as it considered the site to be war grave. The Australian government found that it legally held no control over the wrecked submarine. The matter was further complicated by infighting within the salvage company, which led to a split in April 1973 when one of the salvors threatened to drop explosives on the submarine if a Japanese decision was slow in forthcoming. The controversy gained much media attention. Both salvage groups attempted to claim the right to salvage I-124, but withdrew their claims by the end of 1974, one willingly, the other after pressure from the Australian government, which had come to join the Japanese in considering the shipwreck a war grave.

In December 1976, the matter of I-124 was raised in the Parliament of Australia during discussion of a bill that would protect all shipwrecks in Australian waters. The bill was enacted as the Historic Shipwrecks Act at the end of 1976. The salvor, Harry Baxter, carried through on a threat to use explosives on the wreck, damaging the conning tower and causing its aft section to come loose. In response, I-124 was placed under the enhanced level of protection offered by the legislation, with an exclusion zone placed around the wreck in July 1977. The salvage team reports indicated that the submarine still carried mines, which led to the Royal Australian Navy sending the minehunter HMAS Curlew to locate and defuse them. Divers from the minehunter found no mines or explosives at the wreck site.

A team from the Western Australian Museum led by Dr. M. "Mack" McCarthy aboard the research vessel Flamingo Bay carried out a subsequent investigation of the wreck in March 1989. The expedition found that the location of the submarine was incorrectly recorded on charts and corrected it to 12°07′12.328″S 130°06′23.619″E, a point 18 nautical miles (33 km; 21 mi) due south of Penguin Hill on Bathurst Island. The researchers also disproved rumours that a second submarine had been sunk off Darwin at the same time, that the U.S. Navy had salvaged Japanese codebooks from the wreck, and that mercury was aboard I-124 when she sank, which was the reason given in the 1970s for removing the wreck. Subsequent research by Tom Lewis further disproved these rumours, as well as claims that I-124 was involved in the sinking of the Australian light cruiser HMAS Sydney in November 1941.

In November 2022, the ABC reported that a team of divers had completed a three-year mission to create a 3D map of I-124.

== Memorial ==
In 2017, the Australian Japanese Association of the Northern Territory (AJANT) erected a memorial plaque for I-124 and her crew at the Dripstone Cliffs in Darwin, Australia. A dedication ceremony for the plaque took place at Parliament House in Darwin on 17 February 2017 in connection with the commemoration of the 75th anniversary of the bombing of Darwin in 1942. Japanese Prime Minister Shinzo Abe visited the memorial on 17 November 2018 and laid a wreath in memory of the crew of I-124. On 18 February 2019, AJANT planted a memorial pongamia tree (Millettia pinnata) at the site in connection with the commemoration of the 77th anniversary of the bombing of Darwin in a ceremony attended by Administrator of the Northern Territory Vicki O'Halloran, the Japanese ambassador to Australia, and the U.S. Consul General to Australia.

== Virtual dive experience ==
In October 2021, the Government of Australia's Northern Territory and the Australian Institute of Marine Science collaborated to map the wreck of I-124 using remote sonar sensing equipment. Dr John McCarthy, a maritime archaeologist at Flinders University in Adelaide, South Australia, then collaborated with the Northern Territory Heritage Branch to use the sonar data to create a "virtual dive experience" on the wreck, with narration in both English and Japanese. Both the English- and Japanese-narrated versions of the video were posted on YouTube and the Oculus platform ahead of the 80th anniversary of the sinking of I-124 on 20 January 2022.

== Bibliography ==
- Boyd, Carl, and Akihiko Yoshida. The Japanese Submarine Force and World War II. Annapolis, Maryland: Naval Institute Press, 1995. ISBN 1-55750-015-0.
- Lewis, Tom. Sensuikan I-124. Darwin: Tall Stories, 1997.
- Lewis, Tom. Darwin's Submarine I-124. South Australia: Avonmore Books, 2011.
- Viglietti, Brian M. & Wright, David L. (2000). "Question 4/99: Loss of the Submarine I-124". Warship International. XXXVII (2): 201, 203.
- Wright, David L. (2001). "Question 4/99: Loss of Japanese Submarine I-124". Warship International. XXXVIII (2). International Naval Research Organization: 149–150. ISSN 0043-0374.
