= USS Gamble =

Wickes-class destroyer

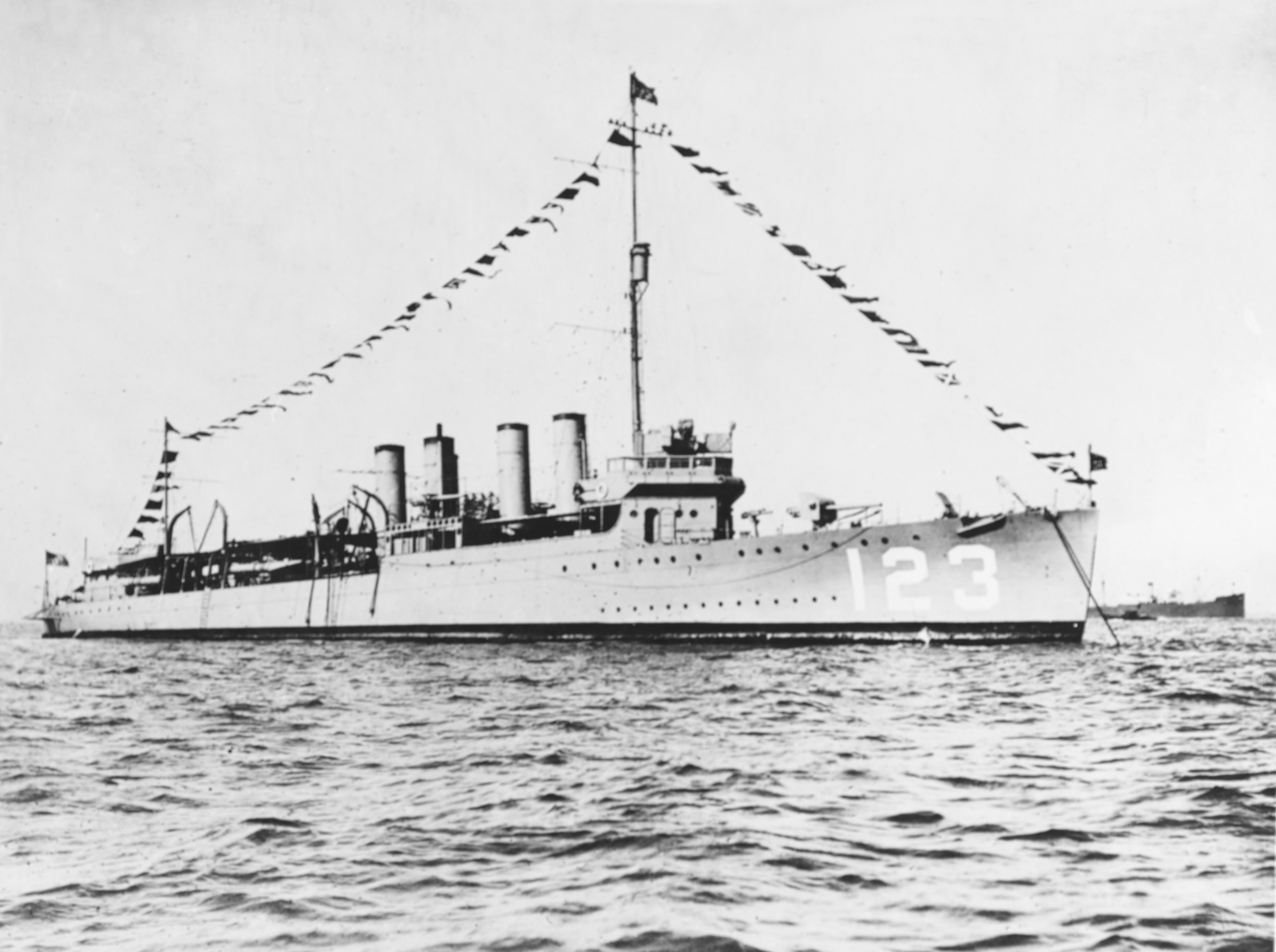
- USS Gamble at anchor

History

United States
- Name: Gamble
- Namesake: Peter Gamble and John M. Gamble
- Builder: Newport News Shipbuilding & Dry Dock Company, Newport News, Virginia
- Laid down: 12 November 1917
- Launched: 11 May 1918
- Commissioned: 29 November 1918
- Decommissioned: 17 June 1922
- Identification: DD-123
- Recommissioned: 24 May 1930
- Decommissioned: 22 December 1937
- Reclassified: 13 June 1930 (DM-15)
- Recommissioned: 25 September 1939
- Decommissioned: 1 June 1945
- Fate: Sunk by scuttling, 16 July 1945

General characteristics
- Class & type: Wickes-class destroyer
- Displacement: 1,090 tons (1,108 t)
- Length: 314 ft 5 in (95.8 m)
- Beam: 31 ft 9 in (9.7 m)
- Draft: 8 ft 8 in (2.6 m)
- Speed: 35 knots (65 km/h)
- Complement: 113 officers and enlisted
- Armament: 4 × 4 in (102 mm)/50 guns; 2 × 3 in (76 mm)/23 guns; 12 × 21 in (533 mm) torpedo tubes; 1 × depth charge projector; 2 × depth charge tracks

USS Gamble (DD–123/DM-15) was a Wickes-class destroyer in the United States Navy during World War I, later converted to a minelayer in World War II.

== Namesakes ==
Peter Gamble was born on 5 November 1793 in Bordentown, New Jersey. He was appointed midshipman on 16 January 1809 and served on Thomas Macdonough's flagship USS Saratoga in the Battle of Lake Champlain. He was killed in action while in the act of sighting his gun on 11 September 1814. Macdonough deplored Gamble's loss and commended his gallantry in action.

John M. Gamble was the brother of Peter Gamble and achieved the rank of Brevet Lieutenant Colonel in the United States Marine Corps.

No other ships in the United States Navy have borne this name.

== Construction and commissioning ==
Gamble was launched 11 May 1918 by the Newport News Shipbuilding & Dry Dock Company, Newport News, Virginia, sponsored by Miss Evelyn H. Jackson, a relative of Secretary of the Navy Josephus Daniels. The ship was commissioned at Norfolk on 29 November 1918.

== Service history ==
After shakedown training out of the Virginia Capes, Gamble sailed from New York City on 13 January 1919 to take part in maneuvers off Cuba; Key West, Florida; and the New England seaboard until June 1919. Following overhaul at Norfolk, she joined the Pacific Fleet at San Diego 7 August 1919 and operated along the Pacific coast until placed in reserve status in the Mare Island Navy Yard 1 December 1919. In October 1920, she came out of reserve and assisted the flotilla in torpedo practice; maneuvered with the Battle Force; and cruised along the California coast as a training ship for reservists. She decommissioned at San Diego on 17 June 1922.

Gamble recommissioned on 24 May 1930; was reclassified (DM-15) on 13 June, and converted into a light minelayer at the Mare Island Navy Yard. Arriving at Pearl Harbor from the West Coast, she became flagship of Mine Squadron 2 in July 1930 and later served as flagship of Mine Division 1, Mine Squadron 1. She patrolled Hawaiian waters instructing naval reservists in mine warfare and acted as plane guard and radio tracker for seaplanes, each year participating in fleet readiness and fleet problems until she returned to San Diego where she decommissioned on 22 December 1937. Recommissioning on 25 September 1939 as Europe was plunged into World War II, she joined Mine Division 5 in patrol and schoolship duties out of San Francisco. In April 1941, she proceeded to Pearl Harbor for war readiness patrol in Hawaiian waters as a unit of Mine Division 2.

=== World War II ===
On 7 December 1941, Gamble had returned from offshore patrol, when her peaceful routine was broken by the first of the Japanese carrier-based planes which attacked American ships in the harbor. Gamble's gunners joined the fire of other warships and saw one enemy plane fall into the water on her port beam. When the U.S. Navy submarine USS Thresher (SS-200) surfaced off Pearl Harbor later that day in attempt to enter the harbor and get medical attention for a severely injured crewman, Gamble mistook her for a Japanese submarine and opened gunfire on her as she surfaced, forcing her to submerge again immediately. By the time Thresher was able to reach Pearl Harbor on 8 December, her injured crewman had died.

After the attack on Pearl Harbor, Gamble took antisubmarine patrol station in the screen of the aircraft carrier Enterprise, and later guarded the approaches to Pearl Harbor. In mid-February 1942, she headed south in the escort for a convoy to Pago Pago, American Samoa, then joined Ramsay in laying a protective minefield off Tutuila. At the end of March the two minelayers shifted to the Fiji Islands, to lay a minefield in Nadi waters from 7–14 April. Returning to Pearl Harbor for heavier armament, Gamble helped safeguard convoys to Midway during the time of that crucial and historic battle, then headed south with Breese and Tracy to lay a defensive minefield off the entrance to Second Channel, Espiritu Santo, New Hebrides Islands.

On 27 August 1942, Gamble joined a task unit headed to Guadalcanal. Although designated a destroyer-minelayer, the old vessel still carried antisubmarine gear. On the morning of 29 August, when her lookouts spotted a large enemy submarine, she immediately went into action. After several depth charge attacks, Gamble ran through large oil slicks, found deck planking, and observed a large air bubble break the surface. Later her victim was identified as I-123, whose dying radio had signaled "under heavy enemy attack." That afternoon she proceeded at full speed to Nura Island where she rescued four stranded aviators from the aircraft carrier Saratoga. Continuing to aid in the struggle for Guadalcanal, she transported 158 Marines to the island on 31 August, patrolled off Lunga Roads, then on 5 September assisted in freeing William Ward Burrows and escorted her to Espiritu Santo, New Hebrides Islands. Her patrol, escort, and transport duty continued as the drive for Guadalcanal pressed on to victory.

Five minutes after midnight on 6 May 1943, Gamble, with Preble and Breese, turned simultaneously in rain squalls which broke at times to disclose each to the other in perfect formation. Making 15 knots (28 km/h), each ship dropped a mine every 12 seconds, planting over 250 mines in 17 minutes across Blackett Strait, the western entrance to Kula Gulf and directly in the favorite route of the Japanese "Tokyo Express." The ships then sped north to join the protective screen of Rear Admiral Walden L. Ainsworth's cruiser-destroyer force before refueling at Tulagi. On the night of 7/8 May, four Japanese destroyers entered the mined waters. One, Kuroshio, went down, two others, Oyashio and Kagerō, were badly damaged and sent out calls for help that brought Michishio to the scene. Aircraft, alerted by a coastwatcher, intercepted the rescue operation, sinking the two destroyers and sending Michishio limping back to port, badly damaged.

On 30 June 1943, during the invasion of New Georgia, Gamble laid a string of mines off the beachhead, before returning to Tulagi. In July welcome orders sent her back to the United States for overhaul. She headed west again on 20 September 1943. Her minelaying duties then brought her to Empress Augusta Bay from 1–2 November 1943 to support landing operations; Bougainville Strait, 7–8 November; Purvis Bay, Florida Island, 23–24 November, thence to the New Hebrides Islands for escort duty among the Solomons until she returned to San Francisco on 12 October 1944.

After overhaul and refresher training, Gamble departed San Diego on 7 January 1945, en route via Hawaii and the Marshalls to Iwo Jima where she arrived on 17 February, to lend fire support to the various sweeping units, and to explode floating mines. During her shelling a direct hit on an ammunition dump exploded the enemy magazine at the foot of Mount Suribachi.

=== Fate ===
On 18 February 1945, Gamble was hit just above the waterline by two 250 lb (113 kg) bombs. Both firerooms immediately flooded and she became dead in the water with two holes in her bottom as all hands fought raging fires, jettisoned topside weight and shored damaged bulkheads. Five men were killed, one missing in action, and eight wounded. As U.S. Marines stormed the shores of Iwo Jima the next day, Gamble was taken in tow by Dorsey, who turned her over to LSM-126 for passage to Saipan. She arrived at Saipan on 24 February and went alongside Hamul for repair.

Gamble was towed from Saipan to Guam May 16–17, 1945 by USS ATR-52.

Some hope remained for Gamble for a long time, but on 1 June 1945 she decommissioned, and, on 16 July, she was towed outside Apra Harbor, Guam and sunk.

== Awards ==
Gamble received seven battle stars for service in World War II.
