= USS Skate (SS-305) =

Submarine of the United States

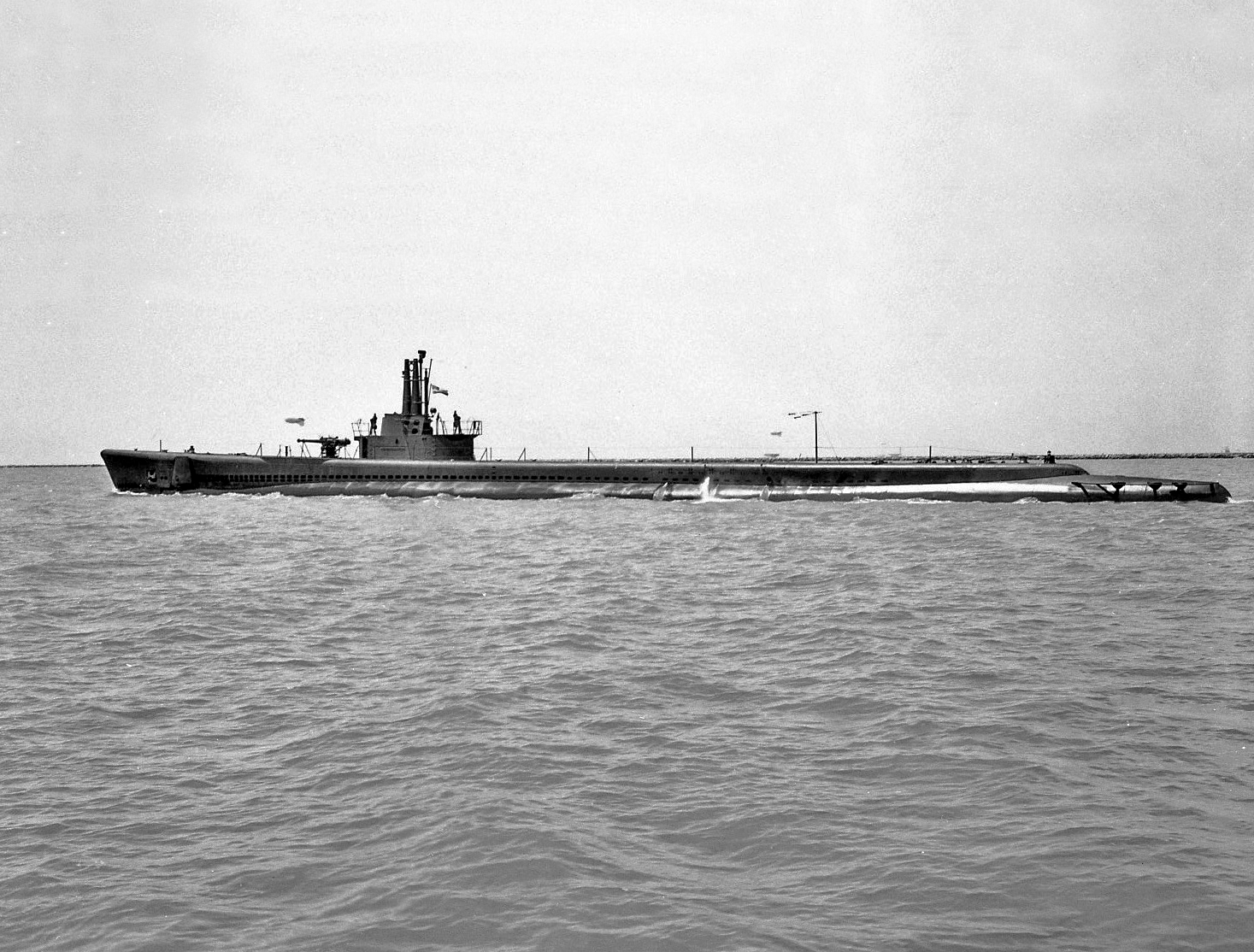
- Skate in July 1943

History

United States
- Namesake: Skate (fish)
- Builder: Mare Island Naval Shipyard
- Laid down: 1 August 1942
- Launched: 4 March 1943
- Commissioned: 15 April 1943
- Decommissioned: 11 December 1946
- Stricken: 21 October 1948
- Fate: Sunk as a target off Southern California coast, 5 October 1948

General characteristics
- Class & type: Balao-class diesel-electric submarine
- Displacement: 1,526 long tons (1,550 t) surfaced; 2,424 long tons (2,463 t) submerged
- Length: 311 ft 10 in (95.05 m) (95.0 m)
- Beam: 27 ft 4 in (8.33 m)
- Draft: 16 ft 10 in (5.13 m) maximum
- Propulsion: 4 × Fairbanks-Morse Model 38D8-1/8 9-cylinder opposed-piston diesel engines driving electrical generators; 2 × 126-cell Sargo batteries; 4 × high-speed Elliott electric motors with reduction gears; 2 × propellers; 5,400 shp (4.0 MW) surfaced; 2,740 shp (2.04 MW) submerged
- Speed: 20.25 knots (37.50 km/h) surfaced; 8.75 knots (16.21 km/h) submerged
- Range: 11,000 nautical miles (20,000 km) surfaced at 10 knots (19 km/h)
- Endurance: 48 hours at 2 knots (3.7 km/h) submerged; 75 days on patrol
- Test depth: 400 feet (120 m)
- Complement: 10 officers, 70–71 enlisted
- Armament: 10 × 21-inch (533 mm) torpedo tubes; 6 forward, 4 aft; 24 torpedoes; 1 × 5-inch (127 mm) / 25 caliber deck gun; Bofors 40 mm and Oerlikon 20 mm cannon

USS Skate (SS-305) was a Balao-class submarine in service with the United States Navy from 1943 to 1946. She was used as a target ship in the 1946 atomic bomb tests and finally sunk as a target ship in October 1948.

== History ==
Skate was laid down at the Mare Island Naval Shipyard of Vallejo, California, 1 August 1942. She was launched on 4 March 1943, sponsored by Mrs. Ethel L. Shamer, wife of Captain George P. Shamer, Supply Officer of the Mare Island Naval Shipyard, and commissioned on 15 April.

=== First War Patrol ===
Following shakedown off the California coast, Skate sailed to Pearl Harbor and on 25 September 1943, headed toward Wake Island and her first war patrol during which she performed lifeguard duty for the aircraft carriers during airstrikes against that Japanese-held island. At dawn on 6 October, the submarine was strafed by enemy aircraft, mortally wounding one of her officers as he attempted to assist wounded airmen from a life raft. The next day, Skate closed to within 5,000 yards (4,600 m) of the beach, in the face of heavy enemy bombardment, to rescue two downed aviators. While searching for a third, she was attacked by a Japanese dive bomber, and was forced to dive to escape. After a short return to Midway Island, Skate returned to Wake Island and rescued four additional airmen before terminating her first patrol at Midway on 29 October.

=== Second War Patrol ===
On 15 November, Skate departed Midway for her second war patrol, conducted off Truk in the Caroline Islands. On 25 November, she sighted the masts of five warships; but, after firing a spread of torpedoes at overlapping aircraft carriers, she was forced down by depth charging from the escort ships.

On 30 November 1943, Skate attacked Japanese carriers Zuihō, Chuyō, and Unyō without success.

While north of Truk on 21 December 1943, the submarine torpedoed and sank the cargo ship Terukawa Maru.

==== Torpedoing of the Yamato ====
On December 25th, Skate was scouting for Japanese ships when she spotted a massive target, the Japanese "super battleship" Yamato ferrying troops to Truk. The Yamato-class was the largest and most powerful battleship ever built, displacing 72,808 tons and armed with nine 18.1-inch (46 cm) main guns, the largest guns ever mounted on a warship. Seizing the opportunity, Skate fired four torpedoes, and though Yamato dodged most of them, one made its mark near her turret one.

This uncovered a design flaw present in the battleship. The ship's torpedo defense system was very minimal, meaning torpedoes would mostly impact on the 16.1-inch (41 cm) thick armored belt. Given the belt was too thick to be welded, it was riveted instead, and torpedo hits would pop open numerous rivets and disconnect sections of the belt and lead to far more flooding than most Japanese sailors expected. Still, given the nature of the Yamato, damage wasn't very significant. Only about 3,000 tons of water flooded the ship, which while perhaps worrying for a 35,000 ton treaty battleship, was only around 4% of Yamato's displacement. Despite the damage, Yamato remained an active warship until the 10th of January, and repairs lasted only 18 days.

=== Third and Fourth War Patrols ===
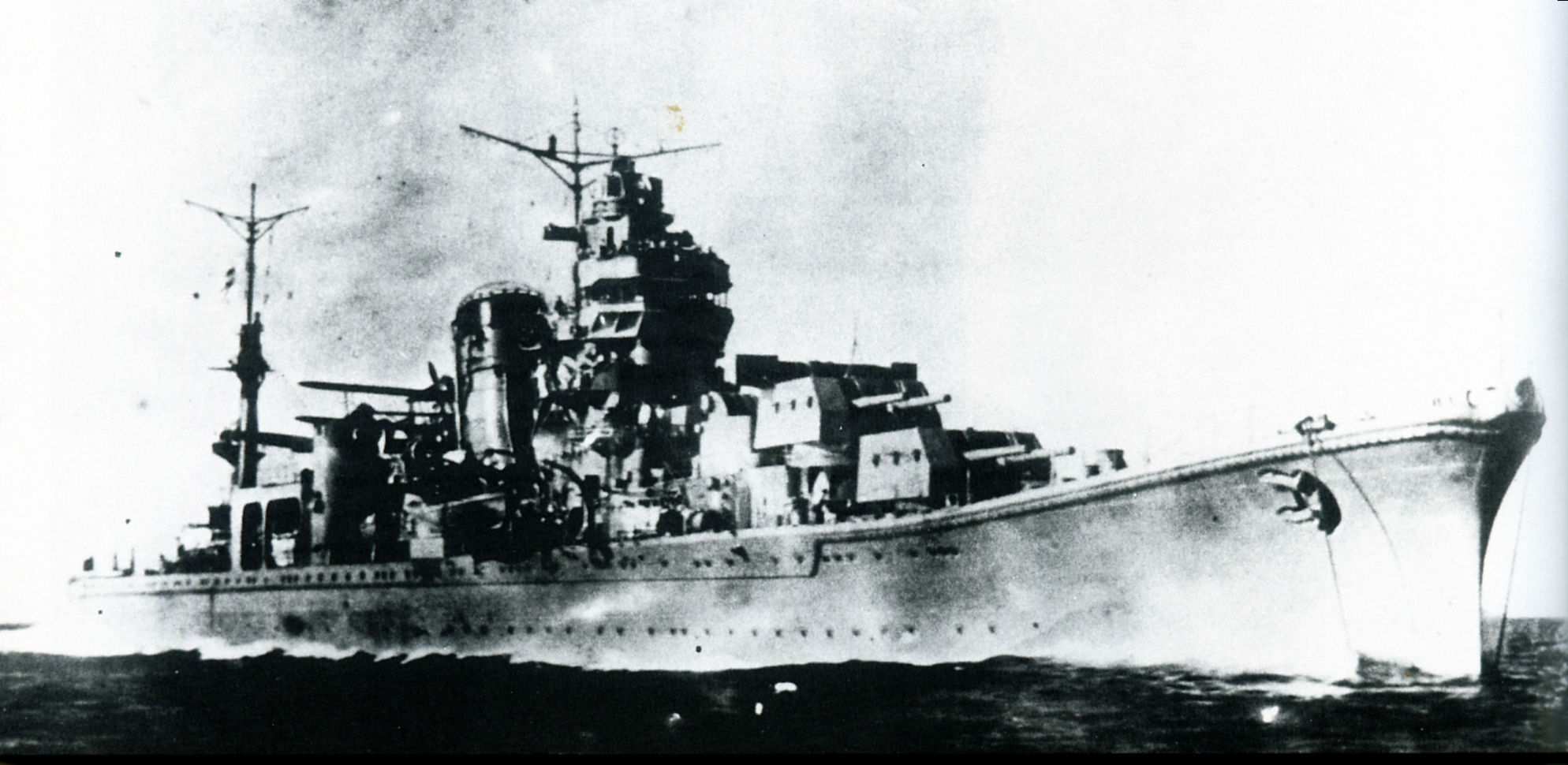
Japanese light cruiser Agano.

Skate's third war patrol was again conducted in the area of the Carolines, in support of Operation Hailstone, the carrier airstrikes on Truk. Skate departed Midway on 5 February 1944. On 16 February, the evening before the airstrike, Skate intercepted a Japanese light cruiser, which had survived a previous torpedo attack by submarine Scamp. Skate launched four torpedoes, two of which hit, engulfing the ship in a shroud of smoke as the submarine submerged to evade heavy depth charging from the enemy escorts. She later returned to the scene of the attack, but, before another torpedo could be launched, the cruiser rolled to port and sank. It was later determined the cruiser sunk was the Japanese light cruiser Agano. Following the airstrikes and further patrol in the area, the submarine returned to Pearl Harbor on 17 March.

During her fourth war patrol, off the Bonin Islands from 11 April to 31 May, Skate scored hits on an enemy cargo ship for unconfirmed damage and, on 14 May 1944, sank an enemy sampan in a surface attack, taking three prisoners of war.

=== Fifth, Sixth and Seventh War Patrols ===
Skate departed Midway on 23 June 1944 on her fifth war patrol, conducted off the Kuril Islands. On 7 July, she intercepted a convoy of five ships and escorting destroyers, fired three torpedoes, and sank the trailing destroyer, Usugumo. The submarine was then forced deep by the other escorts and depth charged for over two hours before escaping. On 15 July, the submarine sank a cargo ship taking two prisoners and, on the following day, another cargo ship was also sent to the bottom. Skate terminated her fifth patrol at Pearl Harbor on 7 August.

Departing Pearl Harbor on 9 September, Skate sailed for the Ryukyu Islands and her sixth war patrol, during which she performed photographic reconnaissance of Okinawa and, on 29 September 1944, sank a small patrol craft and a cargo ship. Following her return to Pearl Harbor, she got underway for a complete overhaul at Hunters Point Navy Yard, San Francisco, California.

Skate got underway from Pearl Harbor for her seventh war patrol on 11 April 1945, to form a coordinated attack group with other submarines and patrol in the Sea of Japan. On the morning of 10 June, she encountered I-122, a Japanese submarine on the surface returning to port. As the enemy crossed her bow, Skate launched two torpedoes with two hits, sinking the target. Two days later, while off the Nanto Peninsula, she evaded gunfire of enemy ships and an attack by an enemy escort to sink three cargo ships. Skate terminated her seventh war patrol at Pearl Harbor on 4 July 1945.

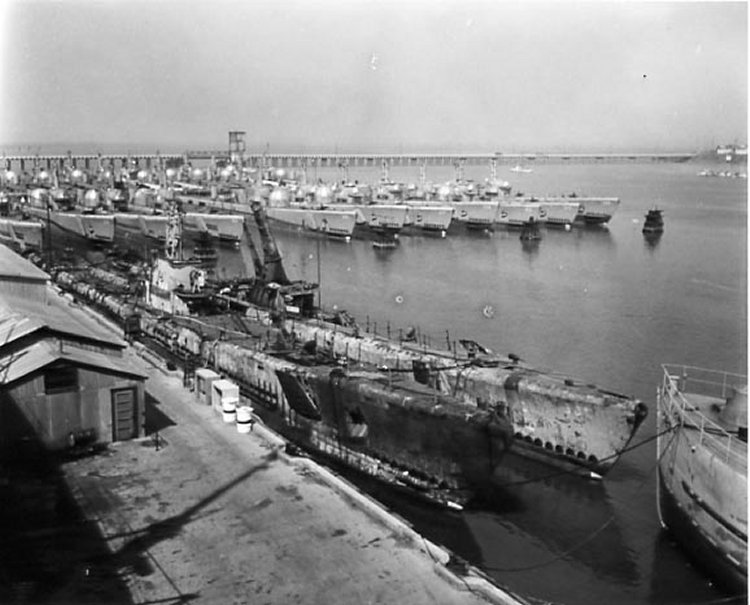
USS Skipjack and Skate laid up at Mare Island in October 1947

=== End of World War II and fate ===
Skate departed Pearl Harbor on 5 August 1945 for her eighth war patrol; but, while en route to the patrol area, she received word of the Japanese surrender and returned to port, and then set sail for the United States arriving at San Diego, on 6 September. For the next four months, she participated in training operations along the west coast, and then sailed to Pearl Harbor arriving on 9 January 1946. On 21 May, she departed for Bikini Atoll, Marshall Islands, to be used as a target ship in Operation Crossroads, the atomic bomb tests.

Skate was moored directly astern of the battleship Nevada, the target ship for test "Able". Skate's crew was transferred to a transport where they maintained Skate's log with entries reading "Moored as before, no one on board." The bomber missed Nevada and the bomb detonated above and astern of Skate, mangling the submarine's conning tower and raising the main ballast tank vents but leaving the pressure hull intact. The crew returned to the submarine and, finding the interior offered preferable living conditions to the transport, was able to get the surfaced submarine underway at 18 kn (33 km/h; 21 mph).

The crew was again transferred to the transport after Skate moored on the fringe of the formation for test "Baker", which caused no further physical damage, but coated the submarine exterior with radioactive isotopes. When the crew was unable to remove the radioactivity, they were transferred to the submarine tender Fulton. Skate was towed back to Pearl Harbor, where she was moored in an isolated berth. On 11 October, salvage vessel Clamp took Skate in tow and headed for San Francisco, and then to Mare Island Naval Shipyard where the submarine was inspected and then decommissioned on 11 December. Skate was expended as a torpedo target off the California coast on 5 October 1948, and struck from the Naval Vessel Register on 21 October 1948.

== Awards ==
Skate received eight battle stars for World War II service.
