= Indispensable Strait =

Waterway in the Solomon Islands

Coordinates: 9.00°S 160.53°E

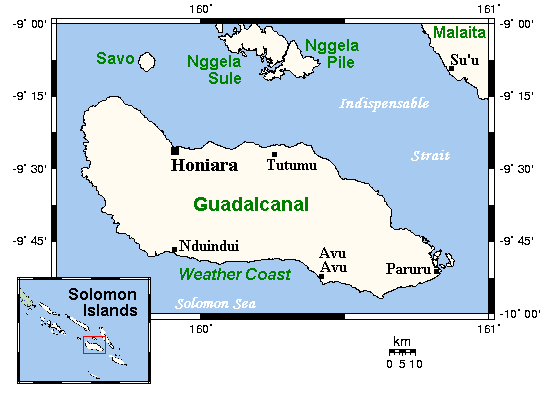
Indispensable Strait between Guadalcanal island and Malaita Island

Indispensable Strait is a waterway in the Solomon Islands, running about 200 kilometres (108 nmi; 124 mi) northwest-southeast from Santa Isabel to Makira (San Cristóbal), between the Nggela Islands and Guadalcanal to the southwest, and Malaita to the northeast.

Indispensable Strait is part of the navigation route for merchant shipping from Torres Strait to the Panama Canal. It is one of three major routes for merchant shipping through the Solomon Islands; the routes are the Bougainville Strait and Indispensable Strait, which link the Pacific Ocean, Solomon Sea and Coral Sea; and the Manning Strait that links the Pacific to New Georgia Sound, which is also known as ‘The Slot’, through which Japanese naval ships resupplied the garrison on Guadalcanal during the Pacific War.

The strait was first recorded on European maps after it was encountered by Captain William Wilkinson in the merchantman Indispensable in 1794. (Note: Findlay's Directory gives the year of discovery as 1790, but this date is in error.)
