= USS YP-290 =

U.S. Navy patrol boat during World War II

History
- Name: USS YP-290
- Builder: Campbell Machine, Seattle
- Laid down: 1937
- Launched: 1937
- Acquired: acquired by US Navy, 1942
- Stricken: 19 December 1945
- Honors and awards: American Campaign Medal; World War II Victory Medal
- Fate: unknown
- Notes: Call sign: NZMX

General characteristics
- Type: Patrol boat
- Tonnage: 188 gross register tons
- Length: 127 ft 9 in (38.94 m) o/a
- Beam: 30 m (98 ft)
- Propulsion: Diesel engine, 550 shp; 1 × screw

USS YP-290 (ex-Picoroto) was a converted fishing vessel which served as an auxiliary patrol boat in the U.S. Navy during World War II.

== History ==
She was laid down in 1937 at the Campbell Machine shipyard in Seattle, Washington as a wooden hulled tuna boat and christened the Picoroto. In 1942, soon after the attack on Pearl Harbor, the US government requisitioned 52 of the 79 tuna clippers (including the Picoroto) in the California fleet (49 by the U.S. Navy and 3 by the U.S. Army). Although slow at 10 knots, the wooden hulls of the tuna boats made them ideal for mine sweeping operations and their refrigerated holds suitable for delivery of perishables. In addition, their crews were already seasoned and with minimal training, ready for service. The Picoroto was painted grey and fitted with machine guns and depth charges. and was designated as a yard patrol boat (YP-290). Ships of this class were affectionately known as "Yippies".

She was sent to Hawaii where Admiral Chester W. Nimitz was preparing for the defense of Midway Island. YP-290 along with YP-284, YP-345, and YP-350, were assembled into Task Force (TF) 4 and assigned to protect and patrol the Northwestern Hawaiian Islands. On 20 May 1942, they set out from Pearl Harbor to posts at the several islets and islands that extended from Hawaii out to Midway Atoll: YP-290 went to Laysan Island while YP-284 to Lisianski Island, YP-345 went to Gardner Pinnacles, and YP-350 to Necker Island. The converted armed yacht Crystal took station at Pearl and Hermes Reef while seaplane tenders Thornton and Ballard, both converted destroyers, were stationed at French Frigate Shoals. The ships were tasked with patrolling their area of control, serving as a lookout for any enemy activity, and the rescuing of downed airman. The YPs also carried aviation gasoline, food, and water if needed at Midway Island. Nimitz had correctly surmised that the Japanese had used the outer Hawaiian Islands to refuel seaplanes to reconnoiter Pearl Harbor. In fact, the Japanese had on two occasions flown Kawanishi H8K "Emily" seaplanes to French Frigate Shoals where they met awaiting submarines to refuel. By denying the Japanese access, the Japanese were forced to cancel "Operation K" which entailed flying four H8Ks from Jaluit and Wotje in the Marshall Islands to the French Frigate Shoals and refueling them from submarines I-121 and I-123 so they could then fly on to Pearl Harbor and ascertain if the American carriers remained in port. If they had been successful, they would have found out that the American carriers had already departed Pearl Harbor.

On 19 December 1945, she was struck from the Naval List. In 1946, she was transferred to the United States Maritime Commission.
