= Japanese ship Shikinami =

At least three warships of Japan have borne the name Shikinami:

- Japanese gunboat Shikinami (1905), launched in 1893 as the Russian Gaidamak. She was scuttled at Port Arthur but was raised and commissioned by Japan in 1905. She was stricken about 1911
- Japanese destroyer Shikinami (1929), a Fubuki-class destroyer launched in 1929 and sunk in 1944
- JDS Shikinami (DD-106), an Ayanami-class destroyer launched in 1957 and stricken in 1987
