= USS YP-345 =

History

United States
- Name: YP-345 (ex-Yankee)
- Builder: Al Larson Boat Building, San Pedro, Los Angeles
- Sponsored by: Van Camp Sea Food Co. Inc.
- Completed: 1939
- Identification: 238205
- Fate: Sunk, unknown cause
- Notes: Call sign: WTJD

General characteristics
- Type: Fishing vessel
- Tonnage: 294 GRT tons
- Length: 32.3 m (106 ft 0 in) o/a
- Beam: 8.26 m (27 ft 1 in)
- Draft: 3.84 m (12 ft 7 in)
- Installed power: 490 shp 122 nhp
- Propulsion: 8-cyl. diesel engines, fuel oil
- Speed: 10 knots
- Crew: 17
- Armament: 2 x .50 caliber machine guns

USS YP-345 was a converted fishing vessel which served in the U.S. Navy during World War II.

== History ==
YP-345 was commissioned by the Van Camp Sea Food Co. Inc. of Los Angeles and built by Al Larson Boat Building at their San Pedro, California shipyard. She was completed in 1939 as a wooden hulled tuna boat and christened the Yankee. In 1942, soon after the attack on Pearl Harbor, the US government requisitioned 52 of the 79 tuna clippers (including the Yankee) in the California fleet (49 by the U.S. Navy and 3 by the U.S. Army). Although slow at 10 knots, the wooden hulls of the tuna boats made them ideal for mine sweeping operations and their refrigerated holds suitable for delivery of perishables. In addition, their crews were already seasoned and with minimal training, ready for service. The Yankee was painted grey and fitted with two .50 caliber machine guns and had the ability to fire depth charges. The Yankee was designated as a yard patrol boat (YP-345). Ships of this class were affectionately known as "Yippies".

She was sent to Hawaii where Admiral Chester W. Nimitz was preparing for the defense of Midway Island. YP-345 along with YP-284, YP-290, and YP-350, were assembled into Task Force (TF) 4 and assigned to protect and patrol the Northwestern Hawaiian Islands. On 20 May 1942, they set out from Pearl Harbor to posts at the several islets and islands that extended from Hawaii out to Midway Atoll: YP-345 went to Gardner Pinnacles while YP-284 to Lisianski Island, YP-290 to Laysan Island, and YP-350 to Necker Island. The converted armed yacht Crystal took station at Pearl and Hermes Reef while seaplane tenders Thornton and Ballard, both converted destroyers, were stationed at French Frigate Shoals. The ships were tasked with patrolling their area of control, serving as a lookout for any enemy activity, and the rescuing of downed airman. The YPs also carried aviation gasoline, food, and water if needed at Midway Island. Nimitz had correctly surmised that the Japanese had used the outer Hawaiian Islands to refuel seaplanes to reconnoiter Pearl Harbor. In fact, the Japanese had on two occasions flown Kawanishi H8K "Emily" seaplanes to French Frigate Shoals where they met awaiting submarines to refuel. By denying the Japanese access, the Japanese were forced to cancel "Operation K" which entailed flying four H8Ks from Jaluit and Wotje in the Marshall Islands to the French Frigate Shoals and refueling them from submarines I-121 and I-123 so they could then fly on to Pearl Harbor and ascertain if the American carriers remained in port. If they had been successful, they would have found out that the American carriers had already departed Pearl Harbor.

YP-345 returned to Pearl Harbor after the Battle of Midway. On 31 October 1942, while traveling from French Frigate Shoals to Midway Island, YP-345 was lost to unknown causes 80 miles northeast of Laysan Island. All 17 crew members perished. She was one of the 12 converted tuna clippers lost while on duty during World War II.
