= Japanese destroyer Isonami =

At least three warships of Japan have borne the name Isonami:

- Japanese destroyer Isonami (1908), a Kamikaze-class destroyer launched in 1908, re-rated as a minesweeper and renamed W-7 in 1928, she was stricken in 1930
- Japanese destroyer Isonami (1927), a Fubuki-class destroyer launched in 1927 and sunk in 1943
- JDS Isonami (DD-104), an Ayanami-class destroyer launched in 1957 and stricken in 1987
