= Evacuation of Kiska (1943) =

1943 Japanese withdrawal from the Aleutian Islands

- Part of the Aleutian Islands campaign of World War II
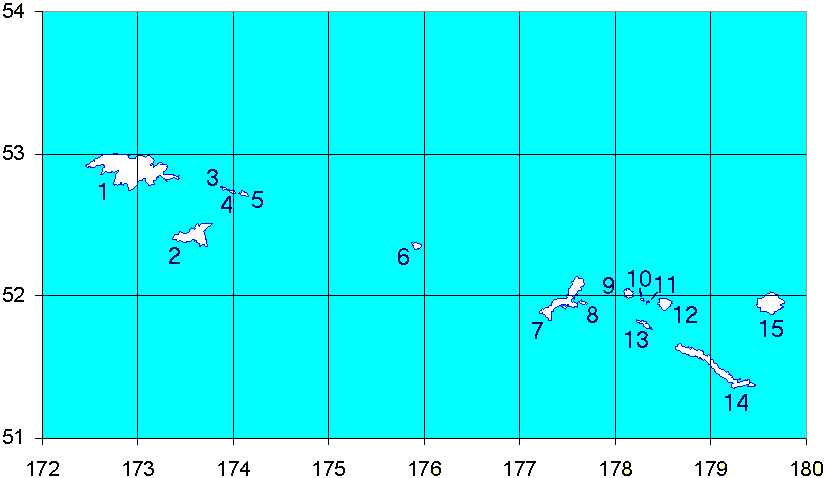
- Map of the western Aleutian Islands showing Kiska and Attu
Date	27 May – 29 July 1943
Location	Kiska, Aleutian Islands, Alaska Territory
Result	Japanese victory Successful evacuation of Japanese garrison

Belligerents
Empire of Japan	United States

Commanders and leaders
Shiro Kawase; Masatomi Kimura	Thomas C. Kinkaid

Strength
First Phase: 15 submarines Second Phase: 2 light cruisers 11 destroyers 1 auxiliary cruiser 1 escort ship	Naval blockade: 2 battleships 4 heavy cruisers 1 light cruiser 9 destroyers

Casualties and losses
3 submarines sunk 1 destroyer damaged	Battle of the Pips: 0 (ammunition expended); Operation Cottage: ~92 killed, ~200 wounded (mostly friendly fire and accidents)

The Evacuation of Kiska (Japanese: キスカ島撤退作戦, Kiska-tō Tettai Sakusen), officially designated Operation Ke (Ke-Go), was the withdrawal of Japanese forces from Kiska Island in the Aleutian Islands between 27 May and 29 July 1943 during the Second World War.

Following the loss of the neighboring island of Attu to American forces in May 1943, the Japanese Imperial General Headquarters decided to abandon the Aleutians. While an initial attempt to evacuate the Kiska garrison via submarine resulted in losses, a subsequent surface-ship operation commanded by Rear Admiral Masatomi Kimura completed the evacuation, an event some Japanese historians later referred to as the "Miracle of Kiska." Using the region's frequent thick fog, Kimura's task force passed through the American naval blockade, evacuated over 5,000 men in under an hour, and departed without losing a ship.

Unaware of the Japanese withdrawal, Allied forces launched an amphibious invasion of the island on 15 August 1943, codenamed Operation Cottage. The operation resulted in casualties due to friendly fire, booby traps, and vehicle accidents, leading American naval historian Samuel Eliot Morison to describe it as "the largest and most practical landing exercise" in history.

== Background ==
In June 1942, Japanese forces occupied the islands of Attu and Kiska as part of the diversionary Aleutian Islands campaign linked to the Battle of Midway. The occupation of American territory prompted a campaign to isolate and eventually retake the islands.

By early 1943, the American naval blockade and air raids had reduced the capabilities of the Japanese garrisons. On 11 May 1943, American forces launched Operation Landcrab, invading Attu. After resistance from the Japanese forces, the Attu garrison was defeated following a final banzai charge on 29 May.

With Attu lost, the 6,000-man Japanese garrison on Kiska—commanded by Lieutenant General Kiichiro Higuchi (Army) and Rear Admiral Katsuzo Akiyama (Navy)—was isolated. The island was situated between the American airbase on Amchitka and the recaptured Attu. Recognizing the impossibility of holding the island or sending reinforcements, Japanese Imperial General Headquarters ordered the abandonment of the Aleutians and the evacuation of the Kiska garrison on 21 May 1943.

== First Phase: Submarine Evacuation ==
The initial evacuation plan, part of the broader Operation Ke, relied on submarines to avoid American surface and air superiority. The Japanese Navy was reluctant to risk destroyers in the Aleutians, having already suffered destroyer losses in the Solomon Islands campaign.

Beginning on 27 May, a force of 15 submarines under Rear Admiral Takeo Konda attempted to ferry troops and supplies to Kiska while evacuating the sick and wounded. However, the American blockade, utilizing radar and patrol craft, proved effective. Submarines were repeatedly detected in the fog and subjected to depth charging and surface gunfire. The submarine I-9 was sunk by the destroyer USS Frazier on 15 June, and I-24 was sunk by USS PC-487 on 11 June.

By late June, the Japanese had lost three submarines and damaged several others, managing to evacuate only 800 personnel while delivering limited supplies. Due to the high losses, which were noted by Emperor Hirohito, the Japanese Navy canceled the submarine evacuation on 23 June.

== Second Phase: Surface Evacuation ==
=== Preparation and deception ===
With submarines deemed vulnerable, command of the evacuation was given to Rear Admiral Masatomi Kimura, commander of the 1st Torpedo Squadron. Kimura's plan relied on the Aleutian fog to conceal his surface ships from American aircraft and radar.

Kimura's force consisted of two light cruisers (Abukuma and Kiso) and 11 destroyers, including the Shimakaze, which was equipped with Type 22 radar and radar detectors—technology for navigating in low visibility. To deceive the enemy, the Japanese applied camouflage: the three-funnel cruisers had one funnel painted white to mimic the silhouette of two-funnel American cruisers, and destroyers were fitted with dummy funnels.

=== First sortie and retreat ===
Kimura's fleet departed Paramushiro in the Kuril Islands on 10 July. However, as the fleet approached Kiska, the fog lifted. Knowing that a surface force would be targeted by American bombers from Amchitka, Kimura made the decision to abort the mission and return to base on 15 July.

This retreat drew criticism from the Imperial Japanese Navy General Staff and the 5th Fleet command, who demanded an immediate advance into Kiska regardless of the weather. Despite accusations of hesitation, Kimura spent the following days fishing from the deck of his cruiser while waiting for a favorable weather forecast.

=== Second sortie and collisions ===
On 22 July, meteorologists predicted a sustained fog bank would cover Kiska. Kimura sortied again. During the transit through low-visibility fog, the fleet suffered a series of collisions: the destroyer Wakaba was damaged after colliding with the cruiser Abukuma, and the Hatsushimo struck the Naganami. Wakaba was forced to return to base, but Kimura continued with his remaining ships.

=== The "Miracle of Kiska" ===
On 29 July 1943, Kimura's fleet approached Kiska. The American blockade force had temporarily withdrawn to refuel, leaving the island unguarded.

Entering Kiska Harbor under the cover of fog, the Japanese ships anchored at 13:40. The garrison had been organized for departure. Using Daihatsu landing craft in a continuous shuttle, the Japanese loaded 5,183 men onto the cruisers and destroyers in 55 minutes. To maximize speed and weight capacity, soldiers were ordered to discard their rifles into the ocean, and the landing craft were scuttled rather than recovered.

By 14:30, the fleet departed at 28 knots back into the fog. Later that evening, the Japanese fleet passed close to an American submarine, but the vessel's commander mistook the camouflaged Japanese ships for an American task force and did not attack. Kimura's fleet returned to Paramushiro on 1 August without losing a man to enemy action.

== Allied Movements ==
=== Battle of the Pips ===
Unaware of the Japanese evacuation, American Rear Admiral Thomas C. Kinkaid maintained a blockade. On 27 July, American radar operators picked up a series of anomalous contacts 90 miles southwest of Kiska. Kinkaid's task force, including the battleships USS Mississippi and USS Idaho, opened fire in what became known as the Battle of the Pips. The fleet fired hundreds of heavy shells into the ocean. The "pips" were later determined to be radar anomalies caused by atmospheric conditions or flocks of birds, but the engagement drew the American heavy ships away from Kiska hours before Kimura's arrival.

=== Operation Cottage ===
Convinced that the Japanese were still on Kiska, Allied forces launched Operation Cottage on 15 August 1943. A fleet of nearly 100 ships delivered 34,000 American and Canadian troops to the island's beaches.

Advancing through fog and volcanic terrain, the troops frequently mistook each other for the enemy. Friendly fire incidents, combined with Japanese booby traps and landmines, resulted in 92 Allied deaths and over 200 wounded. When the fog lifted and the island was secured, the Allies found abandoned bunkers, scattered equipment, and a few dogs left behind by the Japanese, including a dog named "Explosion" (later renamed "Katsu" by American troops).

== Japanese "Parting Gifts" ==
Before departing, the Japanese garrison left behind several psychological traps and messages for the anticipated American invaders:

- The Plague Sign: A medical officer erected a sign outside a bunker reading "Plague Patients Quarantine Area." When translated by American intelligence officer and future Japanologist Donald Keene, the sign caused concern, prompting requests to San Francisco for plague serum.
- Desecration of Flags: In the underground command post, Americans found cushions upholstered with the Stars and Stripes, intended to be sat upon by Japanese officers.
- Blackboard Message: A chalkboard read: "You are dancing to Roosevelt's foolish orders."
- Respectful Burials: The Japanese had given burials to the bodies of American aviators shot down over the island, erecting wooden crosses with English epitaphs.

== Evaluation and Legacy ==
The Evacuation of Kiska is noted as a successful tactical withdrawal in naval history. Emperor Hirohito praised the operation, noting that the extraction of the garrison was satisfactory and contributed to the broader war effort.

Rear Admiral Kimura's decision to abort the first sortie is studied as an example of tactical patience. By refusing to succumb to the Japanese military's cultural pressure for unprepared attacks, he preserved his fleet and waited for the conditions necessary for the operation.

Also contributing to the operation was the decision by Army Lieutenant General Kiichiro Higuchi. Recognizing that heavy equipment would slow the loading process, Higuchi authorized the abandonment of all artillery, vehicles, and small arms without seeking prior approval from Tokyo, a decision that facilitated the 55-minute evacuation.

== See also ==
- Operation Ke – The Japanese evacuation of Guadalcanal
- Operation Cottage – The Allied invasion of Kiska
- Battle of the Pips – The phantom naval engagement
- Aleutian Islands campaign

== Bibliography ==
- Garfield, Brian (1995). The Thousand-Mile War: World War II in Alaska and the Aleutians. University of Alaska Press. ISBN 978-0912006772.
- Morison, Samuel Eliot (1951). Aleutians, Gilberts and Marshalls, June 1942-April 1944. History of United States Naval Operations in World War II. Vol. VII. Little, Brown and Company.
- Defense Agency Defense Research Institute (1979). Senshi Sōsho: Submarine History (in Japanese). Vol. 98. Asagumo Shinbunsha.
- Defense Agency Defense Research Institute (1969). Senshi Sōsho: Northeast Area Naval Operations (in Japanese). Vol. 29. Asagumo Shinbunsha.
