= JDS Shikinami =

Ayanami-class destroyer

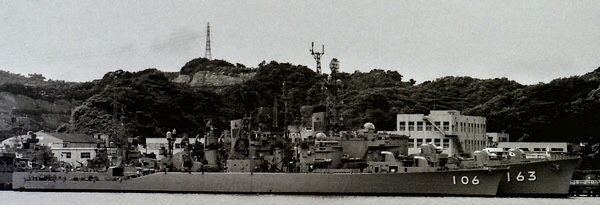
- JDS Shikinami

History

Japan
- Name: Shikinami; (しきなみ)
- Namesake: Shikinami (1929)
- Ordered: 1955
- Builder: Mitsui, Tamano
- Laid down: 14 December 1956
- Launched: 25 September 1957
- Commissioned: 15 March 1958
- Decommissioned: 1 July 1987
- Reclassified: TV-3503
- Home port: Kure
- Identification: Pennant number: DD-106
- Fate: Scrapped

General characteristics
- Class & type: Ayanami-class destroyer
- Displacement: 1,720 t (1,690 long tons) standard; 2,500 t (2,500 long tons) full load
- Length: 109 m (358 ft)
- Beam: 10.7 m (35 ft)
- Depth: 8.1 m (26 ft 7 in)
- Complement: 220
- Armament: 6 × 3"/50 caliber Mk.22 guns; 4 × 533 mm (21 in) torpedo tubes; 2 × ASW torpedo racks; 2 × Hedgehog anti-submarine mortars; 2 × DCT (K-guns)

JDS Shikinami (DD-106) was the fourth ship of Ayanami-class destroyers.

== Construction and career ==
Shikinami was laid down at Mitsui Engineering & Shipbuilding Tamano Shipyard on 14 December 1956 and launched on 30 September 1957. She was commissioned on 14 March 1958.

On March 31, 1958, she was transferred to the Yokosuka District Force 8th Escort Corps. On October 25, the same year, the 8th Escort Corps was reorganized under the 1st Escort Corps group.

During the special repair work in 1963, the equipment was modernized, and the radio wave detection device (ESM) NORR-1, which had not been equipped, was installed in the rear cage, and the search sonar was installed in OQS-14. Replaced the attack sonar with OQY-2.

In March 1973, the short torpedo launcher was removed, and work was carried out to strengthen the anti-submarine attack capability with two 68-type triple short torpedo launchers.

On June 13, 1975, the 8th Escort Squadron was abolished and transferred to the 1st Training Squadron of the Training Squadron, and the fixed port was transferred to Kure.

In 1976, the ship was converted into a training ship with the escort ship registered, and the 4-unit long torpedo launcher was removed and a trainee auditorium was newly established.

On March 30, 1983, she was changed to a training ship and her registration number was changed to TV-3503.

She was removed from the register on July 1, 1987 with her sister ship JDS Isonami.

In 1988, she was dismantled at Furusawa Steel in Etajima.
