= USS YP-278 =

History

United States
- Name: USS YP-278
- Builder: Campbell Machine Company, San Diego, California
- Launched: 1937
- Acquired: 1942
- In service: 1942
- Out of service: 1946
- Fate: Returned to owner; sunk 9 July 1979

General characteristics
- Type: Store ship
- Displacement: 334 long tons (339 t)
- Length: 129 ft (39 m)
- Beam: 28 ft (8.5 m)
- Draft: 12 ft 5 in (3.78 m)
- Propulsion: 2 × 6-cylinder Union diesel engines, 2 propellers
- Armament: 1 × 20 mm gun; 1 × .50 cal. machine gun

USS YP-278 was a fishing trawler converted to an ocean-going refrigerator ship for the United States Navy, used to distribute food supplies in the Pacific theater during World War II.

== Early years ==
The fishing trawler was built in 1937 for Mr. Frederic Gonsalves, Jr., by the Campbell Machine Company of San Diego, California, and christened the Fishing Vessel FV Liberty. It was used to trawl for tuna fish in the western Pacific.

== Acquisition by the U.S. Navy during World War II ==
The Liberty was acquired for wartime use by the United States Navy in 1942 after it reportedly was hit and damaged by enemy fire during the attack on Pearl Harbor on 7 December 1941. It was subsequently designated Yard Patrol Craft YP-278. In 1942, the U. S. armed services, under Rear Admiral Calvin Hayes Cobb, responding to widespread complaints about armed service food, recognized the need to provide its servicemen in the southwestern Pacific theater with fresh fruits, vegetables, meats, and condiments. YP-278 was one of only a few private yachts seized by the Navy and converted to ocean-going refrigerator ships in order to enable the War Department to distribute food supplies from Australia and New Zealand rather than the more distant U. S. mainland. Once they began receiving better food, troops in the region were noted to be in better spirits. Thus YP-278 and its crew were among the war's most popular, hailed as lifesavers from one end of the southwest Pacific to the other.

== U. S. Navy service, 1942–1946 ==
From 1942 until the formal end of fighting on 14 August 1945 (V-J Day), the YP-278, under the command of Capt. Harry J. Conway (1942 until December 1944) and Lt. D. Dudley Bloom (December 1944-July 1945), ran food supplies to ports along the northern coast of Papua New Guinea (until February 1945) and to those Philippines safely under Allied control (March–August 1945) in preparation for a planned Allied invasion of mainland Japan that was to have taken place in September 1945. While in wartime service, the ship slept 16 crewmen and two officers. Accommodations for the crew were comparatively luxurious, with each berth separated from its neighbors by privacy curtains and dedicated reading lights. In such intimate quarters, ship commander Lt. Bloom mandated that crew and enlisted men eat the same fare, sitting at the same tables, Navy innovations in December 1944.

== Post-war use as a fishing vessel ==
After it was decommissioned in January 1946, the ship was returned to Mr. Gonsalves, its owner, until 1948, when Gonsalves sold her to the Sun Harbor Packing Company, which renamed her the Fishing Vessel FV Sun Splendor. In 1965, another tuna packer, J. B. Vattuone, purchased the Sun Splendor, renamed her the Fishing Vessel FV Invader, and trawled the oceans with her until she finally had outlived her usefulness.

== Final disposition ==
On 9 July 1979, the former USS YP-278 was sunk by collision at sea at 29.28°N 117.12°W, off the coast of the town of San Julio, Baja California, Mexico.

== See also ==
- D. Dudley Bloom, United States Navy officer and American businessman
- Naval Institute, Washington, D.C.
- Papua New Guinea
- Philippine Islands
- South Pacific, Rodgers and Hammerstein musical
