= USS YP-284 =

U.S. Navy WWII vessel

History

United States
- Name: YP-284
- Builder: Campbell Industries
- Completed: May 1940
- Acquired: 17 February 1942
- Commissioned: 23 February 1942
- Stricken: 16 April 1943
- Fate: Sunk, 25 October 1942 during a confrontation with Japanese destroyers

General characteristics
- Type: Patrol vessel
- Displacement: 469 tons
- Length: 131 ft 3 in (40.01 m)
- Beam: 29 ft 6 in (8.99 m)
- Draft: 15 ft (4.6 m)

USS YP-284 was a converted fishing vessel which served in the U.S. Navy during World War II. She was sunk in action with Japanese destroyers on 25 October 1942.

== World War II ==
The wooden hulled diesel-engine purse seiner fishing vessel Endeavor – completed in May 1940 at San Diego, Calif., was acquired by the U.S. Navy from Joe C. Mouise of San Diego under a bare-boat charter. Accepted by the Navy on 17 February 1942, the ship, designated as a district patrol vessel, YP-284, began undergoing conversion at the Campbell Machine Company. yard the same day. YP-284 was placed in service on 23 February 1942.

YP-284 cleared San Francisco, for the Panama Canal Zone on 5 March 1942. Pausing briefly at San Diego, she sailed from that port on the 9th, and arrived in isthmian waters on 25 March. Having been transferred to the Hawaiian Sea Frontier on 18 March, during her voyage southward, YP-284 set course northward, and returned to San Diego on 22 April, then sailed for the Hawaiian Islands on 6 May.

The former purse seiner arrived at Pearl Harbor at a momentous time, for Adm. Chester W. Nimitz, Commander in Chief, U.S. Pacific Fleet, apprised of an impending Japanese operation targeting Midway, was taking steps to meet the enemy. Among those plans was stationing district patrol vessels at various islets and islands in the Hawaiian chain, grouping four YPs into Task Force (TF) 4, assigned to the Hawaiian Sea Frontier. YP-284, along with YP-290, YP-345, and YP-350, set out from Pearl Harbor on at the close of the first dog watch [1800] on 20 May 1942. YP-284 reached Lisianski Island on the 27th, the day Adm. Nimitz promulgated Operation Plan No. 29-42, “to prevent the capture and occupation of Midway by enemy forces.” YP-290 went to Laysan Island, YP-345 to Gardner Pinnacles, and YP-350 to Necker Island, while the armed yacht Crystal (PY-25), took station at Pearl and Hermes Reef, the last-named ship arriving on 2 June 1942. The Battle of Midway occurred between 4 and 7 June, and resulted in the destruction of four of the Imperial Japanese Navy's carriers, all of its embarked air units, and a large percentage of trained maintenance people. YP-284 and her near-sisterships, meanwhile, patrolled their assigned areas and stood ready to assist downed aircraft, and eventually returned to Pearl, with YP-284 clearing Lisianski on 10 June. YP-290 sailed from Laysan the same day, YP-345 and YP-350 brought up the rear soon thereafter.

Transferred to the South Pacific Force on 23 July 1942, YP-284 sailed for Guadalcanal on 29 August 1942 in company with YP-239 and YP-346, with the destroyer Helm (DD-388) escorting the converted tuna clippers. The little group reached its destination without incident on 1 September.

== Fate ==
On 25 October 1942, the fleet tug Seminole (AT-65) departed Tulagi for Guadalcanal at 0510 with 500 drums of aviation gasoline on board, as well as four 75-millimeter howitzers and associated equipment, a portable derrick, and 75 marines under Capt. Wade H. Hitt, USMC, from Battery I, Third Battalion, Tenth Marines. The tug reached her unloading point about 3.5 miles east of Lunga Point at 0700.

YP-284, with Warrant Officer Christian Rasmussen in command, sailed from Tulagi at 0740 that day and set course for Guadalcanal with 46 marines, also from Battery I, Third Battalion, Tenth Marines, under Capt. William E. Boney, USMCR – who had only transferred from Battery H of the battalion six days earlier – on board as well as 28 drums of aviation gasoline, and 3,600 rounds of 75-millimeter ammunition. YP-284 reached her unloading point at 0940 and lay-to, awaiting tank lighters to come out from Guadalcanal to disembark her passengers and unload her cargo.

Seminole, interrupted once by an air raid alarm, managed to unload the howitzers and about 200 drums of aviation gasoline. A little over a half-hour later, however, at 1015, on board YP-284, WO Rasmussen received orders from Naval Operating Base (NOB) Cactus [Guadalcanal], to return to Tulagi with her passengers and cargo. Seminole received identical orders about that time.

At 1030, YP-284, her course set for Tulagi, sighted “three unknown vessels” headed for Guadalcanal from the direction of Savo Island. WO Rasmussen immediately radioed Tulagi, inquiring “if vessels were friendly.” Receiving a “negative,” the district patrol vessel also sighted the high-speed minesweepers Trever (DMS-16) and Zane (DMS-14) – misidentifying them as “destroyers” (an understandable error, however, given their having been destroyers prior to their conversion) – clearing Tulagi, standing to the east. The enemy ships, which proved to be the destroyers Akatsuki (Lt. Cmdr. Takasaku Osamu), Ikazuchi (Lt. Cmdr. Maeda Sanehu) and Shiratsuyu (Lt. Cmdr. Hashimoto Kanematsu) – soon took Trever and Zane under fire and increased speed to overtake the two minesweepers.

Meanwhile, WO Rasmussen had YP-284 increase speed, too, but doggedly maintained course for Tulagi “as,” he wrote later, “I figured that the Jap destroyers would keep up engagement with our destroyers.” The former tuna clipper's charmed life, however, did not last much longer, as the trio of Japanese warships “changed course to intercept YP-284 and Seminole…” Seeing the enemy alter course in his direction (1045), Rasmussen immediately steered for Guadalcanal. Five minutes later (1050), though, the enemy obtained the range.

The Japanese’ second 5-inch salvo crashed into YP-284’s starboard quarter, setting fire to the cargo; more salvoes struck in quick succession, with a direct hit on the engine room damaging the ammonia receivers and filling the ship with fumes. WO Rasmussen ordered the engines stopped as the doomed little ship came to a halt five miles from shore, and sailors and marines abandoned ship as the enemy continued to fire.

Soon thereafter, the Japanese shifted their full attention to Seminole, the majority of their shells passing through the vessel without exploding, others setting fire to her cargo, burning gasoline flowing down through the perforated decks. Seminole sounded “abandon ship” at 1120, going down 1,000 yards off Koli Point in about 20 fathoms. Miraculously, only one sailor died on board the tug.

Riddled and burning, YP-284, meanwhile, sank in about 270 fathoms of water approximately five miles east of Lunga Lagoon. BM1c Millard G. Ball, of the district patrol vessel's ship's company, was wounded, but, among the embarked marines, Pfc. LaVern D. Darling, USMCR, who had celebrated his 22nd birthday less than a month before, and Pvt. George A. McCartney, USMC, also 22, were slain.

== Aftermath ==
Tank lighters from Guadalcanal rescued YP-284's survivors – from the ship's complement and passengers – about mid-day. YP-284 was stricken from the Navy Register on 16 April 1943.

== Awards ==
YP-284 received one battle star for her World War II service, one of only eleven vessels of that class so honored.
