= USS YP-279 =

Coordinates: 19°12′07″S 146°53′10″E

History

United States
- Name: USS YP-279
- Builder: Campbell Machine Company, San Diego, California
- Launched: 1929
- Acquired: 1942
- Fate: Foundered, 5 September 1943

General characteristics
- Tonnage: 230 GRT
- Length: 125 ft (38 m)

USS YP-279 was a United States Navy district patrol craft during World War II.

The ship was built by the Campbell Machine Company of San Diego as a 125-foot (38 m) 230 GRT tuna seiner. Delivered in August 1929, she operated under the name Navigator until requisitioned by the United States Navy in 1942, and commissioned as the yard patrol craft USS YP-279.

The ship foundered in heavy weather off Townsville, Australia, on 5 September 1943.
