= USS Reedbird (AMc-30) =

Minesweeper of the United States Navy

History

United States
- Ordered: as Fearless
- Laid down: 1935
- Launched: 1935
- Acquired: 18 November 1940
- In service: 29 April 1941
- Out of service: 14 January 1946
- Stricken: 7 February 1946
- Fate: Submitted for disposal, 8 November 1946

General characteristics
- Displacement: 223 (full load)
- Length: 87 ft 5 in (26.64 m)
- Beam: 23 ft 10 in (7.26 m)
- Draught: 10 ft 3 in (3.12 m)
- Speed: 10.0 knots
- Complement: 12
- Armament: two .50 cal (12.7 mm) machine guns

USS Reedbird (AMc-30) was a Reedbird-class coastal minesweeper acquired by the U.S. Navy for the dangerous task of removing mines from minefields laid in the water to prevent ships from passing.

The first ship to be named Reedbird by the Navy was built in 1935 as the wooden purse-seiner Fearless by Al Larson, Terminal Island, California, was purchased by the Navy from Tony Marincovich and others 18 November 1940; renamed Reedbird (AMc-30), 30 December 1940; converted to a coastal minesweeper by the Campbell Machine Co., San Diego, California, and placed in service 29 April 1941. She was present at Pearl Harbor on December 7, 1941 (Attack on Pearl Harbor) and was undamaged.

== World War II service ==
Reedbird departed San Diego 14 May 1941 and, with USS Tippecanoe (AO-21), steamed west to Pearl Harbor. She reported for duty in the 14th Naval District 28 May and, equipped with acoustical, magnetic, and "O" type gear, operated in Hawaiian waters throughout World War II.

== Post-war deactivation ==
Then ordered inactivated, Reedbird returned to San Diego where she was stripped and placed out of service 14 January 1946. Her name was struck from the Navy list 7 February 1946 and on 8 November 1946 she was delivered to the Maritime Commission for disposal.
