= USS Bunting (AMc-7) =

Minesweeper of the United States Navy

History

United States
- Name: USS Bunting
- Launched: 1935, as SS Vagabond
- Acquired: 22 October 1940
- Commissioned: 6 June 1941
- Renamed: Bunting, 6 November 1940
- Stricken: 24 June 1942
- Fate: Sunk after collision, 3 June 1942

General characteristics
- Type: Coastal minesweeper
- Displacement: 115 long tons (117 t)
- Length: 79 ft 3 in (24.16 m)
- Beam: 21 ft 6 in (6.55 m)
- Draft: 9 ft 6 in (2.90 m)
- Speed: 8.5 knots (15.7 km/h; 9.8 mph)
- Complement: 16
- Armament: 2 × .30 cal (7.62 mm) machine guns

USS Bunting (AMc-7) was a coastal minesweeper in the United States Navy. She was named after the bunting, a seed-eating bird intermediate in size between starlings and finches.

== Acquisition and modification ==
SS Vagabond, a wooden-hulled purse seiner built in 1935 at Tacoma, Washington, by the Martinac Shipbuilding Co., was acquired by the Navy from Marko Bokich, et al., on 22 October 1940. She was designated AMc-7 shortly thereafter; renamed USS Bunting on 6 November 1940; converted to a coastal minesweeper by the Campbell Machine Company at San Diego, California. She was placed in service at the Destroyer Base, San Diego, on 6 June 1941.

== Assigned to San Francisco Bay duties ==
Assigned to the 12th Naval District, Bunting reported to her assigned base at the Section Headquarters, Treasure Island, San Francisco, California, on 19 June and spent the remainder of the year 1941 and the first five months of 1942 engaged in training officers, minesweeping, patrolling San Francisco Bay, and participating in local Army and Navy exercises.

== Collision and sinking ==
While patrolling from Line Mile Rock to Point Diablo, Bunting collided with the patrol craft PC-569 on 3 June 1942 and sank. Her name was struck from the Navy List on 24 June 1942.
