= D. Dudley Bloom =

American businessman (1922–2015)

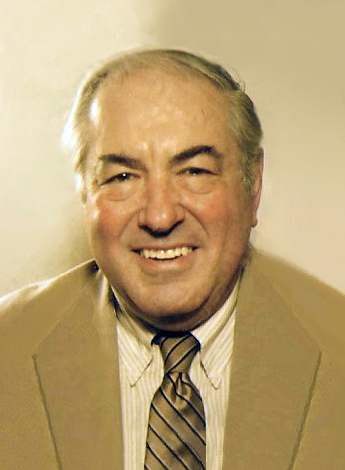
- D. Dudley Bloom in 1984
- Born: September 20, 1922
- Died: August 20, 2015 (aged 92)
- Education: Dickinson College; Dickinson School of Law

David Dudley Bloom (September 20, 1922 – August 20, 2015) was an American businessman who made notable contributions to the consumer products industry as a conceptual inventor and marketing executive during the 1950s and 1960s, including proposing and designing the first conventional travel luggage built on wheels; marketing the first "magic milk bottle" for dolls; and designing and marketing a continuous-play tape recorder.

== Early years ==
Dudley Bloom was raised in Chambersburg, Pennsylvania, son of Lithuanian immigrants Harry and Cecile Gaffin Bloom. His father was vice-president and sales manager of Bloom Brothers Department Stores in Franklin County, Pennsylvania, and his mother, raised in New York City, had been a bookkeeper for Macy's department stores there before her marriage. Bloom graduated from Dickinson College and Dickinson School of Law (now a division of Pennsylvania State University) in Carlisle, Pennsylvania, and during World War II was reputedly the youngest commanding officer in the United States Navy, having taken the helm of the supply ship USS Liberty (PY 278) in December 1944 during the New Guinea campaign at the age of 22.

== Reality-based toys ==
After clerking for Millard Ullman, a Waynesboro, Pennsylvania, lawyer, Bloom moved to Philadelphia, Pennsylvania, where he became assistant buyer of men's clothing at Lit Brothers's flagship department store at 701 Market Street. While working at Lit's, he met his future wife, Nancy Blum, and the couple married in June 1953.

Bloom then joined the New York City market research firm of A. J. Wood, Inc. Immersion in the then-new field of computerized mass marketing research at the Wood company prepared Bloom in the spring of 1954 to become director of product research and promotion at the American Metals Specialties Corporation (AMSCO), a then-struggling toy manufacturer located in Hatboro, Pennsylvania.

At AMSCO, Bloom expanded the company's line of reality-based toys that eschewed traditional military themes for boys and encouraged children of both genders to imitate constructive adult roles. "If we teach our children war and crime," he was quoted by Newsday in 1959, "we haven't much of a future to look forward to." He taught the industry that children learn how to be consumers long before they get their first jobs.

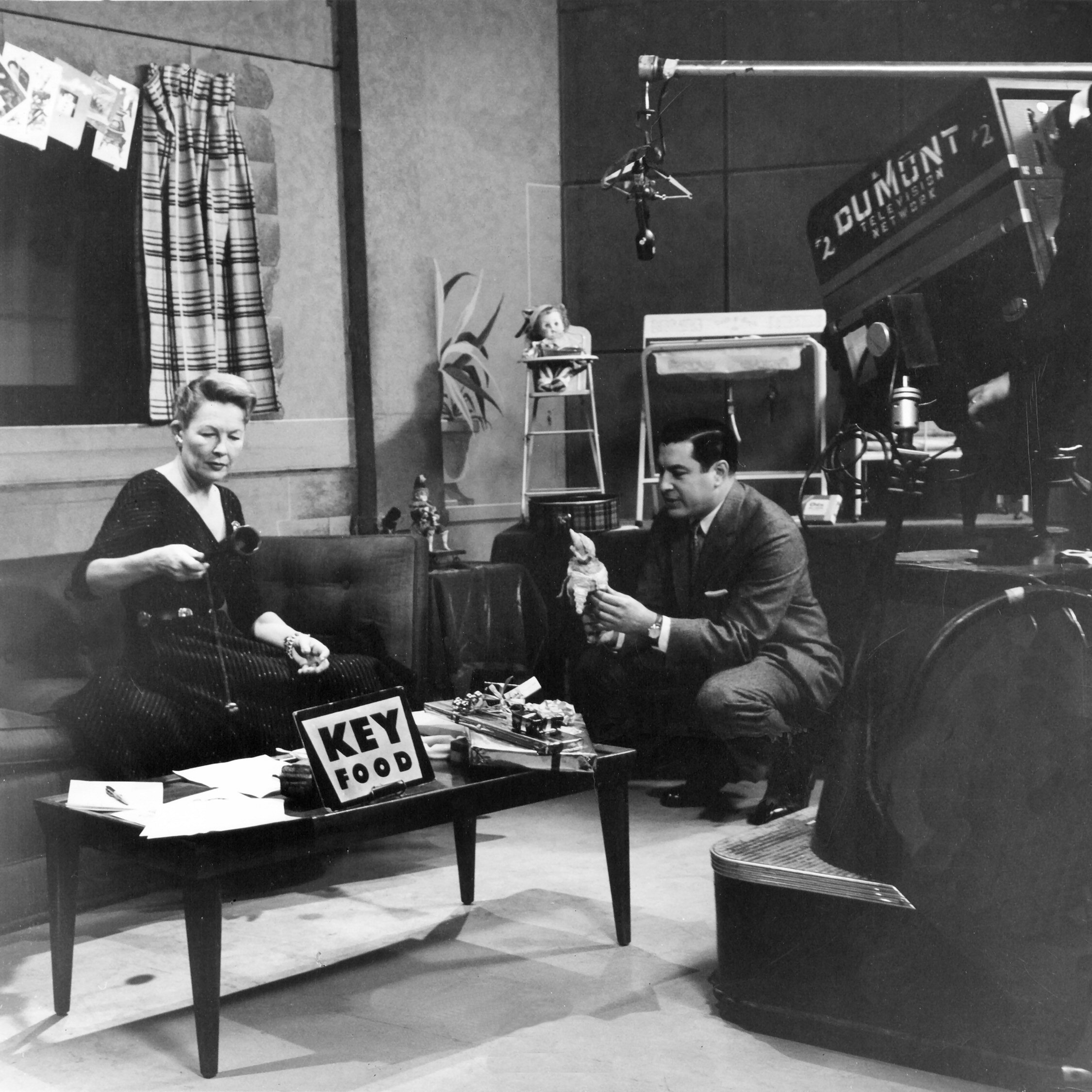
D. Dudley Bloom prepares TV host Wendy Barrie for an Amsco commercial spot on the Dumont Television Network, soon to be ABC, early in 1954.

The incorporation of common consumer products into Amsco reality-based play sets enabled children to imitate cooks with products manufactured by General Foods, Procter and Gamble, and Kellogg's; to feed dolls with Gerber's baby food and Pet Milk from a "magic bottle" that disappeared as Dollee "drank" it; and to care for those dolls with real Johnson and Johnson's baby shampoo, baby oil and baby powder. Children played doctor and nurse with toy stethoscopes and reflex hammers; playwright, actor, and stage director with magnetic puppet theaters; and astronaut with rockets and launching pads.

Soon, consumer product manufacturers were initiating reality-based campaigns of their own, such as General Foods for its AMSCO-manufactured Maxwell House Coffee-Time Set, which was advertised on children's television programs concurrently with the company's "Tastes as Good as it Smells" television advertising campaign for its brand of ground coffee, blurring the merchandising line between children's toys and their parents' groceries.

Bloom packaged virtually everything in see-through acetate rather than the paper to which the industry was accustomed.

== Luggage on wheels ==
In between stints at AMSCO (1954–57 and 1959–62), Bloom worked in marketing and product management at Atlantic Products Corporation (now Atlantic Luggage Company of Elwood City, Pennsylvania) in Trenton, New Jersey. Atlantic had been manufacturing the plaid hatboxes for Amsco's popular Betsy McCall Pretty Pac, a child-sized hatbox with an acetate insert that contained plastic grooming needs for dolls—one of the many "tie-ins" that resulted from cooperation between Amsco and other consumer product manufacturers. Atlantic offered Bloom, the Pretty Pac's product manager, the position of director of product development for its increasingly ubiquitous line of Scotch-plaid travel luggage, which became an icon of the 1950s.

In 1958, Bloom, who'd long suffered from back pain, proposed that Atlantic manufacture travel luggage that could be pulled on wheels through airports, bus terminals, and train stations, so he built a model—called in the trade a "mock-up"—of a suitcase attached to a platform with castors and a handle. The company's chairman scoffed at the idea, calling it "impractical". "Who'd want to buy luggage on wheels?" he asked. Although at Christmas, 1949, Bloomingdale's had sold a novelty device that attached to ordinary luggage and camp trunks had been manufactured on wheels since at least the 1880s, no company had ever manufactured rolling travel luggage. A different model of rolling luggage was finally developed in the early 1970s by Bernard D. Sadow, president of United States Luggage Corporation (now Briggs & Riley Travelware), after he had returned from a grueling business trip, and his company secured a patent for it on April 4, 1972. The market potential of his invention left unrecognized and untapped, Bloom soon left Atlantic to return to AMSCO. By the 1980s, virtually all luggage, including book bags for the world's billion schoolchildren, had wheels.

== The continuous-play tape recorder ==
After Amsco changed ownership in 1962, Bloom left the company a second time. With the help of Asian engineers, in early 1964 he began working on the design of a tape recorder that would play continuously—i.e., without rewinding—and founded International Audio Corporation in Philadelphia to market the device, mainly to department and specialty stores.

The recorder employed the same miniature reel-to-reel recording mechanism used since the 1940s by portable dictation machines. With his early training in retail marketing at Bloom Brothers, Bloom thought the machine would best be used to broadcast marketing messages to passing shoppers, with or without a mechanical or laser trigger, presaging today's public address systems, audio boxes linked to museum exhibits, and ultimately the audio cassette player that had been introduced by Philips in Europe in August 1963.

Though he'd had no training in electrical engineering, Bloom had spent time in Asia, having participated in the liberation of Japan in Papua New Guinea and the Philippines during World War II. Like his former commanding officer, Gen. Douglas MacArthur, he returned in April 1964 to discuss the tape recorder's design with Hong Kong engineers and oversee its manufacture by the Pioneer Electronics Corporation of Kobe, Japan. But when the finished recorders were delivered the following November, virtually none recorded as planned, their iron oxides having been damaged during storage and shipping.

Larger multinational electronics corporations would soon manufacture continuous-loop devices of their own, some of them employing reels, others cassettes; some of them dictation machines, others tape recorders. By the 1970s, the continuous-play-capable cassette tape recorder-player had become the predominant consumer audio technology, displacing vinyl records.

== Real estate and land development ==
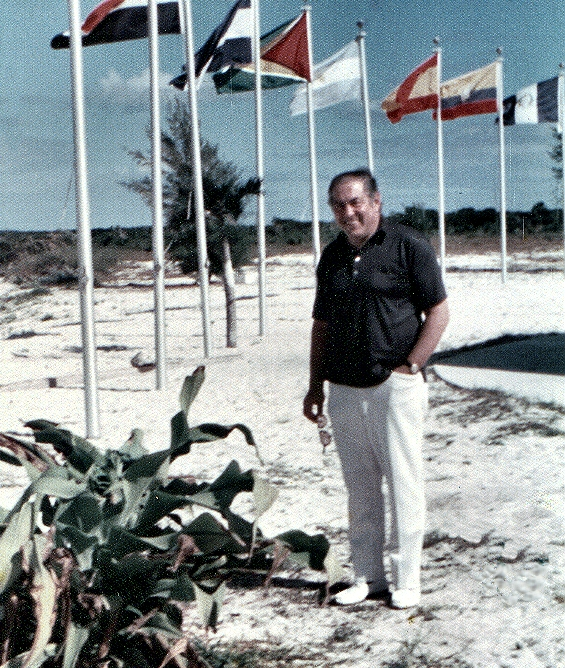
D. Dudley Bloom on Grand Bahama Island, 1968

Bloom retired from the consumer products industry in 1965 and in 1966, after having earned the highest score ever recorded on the Pennsylvania real estate brokers exam, spent the rest of his active business career as a residential and commercial real estate broker, representing developments such as Freeport/Lucaya on Grand Bahama Island and Palm Coast, Florida, a community built and marketed by ITT Community Development Corporation, builders of the Levittowns (formerly Levitt & Sons).

In 1970, he and his wife, Nancy, founded D. Dudley Bloom & Associates of Ardmore and, later, Wynnewood, Pennsylvania, and for the remainder of their careers, together marketed residential properties along Philadelphia's Main Line.

== Death ==
Early on the morning of August 20, 2015, D. Dudley Bloom died in his sleep, one month to the day short of his 93rd birthday, at Bryn Mawr (PA) Terrace Nursing and Rehabilitation Center, of chronic obstructive pulmonary disease and factors relating to diabetes mellitus. The following day, he was buried with full military honors at Roosevelt Memorial Park, Feasterville, Pennsylvania.
