= Masatomi Kimura =

Japanese admiral

- 木村 昌福
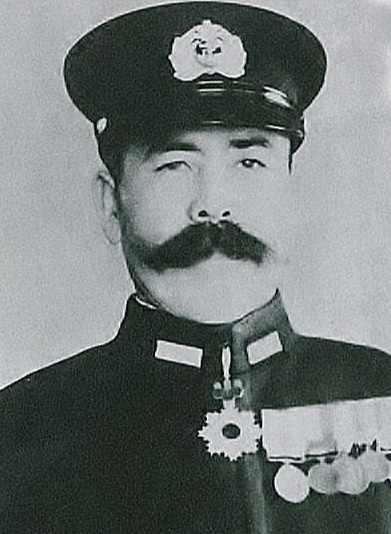
- Born: 6 December 1891; Shizuoka, Japan
- Died: 14 February 1960 (aged 68); Chiba, Japan
- Military career
- Allegiance: Empire of Japan
- Branch: Imperial Japanese Navy
- Service years: 1913–1945
- Rank: Vice Admiral
- Commands: Maki, Asanagi, Oite, Hagi, Hokaze, Katata, Atami, Asagiri, Destroyer Group 16, Destroyer Group 21, Destroyer Group 8 Kagu Maru, Shiretoko, Jintsu, Suzuya; 2nd Destroyer Squadron; 1st Destroyer Squadron; 3rd Destroyer Squadron
- Conflicts: World War II; Battle of the Bismarck Sea; Evacuation of Kiska; Battle of Leyte Gulf
- Awards: Order of the Sacred Treasure, 2nd Class; Order of the Rising Sun, 3rd Class
- Other work: Anti-Submarine Warfare School; Hofu Naval Communications School

Masatomi Kimura (木村 昌福, Kimura Masatomi; 6 December 1891 – 14 February 1960) was an admiral in the Imperial Japanese Navy during World War II.

== Biography ==
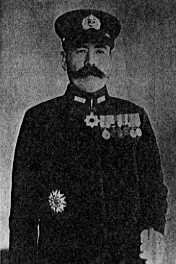
Image of Masatomi Kimura

Although born into the Kondō family of Shizuoka city Shizuoka Prefecture, Kimura was adopted by a family in Tottori city, Tottori prefecture soon after birth, and considered Tottori his official residence.

Kimura served his cadet duty on the Asama, making a cruise to Honolulu and to the west coast of the United States. Commissioned as a midshipman on 9 December 1913, he transferred to Yakumo on his return in 1914. After he was commissioned as an ensign on 1 December, he was assigned to the battleship Sagami and Suwo. After completing required coursework in torpedo warfare and naval artillery, he was posted to the South Pacific in the closing stages of World War I. On his return to Japan in 1918, he was posted to the Mikasa.

After his promotion to lieutenant in 1920, he commanded numerous torpedo boats and minesweepers. In 1926, after he was promoted to lieutenant commander, he was given command of the destroyer Maki. He subsequently captained the destroyers Asanagi, Oite, Hagi, Hokaze, river gunboats Katata, Atami, destroyer Asagiri, Destroyer Group 16, Destroyer Group 21, Destroyer Group 8, auxiliary seaplane tender Kagu Maru, auxiliary oiler Shiretoko, and cruisers Jintsu and Suzuya.

Kimura was captain of Suzuya during the attack on Pearl Harbor. He later assisted in the rescue of the crew of the Mikuma after that cruiser had been hit and sunk by American bombers during the Battle of Midway. On 1 November 1942, Kimura was promoted to Rear Admiral. He subsequently served in a number of staff positions, and was also commander of Desron3, with Shirayuki, Shikinami, Uranami, Tokitsukaze, Yukikaze, Asashio, Arashio, and Asagumo. He was assigned to escort eight transports with 6000 soldiers of the IJA 51st Division and 400 marines from Rabaul to Lae, New Guinea. In the Battle of the Bismarck Sea on 3–4 March 1943, US Navy and RAAF bombers inflicted severe damage on the Japanese convoy, sinking all of the transports and four destroyers. Admiral Kimura was wounded by machine gun fire in the shoulder and stomach, and his flagship, Shirayuki, was among the four destroyers sunk during the engagement.

After recovering from his injuries, Kimura, with an augmented DesRon 1, was assigned to cover the withdrawal of Japanese troops from Kiska Island in the Aleutians. When poor weather threatened the withdrawal operations, Kimura disobeyed orders and remained on station until the last man was recovered. Still in command of DesRon 1, Kimura sortied from Pescadores, Formosa on 22 October 1944 to join Vice Admiral Kiyohide Shima's Second Striking Force in the battle of Surigao strait, transferring his flag from Abukuma when she was disabled by a torpedo fired by Lieutenant (jg) Mike Kovar's PT-137. Afterward, in 1944, he was assigned to escort reinforcements to Leyte Island and Mindoro Island in the Philippines. In December 1944, Kimura led a raiding force of cruisers Ashigara, Ōyodo, and the destroyers Kasumi (flagship), Kiyoshimo, Asashimo, Kaya, Kashi, and Sugi from Cam Ranh Bay to bombard the American beachhead in Mindoro in the Philippines on the night of 26 December 1944. On 1 April 1945, Kimura became commandant of the Anti-submarine Warfare School, and the Hofu Naval Communications School. He was promoted to Vice Admiral on 1 November 1945, a few days before he entered the reserves on 10 November.

Kimura had a postwar career in the salt industry, and died of stomach cancer in 1960, aged 68.
