= USS YP-346 =

Yard patrol boat of the U.S. Navy

History

United States
- Name: Prospect
- Owner: Star & Crescent Boat Co.
- Port of registry: San Diego, California
- Builder: Campbell Industries, San Diego
- Launched: 1938
- Identification: Official number: 237063

United States
- Name: YP-346
- Operator: United States Navy
- Commissioned: 1942
- Honors and awards: Combat Action Ribbon; American Campaign Medal; Asiatic-Pacific Campaign Medal; World War II Victory Medal
- Fate: Shelled severely by Japanese light cruiser Sendai on 9 September 1942 and beached on Tulagi

General characteristics
- Type: Tuna clipper, Yard patrol boat
- Tonnage: 259 GRT
- Length: 108 ft (33 m)
- Beam: 26 ft (7.9 m)
- Draft: 10 ft (3.0 m)
- Installed power: 800 hp
- Propulsion: 2 x diesel engines
- Speed: 10 kn
- Armament: 3 x 20mm AA guns 2 x .50cal machine guns

USS YP-346 was a yard patrol boat in the U.S. Navy during World War II. The vessel began its career as the fishing vessel Prospect in 1938. Seized by the U.S. Navy in 1941 after the Attack on Pearl Harbor, it ferried supplies throughout the Pacific theater and was involved in the Guadalcanal campaign. The ship was destroyed by the Japanese light cruiser Sendai after its convoy was intercepted while returning to Tulagi harbor.

== Description ==
After the conversion to a yard patrol boat, YP-346 measured 259 gross register tons (GRT) and 133 net register tons (NRT). It had a length of 108 feet (33 m), a beam of 26 feet (7.9 m), and a draft of 10 feet (3.0 m). It had two diesel engines which spun two propellers with a combined power of 800 horsepower (600 kW), which gave it a maximum speed of 10 knots (19 km/h; 12 mph). It was armed with three 20 mm antiaircraft guns and two .50-caliber machine guns.

== History ==
=== Prospect ===
The ship was built as Prospect in 1938 by Campbell Industries in San Diego for the Star & Crescent Boat Company. It was given the identification code ON 237063 and began operations as a tuna clipper. By the time of the Japanese attack on Pearl Harbor in December 1941, Prospect was owned by Van Camp Sea Company and crewed entirely by Japanese Americans. Shortly after the United States entered the war, it was ordered to return to Point Loma, where the crew was detained and the vessel seized by the United States Navy.

=== YP-346 ===
Prospect was commissioned into the Navy as YP-346 in 1942. Joaquin Theodore, a tuna fisherman and master mariner, was designated as warrant officer in charge of the ship, despite a complete lack of military training. The rest of the crew was made up of men with a similar lack of military experience, but extensive maritime skill. YP-346 arrived at Pearl Harbor on 18 May 1942 and was stationed there briefly while awaiting orders. The ship then began ferrying supplies to remote islands in the western Pacific, while also trawling for tuna whenever possible. In addition to these duties, YP-346 was involved in various other tasks, including a period where it was attached as an escort for a seaplane tender.

On 3 August, the destroyer USS Tucker was escorting the freighter SS Nina Luckenbach into the Segond Channel. Unbeknownst to either ship, a dense minefield had been laid at the entrance of the channel earlier that day by several other American ships. Tucker quickly struck a mine and buckled in half, flooding rapidly. Nina Luckenbach was unable to move to assist Tucker due to fear of striking a mine itself. At the same time, YP-346 was transiting through the channel and responded to Tucker's request for aid. YP-346 was able to tow Tucker into water eight fathoms (48 ft; 15 m) deep before the ship began to jackknife and pull apart. YP-346 cut the lines connecting the two ships, leaving Tucker behind, and sailed to the beach of Malo Island in order to rescue a total of 165 survivors who had abandoned ship from the destroyer.

YP-346's next assignment was to Guadalcanal. Beginning on 10 August the ship moved cargo from Tulagi to Guadalcanal through the Ironbottom Sound. On 28 August, YP-346 brought a cargo of gasoline to the beachhead at Henderson Field, but had to anchor overnight due to a congestion of supply ships. At noon the next day, 24 Japanese bombers raided the beachhead, forcing YP-346 to raise anchor and withdraw from the island while still carrying several dozen drums of gasoline.

YP-346 continued running the route to Guadalcanal, but on 7 September it ferried a hundred Marine raiders instead of cargo. After distributing the entirety of the ship's food and cigarettes to the embarked Marines, YP-346 joined two other YP boats and three destroyers to make way for Guadalcanal. The raiders were unloaded near Tasimboko and returned to the ship that night after completing their mission. YP-346 then dropped them off at Henderson Field and prepared to return to Tulagi.

The convoy of three destroyers and three YP boats began the return trip after sundown. On the way, heavy rains and a difficult sea state meant that the YP boats were unable to keep up with the destroyers, which proceeded to steam ahead and leave the YP boats undefended. Around midnight, just as the lead ship YP-239 began pulling into Tulagi Harbor, the convoy was intercepted by the Japanese cruiser Sendai, and three Japanese destroyers. Sendai fired flares and opened fire on YP-346, but the small ship was so close and low to the water that the cruiser's 5-inch (130 mm) guns could not depress low enough to hit it. Instead, Sendai began firing its anti-aircraft guns at the YP boat. A round from one of the destroyers struck the stern of YP-346 and ignited a magazine store, and a few seconds later another hit destroyed the top of the pilothouse, causing several injuries and leading to the commanding officer to order the crew to abandon ship. Another shell hit the engine room, causing large amounts of ammonia gas to spew into the area. As the crew was putting on life vests, the commanding officer gave the order to attempt to beach YP-346. At some point, an electrician's mate was struck by shrapnel and fell overboard, becoming the only sailor killed-in-action in the engagement. After the vessel was beached, PFC John Murphy, who had also been struck by shrapnel, continued to assist other injured sailors onto life boats and then to the nearest aid station on the island. For his actions, he received the Navy Cross. The next day, Sendai entered the harbor and fired upon the beached (but by now fully abandoned) YP-346, completely destroying the craft.
