= Battle of the Pips =

1943 incident in World War II

The Battle of the Pips is the name given to an incident on 27 July 1943, part of the Aleutian campaign of World War II. In preparation for the amphibious assault on the island of Kiska planned for August 1943, the U.S. Navy formed Task Group 16.22 (TG 16.22)sa under the command of Rear Admiral Robert M. Griffin, centered on the battleships Mississippi and Idaho.

== Radar contact ==
On 27 July, 80 mi (70 nmi; 130 km) west of Kiska, TG 16.22 began to pick up seven unknown radar contacts. The order was given to open fire, and a total of 518 14-in (360-mm) shells were fired from the battleships, but there were no hits.

Radar was still a new and unreliable technology at that time, and weather conditions around the Aleutians were characteristically bad, with the very poor visibility normal for the area. No Japanese surface warships were actually within 200 mi (170 nmi; 320 km). There was speculation about the presence of Japanese submarines evacuating personnel from Kiska, or even Japanese submarines towing decoys to create dummy convoys. Ionized clouds and atmospheric reflexions of distant mountains from Amchitka or Semisopochnoi Island were also considered. Author Brian Garfield surmises, based on an analysis made in October 1991 by Aleutian crab fishing-boat captain George Fulton, that the pips were rafts of sooty or short-tailed shearwaters, species of migratory petrel that pass through the Aleutians in July every year.

== See also ==
- Fog of war
- Radar jamming and deception
