= JDS Isonami =

Ayanami-class destroyer

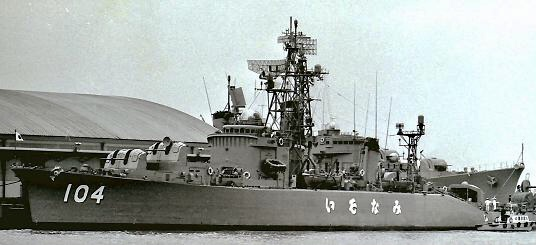
- JDS Isonami

History

Japan
- Name: Isonami; (いそなみ)
- Namesake: Isonami (1927)
- Ordered: 1955
- Builder: Mitsubishi, Kobe
- Laid down: 14 December 1956
- Launched: 30 September 1957
- Commissioned: 14 March 1958
- Decommissioned: 1 July 1987
- Reclassified: TV-3502
- Home port: Kure
- Identification: Pennant number: DD-104
- Fate: Sank as target, 1988

General characteristics
- Class & type: Ayanami-class destroyer
- Displacement: 1,720 t (1,690 long tons) standard; 2,500 t (2,500 long tons) full load
- Length: 109 m (358 ft)
- Beam: 10.7 m (35 ft)
- Depth: 8.1 m (26 ft 7 in)
- Complement: 220
- Armament: 6 × 3"/50 caliber Mk.22 guns; 4 × 533 mm (21 in) torpedo tubes; 2 × ASW torpedo racks; 2 × Hedgehog anti-submarine mortars; 2 × DCT (K-guns)

JDS Isonami (DD-104) was the second ship of Ayanami-class destroyers.

== Construction and career ==
Isonami was laid down at Mitsubishi Heavy Industries Kobe Shipyard on 14 December 1956 and launched on 30 September 1957. She was commissioned on 14 March 1958.

On 31 March 1958, she was transferred to the Yokosuka District Force 8th Escort Corps. On 25 October, the same year, the 8th Escort Corps was reorganized into the 1st Escort Corps group. During the special repair work from 1962 to 1963, the equipment was modernized, and the unequipped radio wave detector (ESM) NORL-1 was put in the back. Replaced equipment and search sonar with OQS-12 and attack sonar with OQY-2.

On 24 December 1964, she left Yokosuka for a trial run, and the bow of the Liberia-registered tanker Olympic Grace (37,000 tons) collided with the rear port side due to heavy fog and was damaged.

In March 1966, two depth charge projectors on the rear deck and two depth charge drop rails were removed, and equipped with variable depth sonar (VDS) OQA-1A.

In 1972, the short torpedo launcher was removed, and work was carried out to strengthen the anti-submarine attack capability with two 68-type triple short torpedo launchers.

On 13 June 1975, the 8th Escort Squadron was abolished and transferred to the 1st Training Squadron of the Training Squadron, and the home port was transferred to Kure.

In 1976, the ship was remodeled into a training ship with the escort ship registered, and the 4-unit long torpedo launcher was removed and a trainee auditorium was newly established.

On 30 March 1983, she was changed to a training ship and her registration number was changed to TV-3502.

She was removed from the register on 1 July 1987, along with her sister ship JDS Shikinami.

In 1988, she was prepared as a target ship at the Etajima Shipyard, and was sunk by anti-ship guided bullets.

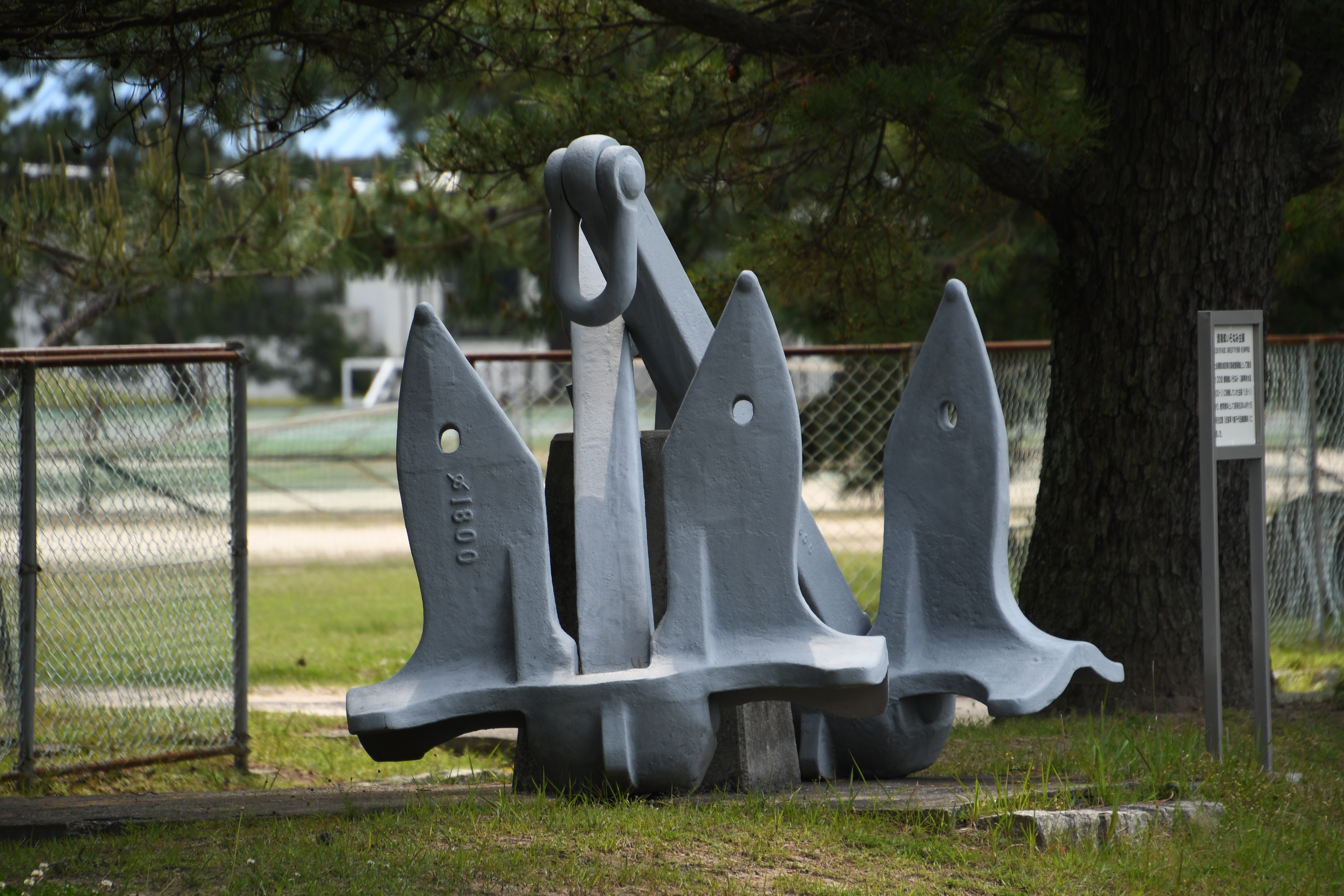
JDS Isonami's anchor
