= Japanese destroyer Shikinami (1929) =

Fubuki-class destroyer

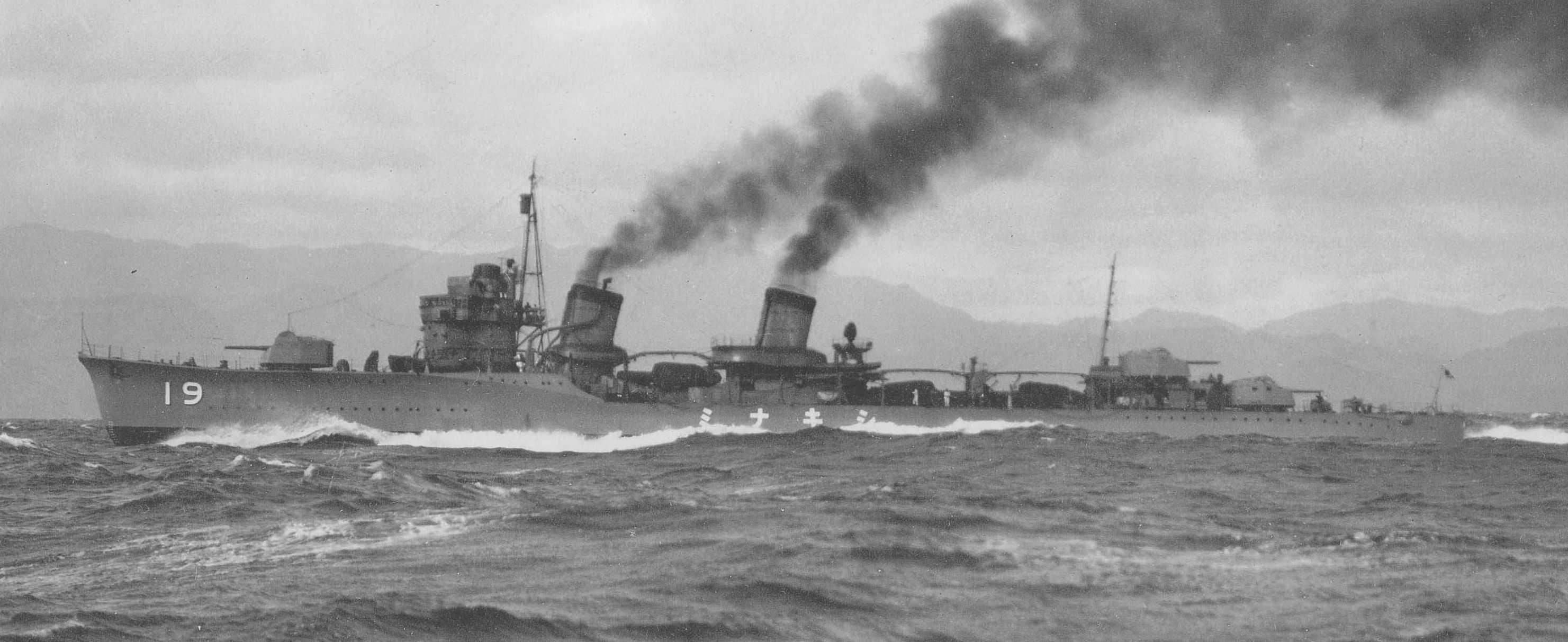
- Shikinami under way on 13 November 1929

History

Empire of Japan
- Name: Shikinami
- Namesake: 敷波 ("Spreading Waves")
- Ordered: 1923 Fiscal Year
- Builder: Maizuru Naval Arsenal
- Yard number: Destroyer No. 46
- Laid down: 6 July 1928
- Launched: 22 June 1929
- Commissioned: 24 December 1929
- Stricken: 10 October 1944
- Fate: Torpedoed and sunk, 12 September 1944

General characteristics
- Class & type: Fubuki-class destroyer
- Displacement: 1,750 long tons (1,780 t) standard; 2,050 long tons (2,080 t) re-built
- Length: 111.96 m (367.3 ft) pp; 115.3 m (378 ft) waterline; 118.41 m (388.5 ft) overall
- Beam: 10.4 m (34 ft 1 in)
- Draft: 3.2 m (10 ft 6 in)
- Propulsion: 4 × Kampon type boilers; 2 × Kampon Type Ro geared turbines; 2 × shafts at 50,000 ihp (37,000 kW)
- Speed: 38 knots (44 mph; 70 km/h)
- Range: 5,000 nmi (9,300 km) at 14 knots (26 km/h)
- Complement: 219
- Armament: 6 × Type 3 127 mm 50 caliber naval guns (3×2); up to 22 × Type 96 25 mm AT/AA guns; up to 10 × 13 mm AA guns; 9 × 610 mm (24 in) torpedo tubes; 36 × depth charges

Service record
- Operations: Second Sino-Japanese War; Battle of Malaya; Battle of Midway; Indian Ocean raid; Solomon Islands campaign
- Victories: USS Houston (1930); USS YP-346 (1941)

Shikinami (敷波, "Spreading Waves") was the 12th of 24 Fubuki-class destroyers, built for the Imperial Japanese Navy following World War I. When introduced into service, these ships were the most powerful destroyers in the world. They served as first-line destroyers through the 1930s, and remained formidable weapons systems well into the Pacific War.

Shikinami saw various escorting duties during the early parts of the war, then served in the battle of the Sunda Strait, where she launched a torpedo that finished off the already crippled heavy cruiser USS Houston. The Guadalcanal campaign saw more escorting duties, but mixed with troop and supply transport missions, several shore bombardment missions, and a gunfight in which she helped to sink the American patrol boat YP-346.

== History ==
Construction of the advanced Fubuki-class destroyers was authorized as part of the Imperial Japanese Navy's expansion program from fiscal 1923, intended to give Japan a qualitative edge with the world's most modern ships. The Fubuki class had performance that was a quantum leap over previous destroyer designs, so much so that they were designated Special Type destroyers (特型, Tokugata). The large size, powerful engines, high speed, large radius of action and unprecedented armament gave these destroyers the firepower similar to many light cruisers in other navies. Shikinami, built at the Maizuru Naval Arsenal was the second in an improved series, which incorporated a modified gun turret which could elevate her main battery of Type 3 127 mm 50 caliber naval guns to 75° as opposed to the original 40°, thus permitting the guns to be used as dual purpose guns against aircraft. Shikinami was laid down on 6 July 1928, launched on 22 June 1929 and commissioned on 24 December 1929. Originally assigned hull designation “Destroyer No. 46”, she was completed as Shikinami.

The 4th Fleet Incident occurred only a year after her commissioning, and Shikinami was quickly taken back to the shipyards to have her hull strengthened.

== Operational history ==
On completion, Shikinami, along with her sister ships, Uranami, Ayanami, and Isonami, were assigned to Destroyer Division 19 under the IJN 2nd Fleet. During the Second Sino-Japanese War in 1937, Shikinami covered landing of Japanese forces in Shanghai and Hangzhou. From 1940 on, she was assigned to patrol and cover landings of Japanese forces in south China.

=== World War II history ===
At the time of the attack on Pearl Harbor, Shikinami was assigned to Destroyer Division 19 of DesRon 3 of the IJN 1st Fleet, and had deployed from Kure Naval District to the port of Samah on Hainan Island, escorting Japanese troopships for landing operations in the Battle of Malaya at the end of 1941. In January–February 1942, Shikinami was assigned to the escort of the aircraft carrier Ryūjō as it conducted air strikes in the Java Sea.

On 1 March, Shikinami was on convoy escorting duty when she heard the word that another group of Japanese destroyers had run into the heavy cruiser USS Houston, the light cruiser HMAS Perth, and the destroyer HNLMS Evertsen, leading into the battle of the Sunda Strait (part of the overall battle of the Java Sea). Shikinami promptly joined the heavy cruisers Mogami and Mikuma in racing to partake in the engagement. Eventually, she made it to the clash while all three Allied ships were still afloat and attempted to charge the enemy but was fired on by Perth and was damaged by a near miss which bent her propeller.

As Shikinami turned back, she watched as Perth was hit by a torpedo from the destroyer Harukaze, then by three more torpedoes from the destroyers Murakumo and Shirakumo, sending the cruiser to the ocean floor. Simultaneously, Mogami and Mikuma opened fire and blasted Houston, hitting her with around 50 shell hits and at least two torpedoes, leaving the cruiser dead in the water without a single functioning surface gun, setting the cruiser on fire, and destroying all power. The lone Shikinami pounced on the crippled Houston, disabled and defenseless but still lashing out. The American sailors strafed Shikinami with machine gunfire, the cruiser's only remaining offensive capability, but she charged on and fired a single torpedo at the wounded prey. The torpedo ripped into Houston, serving as the coup de grâce as the abandon ship order was finally issued and Houston was left to sink by her crew. Shikinami regrouped with Mogami and Mikuma as in the final stages of the battle Murakumo and Shirakumo overpowered and sank the lone Eversten. Shikinami escorted troopship convoys from Saigon to Rangoon through the remainder of March. From 13 to 22 April, she returned via Singapore and Camranh Bay to Kure Naval Arsenal, for maintenance.

On 4–5 June, Shikinami participated in the Battle of Midway as part of Admiral Isoroku Yamamoto’s main fleet. Shikinami sailed from Amami-Ōshima to Mako Guard District, Singapore, Sabang and Mergui for a projected second Indian Ocean raid. The operation was cancelled due to the Guadalcanal campaign, and Shikinami was ordered to Truk instead, arriving in late August. During the Battle of the Eastern Solomons on 24 August, Shikinami escorted the fleet supply group to Guadalcanal. She was assigned to numerous "Tokyo Express" transport missions to various locations in the Solomon Islands in October and November.

Shikinami also saw combat several times off Guadalcanal, starting on 6 September when she was tasked with intercepting an American troop convoy, but instead regrouped and helped to bombard the American airbase Henderson Field alongside the destroyers Ariake, Uranami, and Yūdachi. Three days later, Shikinami was tasked with another bombardment of Henderson Field alongside the light cruiser Sendai and the destroyers Fubuki and Suzukaze, but underway ran into the American patrol boat YP-346. The range was so close that their gun batteries could not engage, but YP-346 was small enough to be critically damaged by machine gunfire. Together, the four ships opened up anti-aircraft guns, hit after hit destroyed her engine, raked her superstructure, and igniting her magazine storage, setting fire to the patrol boat flooding her with water. YP-346 was beached and abandoned by her crew, and the hulk was blasted apart by surface gunfire. The four ships stuck around for shore bombardment on Tulagi but aborted the attack on their intended target. Three more days later, Sendai, Fubuki, Shikinami, and Suzukaze departed on another shore bombardment mission, shelling the beaches of Guadalcanal to support the battle of Edson's Ridge.

During the Second Naval Battle of Guadalcanal on 14–15 November 1942 Shikinami was attached to a scouting force under the command of Rear Admiral Shintarō Hashimoto in the light cruiser Sendai. Shikinami survived the battle without damage, and returned to Kure by the end of the year.

In January 1943, Shikinami escorted a troop convoy from Pusan to Palau and on to Wewak. For the remainder of January–February, she patrolled out of Truk or Rabaul. On 25 February, Shikinami was reassigned to the IJN 8th Fleet.

During the Battle of the Bismarck Sea on 1–4 March, Shikinami escorted a troop convoy from Rabaul to Lae. She survived the Allied air attack on 3 March which sank her sister ship Shirayuki, and rescued Rear Admiral Masatomi Kimura and other survivors. After returning to Kure briefly in March, Shikinami continued to serve in an escort and transport role in the Solomon Islands and New Guinea area through the end of October 1943. At the end of October 1943, Shikinami was refit in Singapore, and assigned to escort of transports between Singapore and Surabaya and Balikpapan for the remainder of the year.

At the end of January 1944, Shikinami escorted the cruisers Aoba, Ōi, Kinu, and Kitakami on a resupply run to the Andaman Islands, and towed the torpedoed Kitakami back to Singapore afterwards. In a month-long refit in Singapore from mid-March to mid-April, additional anti-aircraft guns were fitted. In May–June, Shikinami made numerous escort missions between Singapore, the Philippines and Palau. During a troop transport mission to Biak as flagship for Admiral Naomasa Sakonju, Shikinami came under a strafing air attack, which set fire to her depth charges, which were jettisoned just before they exploded, killing two crewmen and wounding four others. Shikinami continued to escort ships between Singapore, Brunei and the Philippines from June to August, rescuing the survivors of the torpedoed Ōi on 19 July. On 12 September, after departing Singapore with a convoy bound for Japan, Shikinami was torpedoed by the submarine USS Growler 240 nmi (440 km; 280 mi) south of Hong Kong at position 18°16′N 114°40′E. Eight officers and 120 men were rescued by the destroyer Mikura, but her captain—Lieutenant Commander Takahashi—and Rear Admiral Sadamichi Kajioka were killed in action.

On 10 October 1944, Shikinami was removed from the navy list.
