= Campbell Industries =

Shipyard in San Diego, California, United States

Coordinates: 32.705664°N 117.16358°W

Campbell Industries or Campbell Machine Company was a shipbuilding company in San Diego, California, most construction was Fishing boats. To support the World War II demand for ships Campbell Industries shipyard switched over to military construction and built: US Navy minesweepers. Campbell Industries was started in 1906 as the Campbell Machine Company as builder and repair yard for tuna seiners. Campbell Machine Company went public in 1960 and was renamed to Campbell Industries. In 1979 the yard was sold again to Marco. In 1982 Marco sold the yard to San Diego Marine Industries, Inc. (not the well known San Diego Marine Construction, Inc.). San Diego Marine Industries, Inc. later became Southwest Marine in 1985. The shipyard closed in 1991 and was later sold, part of the land became the San Diego Convention Center. The shipyard was located at 1206 Marina Park Way, San Diego, in San Diego Bay near Embarcadero Marina Park South in the Port of San Diego.

== YMS-1-class minesweeper ==
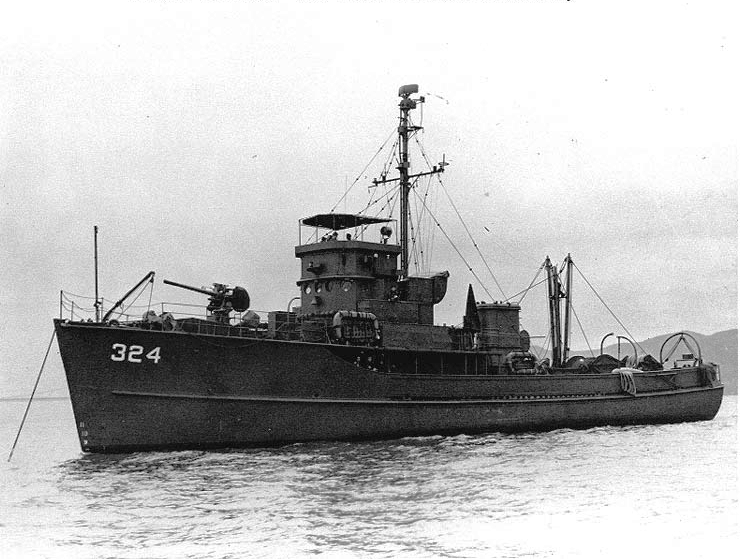
YMS-1-class minesweeper

Campbell Industries built YMS-1-class minesweepers for the United States Navy in 1942 and 1943. The ships had a displacement of 270 tons, a length of 136 ft 0 in (41.45 m), a beam of 24 ft 6 in (7.47 m), a draft of 10 ft (3.0 m), and a top speed of 15 knots (28 km/h; 17 mph). The ships had a crew of 32. The vessels were armed with one 40 mm gun. Twin sister ship see: USS Bobolink (AMS-2)

Hull #	Original Name	Original Owner	Ship Type	GT	Delivered	Notes
71	YMS 151	US Navy	Minesweeper	278	5-Oct-43	Caught in typhoon off Okinawa and lost in 1945
72	YMS 152	US Navy	Minesweeper	278	26-Nov-43	To Britain 1943 as BYMS 2152, to Greece 1946 as Kleio
73	YMS 153	US Navy	Minesweeper	278	23-Nov-43	To Britain 1943 as BYMS 2153
74	YMS 154	US Navy	Minesweeper	278	1-Jan-44	To Britain 1943 as BYMS 2154

== Notable ships ==
Notable ships:

- USS YP-279 converted fishing vessel, district patrol craft during World War II.
- USS YP-278 converted fishing vessel. Use as reefer food supplies shipments in the Pacific theater during World War II.
- USS YP-284 converted fishing vessel. Sank in action by Japanese destroyers on 25 October 1942.
- USS YP-290 converted fishing vessel, district patrol craft during World War II.
- Campbell Industries converted some fish boats to US Navy minesweepers like the USS Bunting (AMc-7) and USS Reedbird (AMc-30) in 1941
- YP-292 District Patrol Craft, 1937, built as Tuna clipper Azoreana
- Constitution Service, Pioneer Service, Liberty Service, Freedom Service and Independence Service Tugs for Zapata Marine Service Inc. Both 208-feet a beam of 40 feet and a draft of 14.5 feet, top speed 15 knots with 5,750 hp. Independence Service sank in 30 feet of water on the west side of Puerto Rico and became a total loss, she was raised and scrapped.
- Tuna superseiners 18 ships one Marjorie R, 218 feet long, a beam of 40-feet, up to 1,200 tons frozen fish payload, top speed 17 knots.

== See also ==
- California during World War II
- Maritime history of California
- Union Iron Works
- Richmond Shipyards
- Kneass Boat Works
- Pacific Bridge Company
