= Japanese submarine I-121 =

Imperial Japanese Navy I-121-class submarine

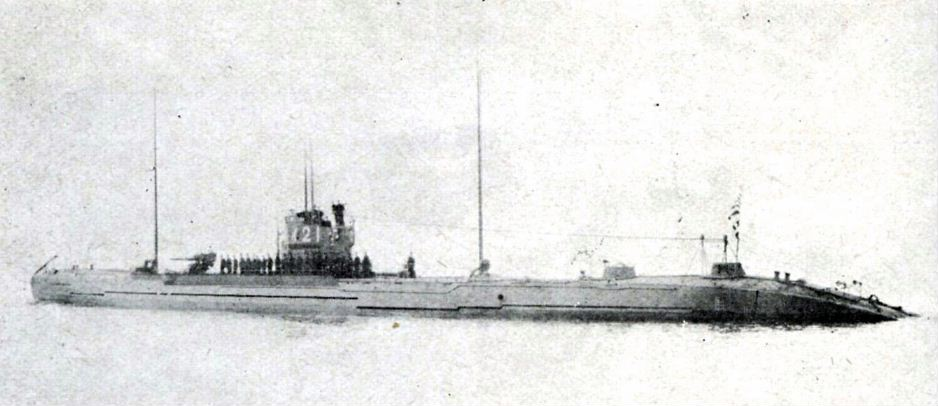
- I-21 at Kobe, Japan, on her commissioning day, 31 March 1927.

History

Imperial Japanese Navy
- Name: Submarine No. 48
- Builder: Kawasaki Corporation, Kobe, Japan
- Laid down: 20 October 1924
- Renamed: I-21 1 November 1924
- Launched: 30 March 1926
- Completed: 31 March 1927
- Commissioned: 31 March 1927
- Decommissioned: 15 March 1933
- Recommissioned: 15 November 1933
- Decommissioned: 15 November 1935
- Recommissioned: 20 March 1937
- Renamed: I-121 1 June 1938
- Stricken: 30 November 1945
- Fate: Surrendered September 1945; Scuttled 30 April 1946

General characteristics
- Class & type: I-121-class submarine
- Displacement: 1,142 long tons (1,160 t) surfaced; 1,768 long tons (1,796 t) submerged
- Length: 85.20 m (279 ft 6 in) overall
- Beam: 7.52 m (24 ft 8 in)
- Draft: 4.42 m (14 ft 6 in)
- Propulsion: 2 × Rauschenbach Mk.1 diesels; 2,400 bhp surfaced; 1,100 shp submerged; 2 shafts
- Speed: 14.9 knots (27.6 km/h; 17.1 mph) surfaced; 6.5 knots (12.0 km/h; 7.5 mph) submerged
- Range: 10,500 nmi (19,400 km; 12,100 mi) at 8 knots (15 km/h; 9.2 mph) surfaced; 40 nmi (74 km; 46 mi) at 4.5 knots (8.3 km/h; 5.2 mph) submerged
- Test depth: 75 m (246 ft) (as built); 55 m (180 ft) (1936)
- Complement: 80
- Armament: 2 × 533 mm (21 in) torpedo tubes; 12 × 6th Year Type torpedoes; 1 × 14 cm/40 11th Year Type naval gun; 42 × naval mines

I-121, laid down in 1924 as Submarine No. 48 and known as I-21 from November 1924 to June 1938, was an I-121-class submarine of the Imperial Japanese Navy that served during the Second Sino-Japanese War and World War II. During the latter conflict, she conducted operations in support of the Japanese invasion of Malaya, the Japanese invasion of the Philippines, the bombing of Darwin, the Battle of Midway, the Guadalcanal campaign, the Battle of the Eastern Solomons, and the New Guinea campaign. She surrendered at the end of the war in 1945 and was scuttled in 1946.

After she was renumbered I-121 in 1938, the number I-21 was assigned to a later submarine which also served during World War II.

== Design ==
I-121 and her three sister ships — I-22 (later renumbered I-122), I-23 (later renumbered I-123), and I-24 (later renumbered I-124) — were the Imperial Japanese Navy's only submarine minelayers. They were known in Japan by the type name Kirai Fusetsu Sensuikan (機雷敷設潜水艦, minelaying submarine), commonly shortened to "Kiraisen"-type submarine (機雷潜型潜水艦, Kiraisen-gata sensuikan).

The Kiraisen-type design was based on that of the Imperial German Navy minelaying submarine SM UB-125, a Type UB III submarine which was the largest of seven German submarines transferred to Japan as a war reparation after World War I and served in the Imperial Japanese Navy as O-6 from 1920 to 1921. Like UB-125, the Kiraisen-type submarines had two diesel engines producing a combined 2,400 horsepower (1,790 kW), could carry 42 mines, and had four torpedo tubes and a single deck gun — a 5.5-inch (140 mm) gun on the Japanese submarines in contrast to a 5.9-inch (150 mm) gun on UB-125. Compared to the German submarine, they were larger — 10 feet (3 m) longer, and displacing 220 more tons on the surface and 300 more tons submerged — and had a longer range both on the surface — 970 nautical miles (1,800 km; 1,120 mi) farther at 8 knots (15 km/h; 9.2 mph) — and submerged — 5 nautical miles (9.3 km; 5.8 mi) farther at 4.5 knots (8.3 km/h; 5.2 mph). They were 0.2 knots (0.37 km/h; 0.23 mph) slower than UB-125 both surfaced and submerged, carried two fewer torpedoes, and could dive to only 200 feet (61 m) compared to 250 feet (76 m) for UB-125.

== Construction and commissioning ==
Built by Kawasaki at Kobe, Japan, I-121 was laid down on 20 October 1924 with the name Submarine No. 48. While she was on the building ways, she was renamed I-21 on 1 November 1924. She was launched on 30 March 1926 and was completed and commissioned on 31 March 1927.

== Service history ==
=== 1927–1937 ===
Upon commissioning, I-21 was assigned to either the Kure Naval District or the Yokosuka Naval District, according to different sources. On 1 November 1927, she was assigned to Submarine Division 9 in the Yokosuka Defense Division in the Yokosuka Naval District. On 9 March 1928 she was conducting speed trials off Yokosuka Bay when she collided with the destroyer Shiokaze, which was underway to conduct torpedo launch trials. There were no casualties aboard either ship, but both vessels suffered light damage. I-21′s bow was bent 60 degrees to starboard. She proceeded to Yokosuka, where she underwent repairs.

I-21′s tour of duty in Submarine Division 9 came to an end on 1 December 1930, when she was assigned directly to the Kure Naval District. She was reassigned to Submarine Division 13 in the Kure Naval District on 15 October 1931, and on 1 October 1932 her division became part of the Kure Defense Division in the district.

On 15 March 1933, I-21 was decommissioned and placed in reserve. On 15 November 1933, Submarine Division 13's assignment to the Kure Defense Division ended and it was reassigned directly to the Kure Naval District, and that day I-21 was recommissioned and returned to active service in the division. After her sister ship I-24 suffered damage to her main ballast tanks while I-23 and I-24 were conducting deep diving trials on 25 May 1935, Submarine Division 13 was assigned to the Kure Defense Squadron in the Kure Naval District on 15 November 1935, and that day I-21 was decommissioned so that her main ballast tanks could be reinforced. In 1936 all four submarines of her class had their designed diving depth limited to 180 feet (55 m). With the ballast tank work completed, I-21 was recommissioned on 20 March 1937.

=== Second Sino-Japanese War ===
On 7 July 1937 the first day of the Marco Polo Bridge Incident took place, beginning the Second Sino-Japanese War. In September 1937, Submarine Division 13, consisting of I-21 and her sister ship I-22, moved to a base at Qingdao, China, and began operations in northern Chinese waters as part of a Japanese blockade of China. On 1 December 1937, Submarine Division 13 was assigned to Submarine Squadron 3 in the 4th Fleet, a component of the Combined Fleet, and in December 1937 the light cruiser Kuma arrived at Qingdao to serve as flagship of Submarine Squadron 3, which consisted of I-21, I-22, I-23, and I-24.

I-21 and I-22 received orders to provide distant cover for Kuma while she put a Special Naval Landing Force (SNLF) unit ashore off Chefoo, China, on 3 February 1938, but both submarines experienced engine trouble that prevented them from getting underway to support Kuma. The two submarines had greater success on 22 March 1938, when they departed Port Arthur, Manchukuo, and each of them landed 15 Shanghai-based SNLF troops on Liukung Island in Weihai Bay before they returned to Port Arthur.

I-21 was renumbered I-121 on 1 June 1938, freeing up her previous number for the new submarine I-21, whose keel was laid that year. On 20 June 1938, I-121 was placed in the Second Reserve in the Kure Naval District. In an effort to reduce international tensions over the conflict in China, Japan withdrew its submarines from Chinese waters in December 1938.

=== 1938–1941 ===
While in reserve, I-121 and all three of her sister ships — which, like her, had been renumbered on 1 June 1938, I-22 becoming I-122, I-23 becoming I-123, and I-24 becoming I-124 — underwent conversion into submarine tankers. Retaining their minelaying and torpedo capabilities, they were modified so that each of them could carry 15 tons of aviation gasoline with which to refuel flying boats, allowing the flying boats to extend their range during reconnaissance and bombing missions by meeting the submarines in harbors and lagoons for more fuel.

On 1 May 1940, I-121 returned to active service in Submarine Division 13, which was assigned that day to Submarine Squadron 5 in the 4th Fleet. She soon began a lengthy training cruise in the Pacific in company with I-121, I-123, and I-124: The four submarines departed Sasebo, Japan, on 16 May 1940 and visited the waters of the Caroline Islands, Marshall Islands, and Mariana Islands before concluding their cruise with their arrival at Yokosuka, Japan, on 22 September 1940. On 11 October 1940, I-121 was one of 98 Imperial Japanese Navy ships that gathered along with more than 500 aircraft on the Japanese coast at Yokohama Bay for an Imperial fleet review — the largest fleet review in Japanese history — in honor of the 2,600th anniversary of the enthronement of the Emperor Jimmu, Japan's legendary first emperor.

Submarine Division 13 was reassigned directly to the Kure Naval District on 15 November 1940, and from 30 January to 4 February 1941, I-121 temporarily substituted for I-122 as flagship of the division. On 1 May 1941, Submarine Division 13 was assigned to Submarine Squadron 6 in the 3rd Fleet, a component of the Combined Fleet.

As the Imperial Japanese Navy began to deploy in preparation for the impending conflict in the Pacific, I-121 departed Yokosuka in November 1941 bound for Samah on Hainan Island in China. She arrived at Samah on 27 November 1941. On 1 December 1941, she departed Samah to begin what would become her first war patrol. She received the message "Climb Mount Niitaka 1208" (Japanese: Niitakayama nobore 1208) from the Combined Fleet on 2 December 1941, indicating that war with the Allies would commence on 8 December 1941 Japan time (7 December 1941 on the other side of the International Date Line in Hawaii, where the war would begin with Japan's attack on Pearl Harbor). On 7 December 1941, the last day in East Asia before the attack, I-121 laid forty-two Type 88 Mark 1 mines northeast of Singapore in the vicinity of 00°40′N 115°00′E. She then took up her patrol station off the eastern entrance of Johore Strait.

=== World War II ===
==== First war patrol ====
In East Asia, the Pacific campaign of World War II began on 8 December 1941, and Japanese forces invaded British Malaya to the north of Singapore that day. Reassigned to the Southern Submarine Force, I-121 called at Cam Ranh Bay in Japanese-occupied French Indochina on 12 December 1941, then got back underway either later the same day or on 18 December 1941 (according to different sources) to support the Japanese invasion of the Philippines, bound for the vicinity of Davao on Mindanao. Patrolling in the Sulu Sea, she supported the Japanese landings at Davao on 19–20 December 1941 and at Jolo on 24 December 1941. Reassigned to Submarine Group "A" along with I-122, I-123, and I-124 on 26 December 1941, she concluded her patrol on either 27 or 31 December 1941 (according to different sources) with her arrival at newly captured Davao.

==== Second war patrol ====
On 5 January 1942, I-121 set out from Davao to begin her second war patrol, tasked with laying mines at the entrance to Port Darwin, Australia, which the United States Asiatic Fleet had made its main logistics base after retreating from its bases in the Philippines. At 05:30 on 11 January 1942, she unsuccessfully attacked an unidentified Allied destroyer in the Timor Sea off the coast of Australia's Northern Territory southwest of the Tiwi Islands. By 04:55 on 12 January 1942, she had laid 39 mines in the Clarence Strait between Melville Island and the mainland of Australia, after which she returned to her patrol area in the Timor Sea. She pursued an unidentified Allied merchant ship escorted by a patrol vessel in the Timor Sea west of Wetar on 18 January 1942 and fired three torpedoes at it. She then returned to the Clarence Strait, where on 21 January 1942 three Allied patrol vessels attacked her, dropped 42 depth charges, and damaged two of her fuel tanks.

Not knowing that Royal Australian Navy ships had sunk I-124 on 20 January 1942, I-121 departed her patrol area on 25 January 1942 to rendezvous with I-124. She reached the rendezvous point on 28 January 1942 at 04:00 and loitered in the area until 23:00 awaiting I-124. When I-124 failed to arrive, I-121 set a course for Davao, where she and I-122 arrived on 30 January 1942. At Davao, she took on fuel, ammunition, and supplies from the submarine tender Chōgei and had her damaged fuel tanks repaired.

==== Third war patrol ====
In company with I-122, I-121 departed Davao on 9 February 1942 to begin her third war patrol, with a primary mission of supporting an impending air attack on Port Darwin by planes from the aircraft carriers of Vice Admiral Chuichi Nagumo′s Mobile Force and land-based aircraft from both Ambon and Kendari, Celebes. Her specific tasks included a reconnaissance of Port Darwin prior to the attack and the transmission from the Arafura Sea off northern Australia of weather reports to Nagumo's ships, which would be approaching from Palau. After patrolling 300 nautical miles (560 km; 350 mi) northeast of Morotai, she parted company with I-122 — which independently headed southeast — on 13 February 1942 and proceeded south on her own. By sunset on 16 February 1942, I-121 had reached her patrol area 50 nautical miles (93 km; 58 mi) northwest of Darwin, Australia.

On 18 February 1942, I-121 surfaced before sunset to recharge her batteries, but had to crash-dive when an Australian patrol plane strafed her. After dark, she surfaced again to finish recharging her batteries, and at 20:30 sent a weather report to Nagumo's ships, which were underway from Palau. She sent Nagumo another weather report at 02:30 on 19 February 1942. At 09:57 that morning, 188 aircraft from Nagumo's carriers began an attack on Darwin's harbor, airfields, and urban center, followed by a raid by 55 Japanese land-based bombers. The attack sank eight ships, damaged nine ships, destroyed 15 aircraft, and damaged structures in the city itself.

I-121 departed her patrol station on 25 February 1942 and proceeded to Staring Bay on the Southeast Peninsula of Celebes just southeast of Kendari, where she concluded her patrol with a rendezvous with Chōgei, which had moved there from Davao. After replenishing and refueling, I-121 departed Staring Bay in company with I-122 on 10 March 1942 — the same day they were subordinated directly to the headquarters of the Combined Fleet — and headed for Japan. They arrived at Kure on 21 March 1942 to undergo repairs. While they were there, Submarine Squadron Six was disbanded on 10 April 1942, and their division — Submarine Division 13 — was subordinated directly to the 6th Fleet.

==== Midway operation ====
With her repairs completed, I-121 departed Kure bound for Kwajalein on 8 May 1942, deploying to participate in Operation MI, the planned Japanese invasion of Midway Atoll. She stopped at Kwajalein from 19 to 21 May 1942, when she got underway to support a preliminary phase of the Midway operation, Operation K-2, which called for I-121 and I-123 to refuel two Kawanishi H8K (Allied reporting name "Emily") flying boats at the French Frigate Shoals in the Northwest Hawaiian Islands so that the two aircraft could conduct a reconnaissance flight over Pearl Harbor, while I-122 patrolled south of Pearl Harbor to rescue the crews of the aircraft if they were shot down and the submarine I-171 operated east of the French Frigate Shoals to provide a radio beacon for the planes. When I-123 arrived off the French Frigate Shoals in late May 1942, however, she found the U.S. Navy seaplane tenders USS Ballard (AVD-10) and USS Thornton (AVD-11) already operating flying boats there, and Operation K-2 was cancelled.

I-121 received I-123′s report of the U.S. activity at French Frigate Shoals on 30 May 1942. She was informed of the cancellation of Operation K-2 on 31 May 1942, and that day was ordered to continue to patrol in the vicinity of the French Frigate Shoals. The Battle of Midway began on 4 June 1942, and that day I-121 and I-123 were ordered to move westward to new patrol areas. While southwest of Lisianski Island en route to her new patrol area on 5 June 1942, I-121 sighted the submarine USS Dolphin (SS-169) heading northeast on the surface. At 14:59 local time Dolphin sighted I-121′s periscope 2,000 yards (1,830 m) dead astern of her and moved out of range before I-121 could achieve a firing solution against her.

The Battle of Midway ended on 7 June 1942 in a decisive Japanese defeat, and the Japanese cancelled the invasion of Midway. I-121 concluded her patrol with her arrival at Kwajalein in company with I-122 and I-123 on 25 June 1942. She later returned to Japan, arriving at Yokosuka.

==== Guadalcanal campaign ====
Toward the end of I-121′s stay at Yokosuka, Submarine Division 13 was resubordinated to Submarine Squadron 7 in the 8th Fleet on 14 July 1942. On 16 July 1942, she departed Yokosuka to take up her new duties, calling at Truk from 24 to 31 July 1942 and arriving at Rabaul on New Britain on 4 August 1942.

While I-121 was at Rabaul, the Guadalcanal campaign began on 7 August 1942 with U.S. amphibious landings on Guadalcanal, Tulagi, Florida Island, Gavutu, and Tanambogo in the southeastern Solomon Islands. I-121 and I-122 put to sea that day from Rabaul to conduct a reconnaissance in the waters off Guadalcanal and Tulagi. The U.S. submarine USS S-38 (SS-143) sighted I-121 on the surface 30 nautical miles (56 km; 35 mi) south of Cape St. George on New Ireland on 8 August 1942 but was unable to attack her. From 15 to 17 August 1942, I-121 reconnoitered Lungga Roads off Guadalcanal. On 18 August 1942 she moved to a new patrol area southeast of San Cristobal. and her squadron, Submarine Squadron 13, was resubordinated to the Advance Force on 21 August 1942. In her new patrol area, I-121 unsuccessfully attacked U.S. Navy Task Force 16 50 nautical miles (93 km; 58 mi) southeast of San Cristobal on 22 August 1941. One of her torpedoes broached briefly as it passed between the aircraft carrier USS Enterprise (CV-6) and the heavy cruiser USS Portland (CA-33).

On 24–25 August 1942, Task Force 16 fought in the Battle of the Eastern Solomons, in which Enterprise suffered damage. I-121 received orders on 26 August 1942 to move south to intercept Enterprise as Enterprise withdrew for repairs. I-121 was on the surface recharging her batteries on 27 August 1942 when two SBD Dauntless dive bombers from the aircraft carrier USS Wasp (CV-7) attacked her at 06:30. As she submerged, one bomb struck her empty mine storage compartment. The damage caused a serious leak, and a few hours later she surfaced to make emergency repairs. Unable to submerge for the remainder of her patrol despite the repairs, she headed for Rabaul. On 28 August 1942, while 80 nautical miles (150 km; 92 mi) northeast of San Cristobal en route Rabaul, she sighted an aircraft carrier and several destroyers at 04:30, and at 08:00 she sighted an aircraft carrier, two cruisers, and four destroyers, but she arrived at Rabaul without further incident at 15:00 on 4 September 1942.

After further repairs, I-121 got underway from Rabaul on 8 September 1942 bound for Japan. After arriving at Kure on 20 September 1942, she underwent an overhaul.

==== New Guinea campaign ====
With her repairs and overhaul complete, I-121 departed Kure on 1 December 1942, stopped at Truk from 10 to 17 December 1942, and arrived at Rabaul on 21 December 1942, where she was reassigned to Submarine Group B. In support of Japanese forces fighting in the New Guinea campaign, she departed Rabaul on 23 December 1942 to carry supplies to Buna on the coast of New Guinea. Reassigned to Submarine Group D, she again got underway from Rabaul on 4 January 1943, patrolling southeast of New Guinea and returning to Rabaul on 25 January 1943. On 29 January 1943, she again put to sea from Rabaul, this time to refuel reconnaissance floatplanes at the Indispensable Reefs. She returned from this operation on 10 February 1943. Departing Rabaul on 14 February 1943, she called at Truk from 18 to 23 February, then proceeded to Japan, where she arrived at Kure on 5 March 1943 for an overhaul. While she was at Kure, her squadron, Submarine Squadron 7, was reassigned to the Southeast Area Fleet.

On 25 April 1943, I-121 departed Kure bound for Rabaul, which she reached on 7 May 1943. She then made her first supply run to Lae, New Guinea, departing Rabaul on 10 May, arriving at Lae on 14 May, dropping off 26 tons of food and ammunition, embarking 15 soldiers, and departing the same day to return to Rabaul, where she arrived on 17 May 1943. She set out for Lae again on 19 May 1943 for her second supply run, but engine trouble forced her to return to Rabaul on 22 May 1943. She had greater success on her third run, getting underway from Rabaul on 23 May, dropping off 26 tons of food and ammunition at Lae on 26 May, and returning to Rabaul on 29 May 1943. On 31 May 1943, Submarine Division 13 was disbanded, and I-121 and I-122 were attached directly to Submarine Squadron 7 headquarters.

I-121 continued making supply runs to Lae throughout June and July and into early August 1943. She started her fourth supply run from Rabaul on 1 June 1943, unloading 26.5 tons of food and ammunition at Lae on 3 June and embarking 15 soldiers, departing the same day, and arriving at Rabaul on 6 June 1943. Her fifth run began on 8 June; she reached Lae on 10 June 1943, again dropped off 26.5 tons of food and ammunition and took aboard 15 soldiers, and left the same day, arriving at Rabaul on 13 June 1943. On her sixth run, she got underway from Rabaul on 20 June 1943 and unloaded 26.5 tons of food and ammunition at Lae on 22 June 1943, leaving for Rabaul the same day. After that, she made three more supply runs in which she called at Lae on 7 July, 27 July, and 3 August 1943.

On 15 August 1943, I-121 was transferred to the Kure Guard Unit in Japan. Before departing for Japan, she made a final supply run to Lae, her tenth, departing Rabaul on 19 August 1943 and arriving at Lae on 20 August. After that she headed for Japan, arriving at Kure on 1 September 1943.

==== Home waters ====
After arriving in Japan, the aging I-121 and I-122, by then considered obsolescent, were withdrawn from combat and assigned duty as training ships at Kure Naval Base. By December 1943, they were part of Submarine Division 18 along with the submarines I-153, I-154, and I-155, which also had been relegated to a training role. On 5 January 1944, I-121 and the submarine I-159 took part in the first stage of submarine camouflage pattern experiments conducted by the Naval Submarine School in the Seto Inland Sea, apparently having their hull and conning tower sides painted in a greenish-gray pattern. Between 23 and 25 February 1945, the two submarines took part in the second stage of the experiments, again in the Seto Inland Sea, with the same camouflage pattern extended to their decks.

On 20 April 1945, I-121 and I-122 were resubordinated to Submarine Division 33 in the Kure Submarine Squadron. I-121 was transferred to the Maizuru Naval Base on 12 June 1945 and remained there through the end of World War II. Hostilities ceased on 15 August 1945, and Japan formally surrendered on 2 September 1945. I-121 surrendered to the Allies in September 1945 at Maizuru.

== Final disposition ==
I-121 was stricken from the Navy list on 30 November 1945. The U.S. Navy scuttled her along with the submarines Ro-68 and Ro-500 in Wakasa Bay off Kanmurijima in the Sea of Japan on 30 April 1946.

A periscope that is believed to have come from I-121 was sold to Norman Edmund of Edmund Optics in 1946 as military surplus. The periscope was displayed at Edmund's retail location in Barrington, New Jersey from 1959 to 2001. It was then donated to the Battleship New Jersey Museum and Memorial where it is currently on display in the museum's visitors center. It is believed to be the only periscope of an ocean going Imperial Japanese submarine to be on display

== Bibliography ==
- Boyd, Carl, and Akihiko Yoshida. The Japanese Submarine Force and World War II. Annapolis, Maryland: Naval Institute Press, 1995. ISBN 1-55750-015-0.
