= USS Crystal =

Patrol vessel of the United States Navy

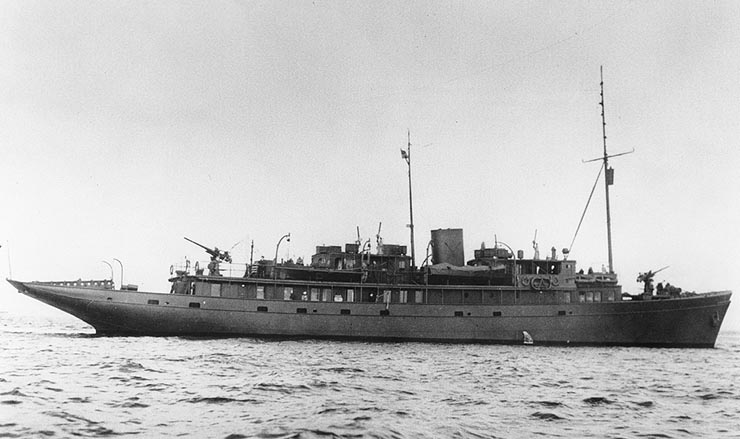
- USS Crystal (PY-25)

History

United States
- Name: Cambriona; Vida; Crystal
- Namesake: Crystal
- Builder: Pusey and Jones Corporation, Wilmington, Delaware
- Yard number: 407/1042
- Laid down: 12 March 1929
- Launched: 7 October 1929
- Acquired: 15 January 1942
- Commissioned: 24 February 1942
- Decommissioned: 6 March 1946
- Identification: Signal (1931): MHSR; U.S. Official Number 229626; IMO: 5082649
- Fate: Sold for Navy by Maritime Commission. Commercial operation in Central and South America, fate unknown.

General characteristics
- Tonnage: 954 GRT, 427 Net
- Length: 234 ft 10 in (71.58 m) (overall); 206.5 ft (62.9 m) (registered length)
- Beam: 34 ft (10 m)
- Draft: 12 ft (3.7 m) (yacht); 13 ft (4.0 m) (Navy)
- Propulsion: 2 x Winton 157 diesels, 1,100shp, two shafts
- Speed: 18 kn (33 km/h)
- Complement: 40 (yacht); Not given (Navy)
- Armament: 2 x 3"/50 dual purpose mounts

USS Crystal (PY-25), built in 1929 as the yacht Cambriona for Walter O. Briggs of Detroit, Michigan, was a patrol yacht in the United States Navy. The Navy acquired the yacht in January 1942 as Vida commissioning the vessel as Crystal in February. Naval service was in Hawaii until November 1945. After sale in November 1947 the vessel operated commercially in Central and South America.

== Construction ==
Cambriona, the third of three yachts of identical design developed by joint efforts of the naval architectural firms Cox & Stevens, Incorporated and John H. Wells, Incorporated, was built by the Pusey and Jones Co., Wilmington, Delaware. (Note: DANFS is incorrect stating the yacht was built as Vida.) The vessel was assigned yard hull numbers 407/1042 (Note: A new series of hull numbers began in 1918. The new series became the only one used in 1941.) with keel laid 12 March 1929 and launch on 7 October 1929. Cambriona was delivered to the owner on 6 May 1930. The other two Pusey and Jones built yachts of the same design were Nakhoda, hull 405/1040, for Frederick J. Fisher and Rene, hull 406/1041, for Alfred P. Sloan. (Note: Rene was also acquired by the Navy to become Beryl (PY-23).)

The yacht was 234 ft 10 in (71.58 m) overall length, 206.5 ft (62.9 m) (registered length), 34.2 ft 0 in (10.42 m) beam with a depth of 16.8 ft 0 in (5.12 m). As built draft was 12 ft (3.7 m) with Navy giving draft as 13 ft 0 in (3.96 m). Cambriona had two Winton diesel engines of 1,100 horsepower driving twin screws. The yacht was lavishly furnished with a crew of forty. Cambriona was registered with U.S. Official Number 229626, home port of Detroit, Michigan with signal letters MHSR.

== Yacht ==
=== Cambriona ===
Cambriona had an apartment suite for the owner that included two baths and five double staterooms with private baths for guests on the berth deck. The main deck had a large dining room forward with a hallway running through the pantry and galley area to music and living rooms and the owner's lounge and library. Above was a bridge deck with bridge, captain's quarters, radio and navigation rooms forward in a deck house. In an after house were smoking room, gymnasium and club room.

From 1930 until its sale in 1941 Briggs' captain of the yacht was Gaston R. De Groote who would later captain the first nuclear powered merchant ship NS Savannah.

=== Vida ===
Cambriona was bought in 1938 by Erle P. Halliburton. Halliburton, founder of the New Method Oil Well Cementing Company now known as Halliburton and member of the Newport Harbor Yacht Club, Newport Beach, California, named the yacht for his daughter as Vida under Honduran registry. The yacht was the largest in Newport Harbor and used for weekend trips to Catalina and cruises to Alaska, Mexico and Honduras.

== Navy service ==
Vida was acquired by the Navy, 15 January 1942 and commissioned on 24 February 1942. The vessel arrived at Pearl Harbor 1 May 1942 for patrol and escort duty with the Hawaiian Sea Frontier. She served escorting Army transports and merchant vessels to outlying islands, transporting civilian workers and servicemen and participating in exercises and drills with destroyers. From 1 December 1943 to 14 April 1944 Vida was based at Midway for patrol duty, exercises and training with submarines. After overhaul at Pearl Harbor she returned to operations with weather station patrols added to her duties. On 8 November 1945 she got underway for the west coast arriving at San Francisco 17 November. Crystal was decommissioned there 6 March 1946 and was transferred to the custody of the Maritime Commission (MC) 2 April 1947 for disposal.

== Post Navy ==
The vessel was placed by the MC in the reserve fleet for custody only awaiting sale on behalf of the Navy on 8 November 1946. On 12 February 1947 the vessel was sold to Clyde Webster and withdrawn from the fleet 7 April for delivery to Navy, the buyer and Barnett Shipping. With the name Crystal retained the ship was apparently given IMO number 5082649. The vessel was used as a freighter and passenger service in Central and South America. The ship's fate is unknown.
