= Japanese submarine I-56 (1943) =

1943 Type B3 submarine

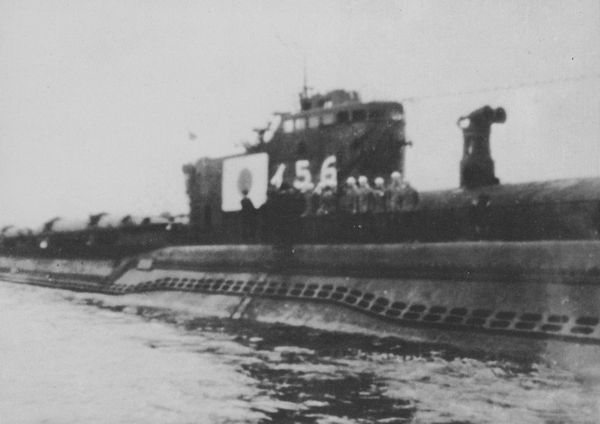
- I-56 anchored off Ōtsu on 21 December 1944

History

Japan
- Name: Submarine No. 629
- Builder: Yokosuka Naval Arsenal, Yokosuka, Japan
- Laid down: 29 September 1942
- Renamed: I-56 on 12 June 1943
- Launched: 30 June 1943
- Completed: 8 June 1944
- Commissioned: 8 June 1944
- Fate: Missing April 1945
- Stricken: 10 June 1945

General characteristics
- Class & type: Type B3 submarine
- Displacement: 2,140 long tons (2,174 t) surfaced; 3,688 long tons (3,747 t) submerged
- Length: 108.7 m (357 ft)
- Beam: 9.3 m (31 ft)
- Draft: 5.19 m (17.0 ft)
- Propulsion: 2 × Kampon Mk.22 diesel engines, 4,700 hp (3,500 kW); 2 × Electric motors, 1,200 hp (890 kW)
- Speed: 17.7 knots (33 km/h) surfaced; 6.5 knots (12 km/h) submerged
- Range: 21,000 nmi (39,000 km) at 16 kn (30 km/h; 18 mph) surfaced; 105 nmi (194 km) at 3 kn (5.6 km/h; 3.5 mph) submerged
- Test depth: 100 m (328 ft)
- Complement: 94 officers and men
- Armament: 6 × 533 mm (21 in) torpedo tubes; 19 × Type 95 torpedoes; 2 × Type 96 25 mm (0.98 in) AA guns
- Aircraft carried: 1 × floatplane (removed February–March 1945)
- Aviation facilities: Hangar and catapult (removed February–March 1945)

The second I-56 was an Imperial Japanese Navy Type B3 submarine. Completed and commissioned in June 1944, she served in the late stages of World War II and took part in the Philippines campaign at the time of the Battle of Leyte Gulf. She then operated as a kaiten torpedo carrier, including during the Battle of Okinawa, before she was lost in April 1945.

== Construction and commissioning ==
I-56 was laid down on 29 September 1942 by the Yokosuka Naval Arsenal at Yokosuka, Japan, with the name Submarine No. 629. On 12 June 1943, she was both renamed I-56, the second submarine of the name, and provisionally attached to the Kure Naval District. Launched on 30 June 1943, she was completed and commissioned on 8 June 1944.

== Service history ==
Upon commissioning, I-56 was attached formally to the Kure Naval District and assigned to Submarine Squadron 11 in the 6th Fleet for workups. With those completed, she was reassigned to Submarine Division 15 in Submarine Squadron 1 in the 6th Fleet on 20 September 1944. In early October 1944, she began conversion to a kaiten suicide attack torpedo carrier, in which her 140-millimeter (5.5 in) deck gun was removed to make room on her afterdeck for fittings that allowed her to carry four kaitens. By this time, she also had radar and a radar detector installed.

=== First war patrol ===
On 12 October 1944, the Formosa Air Battle began, in which the aircraft carriers of United States Navy Task Force 38 launched five days of air strikes against Japanese bases on Formosa and on northern Luzon in the Philippine Islands. I-56's conversion was halted that day and she began preparations to deploy for her first war patrol, operating as a conventional submarine.

The commander-in-chief of the Combined Fleet, Admiral Soemu Toyoda, activated Operation Shō-Gō 1 for the defense of the Philippine Islands on 13 October 1944. On 15 October, I-56 was assigned along with the submarines I-26, I-45, I-53, and I-54 to Submarine Group A under the direct command of the 6th Fleet. She departed Kure that day with orders to attack Task Force 38, assigned to a patrol area in the Philippine Sea 240 nautical miles (440 km; 280 mi) southeast of Formosa.

On 18 October 1944, I-56 received orders to patrol east of Leyte in the Philippines, and was expected to arrive in that area on 24 October. The Battle of Leyte began with the U.S. landings on Leyte on 20 October 1944, and the Japanese naval reaction to the landings resulted in the Battle of Leyte Gulf of 23–26 October 1944.

On the second day of that battle, I-56 was the Philippine Sea east of Mindanao on 24 October when she fired three torpedoes fitted with magnetic exploders at the New Guinea-bound U.S. Navy Task Group 78.1. Her crew heard three explosions, and her commanding officer believed that his submarine had sunk three transports, but apparently some of the torpedoes detonated prematurely. Actually, her torpedoes damaged the tank landing ship USS LST-695, which survived and later reached Guam under tow by the tank landing ship USS LST-985. The patrol frigate USS Carson City attempted a counterattack against I-56, but without success.

On 25 October 1944, I-56 was in the Philippine Sea northeast of Mindanao when an escort of U.S. Navy Task Group 77.1 (call sign "Taffy 1") detected her at 22:32. The task group′s escort aircraft carriers began a 90-degree emergency turn to avoid the submarine. At 22:34, I-56 fired five torpedoes, and her crew heard three explosions 50 seconds later. Although some sources credit I-56 with torpedoing the escort carrier USS Santee, Santee was off Samar and was not part of the task group I-56 attacked. Shortly after the carriers began their turn, two torpedo wakes straddled the escort carrier USS Petrof Bay. The destroyer escort USS Coolbaugh counterattacked, causing several leaks aboard I-56, which dived to 460 feet (140 m). Coolbaugh claimed to have sunk a submarine at 09°52′N 127°30′E, but I-56 survived, and when she surfaced later she recovered an unexploded Mark 9 depth charge from her afterdeck. She mistakenly reported sinking an aircraft carrier. With only three torpedoes left aboard, one of them defective, I-56 was ordered back to Japan. She arrived at Kure on 4 November 1944, and was credited with sinking an aircraft carrier, a destroyer, and three transports during her patrol, although in truth her only success had been damage to one tank landing ship.

=== First kaiten mission ===
Conversion of I-56 to carry four kaitens on fittings on her afterdeck resumed upon her return to Kure. She began kaiten launch drills on 12 November 1944.

In December 1944, I-56 was assigned to the Kongo ("Steel") Kaiten Group along with the submarines I-36, I-47, I-48, I-53, and I-58 for an attack scheduled for dawn on 11 January 1945 on five different U.S. anchorages in widely separated locations; the date of the attack later was postponed to 12 January 1945. At 13:00 on 22 December 1944, she got underway from the kaiten base at Otsujima bound for her target, the Allied anchorage in Seeadler Harbor at Manus Island in the Admiralty Islands in the Bismarck Sea. While en route, she received a 6 January 1945 report from a Japanese reconnaissance plane reporting six cruisers and 28 transports anchored at Manus.

The ammunition ship USS Mount Hood had exploded catastrophically at Manus for unknown reasons on 10 November 1944, and the Japanese propagandist Tokyo Rose had claimed in a radio broadcast that a Japanese midget submarine had sunk her. As a result, the Allies had stepped up their antisubmarine patrols around Manus, and on 10 January 1945 I-56 began to experience the increased patrolling when Allied antisubmarine forces sighted her 60 nautical miles (110 km; 69 mi) west of Manus while she was attempting to get a fix on her position and pursued her for an hour before she broke contact.

On 11 January 1945, I-56 surfaced 50 nautical miles (93 km; 58 mi) north of Seeadler Harbor at 23:00 to charge her batteries in preparation for a run in on the surface to launch her kaitens for the scheduled 12 January 1945 attack. When she was 35 nautical miles (65 km; 40 mi) north of the harbor, her radar detector detected an approaching Allied aircraft. I-56 dived, and shortly thereafter her sonar operator heard several ships searching the area for her. Her commanding officer decided to postpone the attack, and I-56 retired to the north.

After dark on 12 January 1945, I-56 surfaced 60 nautical miles (110 km; 69 mi) north of Seeadler Harbor and began another run in on the surface. When she was still 40 nautical miles (74 km; 46 mi) out, her radar detector detected an Allied aircraft, and five minutes later she spotted an Allied ship on her radar and her radio operator reported hearing an Allied transmission in English ordering the launch of more aircraft. I-56 flooded down to reduce her silhouette and continued her approach. An Allied antisubmarine aircraft eventually attacked her, and she submerged at 02:30 on 13 January 1945. After her sound operator heard the propeller noises of several ships ahead, she again aborted her attack and withdrew.

On the evening of 13 January 1945, the 6th Fleet ordered I-56 to make one last attempt to launch her kaitens and then return to Japan. She began another approach to Manus. She was 55 nautical miles (102 km; 63 mi) west of Manus at 03:10 on 14 January 1945 when an Allied antisubmarine aircraft attacked her, and she again aborted her kaiten attack. On 18 January 1945, she received orders to return to Japan with all four of her kaitens aboard so that the ability of kaitens to withstand lengthy sea voyages could be evaluated. On 3 February 1945, she reached Otsujima, where she disembarked her four kaitens and their pilots. She then continued on to Kure.

=== Second kaiten mission ===
After her return to Kure, I-56 underwent a refit in which her aircraft hangar and catapult were removed from her foredeck and replaced by fittings that allowed her to carry two more kaitens, bringing her total kaiten load to six. Between 26 and 29 March 1945, U.S. forces landed in the Kerama Islands southwest of Okinawa and captured advance bases in preparation for an invasion of Okinawa itself. On 31 March 1945, I-56 was assigned to the Tatara Kaiten Unit, which also included the submarines I-44, I-47, and I-58, each carrying six kaitens, and that day she put to sea from Otsujima with six kaitens aboard, bound for an operating area northeast of Okinawa. On 1 April 1945, the Battle of Okinawa began with U.S. landings on the island.

=== Loss ===
I-56 was lost sometime in April, and the circumstances of her loss remain unknown. Most Japanese historians credit the destroyer USS Hudson with sinking her on 5 April 1945, but most of their Western counterparts have concluded that Hudson sank the submarine Ro-49. Some Western historians credit I-56 with sinking the U.S. submarine USS Snook sometime after 8 April 1945, but Japanese sources do not confirm it.

On 17 April 1945, the battleship USS Missouri detected a surfaced submarine on radar at a range of 12 nautical miles (22 km; 14 mi) at 23:05, and a hunter-killer group consisting of the light aircraft carrier Bataan and several destroyers set off in pursuit of it. The destroyer Heermann established radar contact on the submarine, and the destroyer Uhlmann subsequently launched a depth-charge attack against it. On the morning of 18 April 1945, two aircraft from Bataan and the destroyers Collett, McCord, and Mertz, made a coordinated attack against the submarine, and after several hours it was sunk at 26°42′N 130°38′E. The identity of the submarine sunk on 18 April 1945 remains a mystery, but I-56 is a likely candidate.

On 2 May 1945, the Imperial Japanese Navy declared I-56 to be presumed lost in the Okinawa area with the loss of all 122 men aboard — 116 crewmen and six embarked kaiten pilots. She was stricken from the Navy list on 10 June 1945.

== Sources ==
- Hackett, Bob & Kingsepp, Sander. IJN Submarine I-56: Tabular Record of Movement. Retrieved on 15 September 2020.
