= Japanese submarine I-56 =

Japanese submarine I-56 may refer to one of the following submarines of the Imperial Japanese Navy:

- Japanese submarine I-56 (1928), a Kaidai-class cruiser submarine; renamed I-156 in 1942; scuttled in 1946
- Japanese submarine I-56 (1943), a B3-class cruiser submarine; sunk in 1945
