= I-54 =

I-54 or i54 may refer to:

- Japanese submarine I-54, the name of more than one Imperial Japanese Navy submarine
- Type B Mod. 2 submarine, a class of Imperial Japanese Navy submarine
- i54, a business park in West Midlands, United Kingdom
