= TCG Gayret =

TCG Gayret may refer to one of the following Turkish Navy ships:

- TCG Gayret (1940), a Demirhisar-class destroyer ordered from the United Kingdom just prior to World War II; after the outbreak of that war, ship was purchased by the Royal Navy and renamed HMS Ithuriel (H05); damaged beyond repair by German air attack in Algeria in November 1942; never served in the Turkish Navy
- TCG Gayret (1941), the former British O-class destroyer HMS Oribi (G66); acquired by the Turkish Navy in 1946; scrapped in 1965
- TCG Gayret (D352), the former American Gearing-class destroyer USS Eversole (DD-789) acquired by the Turkish Navy in 1973; struck in 1995; currently a museum ship at İzmit, Turkey
