= Type B submarine =

Imperial Japanese Navy submarine class

Class overview
- Name: Type-B submarines
- Builders: Kure Naval Arsenal; Sasebo Naval Arsenal; Yokosuka Naval Arsenal; Kawasaki Shipbuilding; Mitsubishi Heavy Industries
- Operators: Imperial Japanese Navy
- Preceded by: Junsen Type A
- Succeeded by: Junsen Type C
- Subclasses: Type-B (I-15 class); Type-B Modified 1 (I-40 class); Type-B Modified 2 (I-54 class)
- Built: 1938-1944
- In commission: 1940-1945

The Cruiser submarine Type-B (巡潜乙型潜水艦, Junsen Otsu-gata sensuikan) was a class of submarine in the Imperial Japanese Navy (IJN) which served during World War II. The Type-B submarines were similar to the Type-A apart from not having the headquarters installation.

== Class variants ==
The Type-B submarines were divided into four classes:

- Type-B (乙型（伊十五型）, Otsu-gata, I-15-class)
- Type-B Mod.1 (乙型改一（伊四十型）, Otsu-gata Kai-1, I-40-class)
- Type-B Mod.2 (乙型改二（伊五十四型）, Otsu-gata Kai-2, I-54-class)
- V22A Type (第5115号艦型, Dai-5115-Gō kan-gata, 5115th vessel-class). The 5115th vessel-class submarines were not built and remained a design only.

=== Type-B (I-15 class) ===
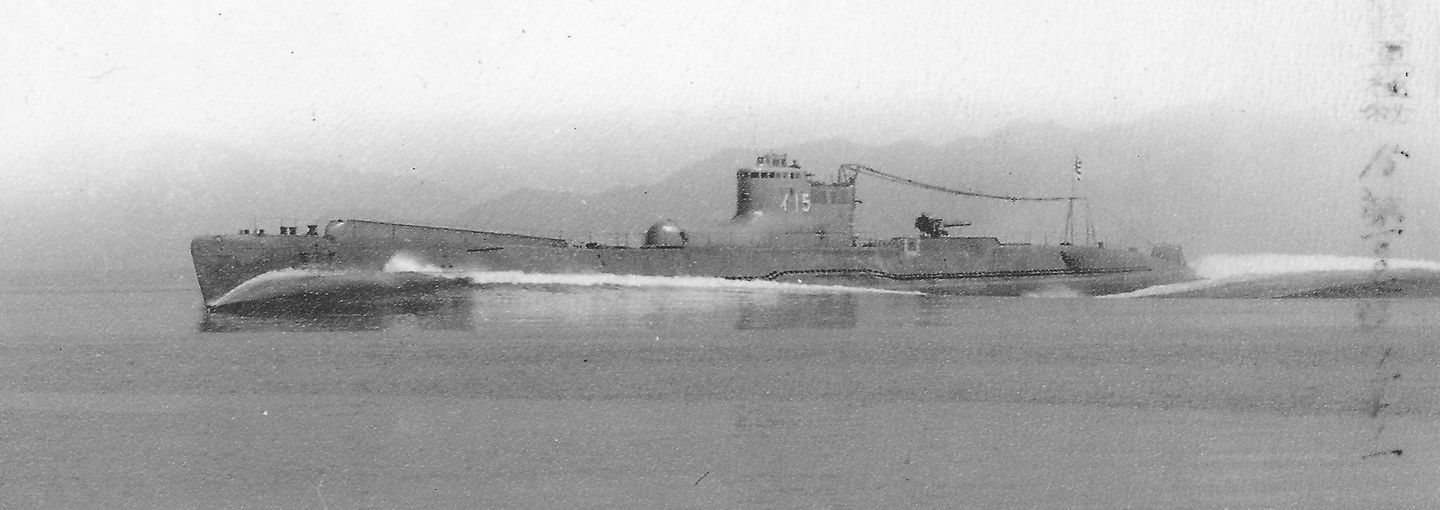
I-15 on 15 September 1940

Project number S37. Twenty boats were built between 1937 and 1944 under the Maru 3 Programme (Boats 37 - 42) and Maru 4 Programme (Boats 139 - 152).

Boats in class
Boat No.	Boat	Builder	Laid down	Launched	Completed	Fate
37	I-15 (Note: 伊号第15潜水艦 (I-Gō Dai-15 Sensuikan).)	Kure Naval Arsenal	25 January 1938	7 March 1939	30 September 1940	Sunk by USS Southard near San Cristóbal on 10 November 1942.
38	I-17	Yokosuka Naval Arsenal	18 April 1938	19 July 1939	24 January 1941	Sunk by HMNZS Tui and maritime patrol aircraft at Nouméa 23°26′S 166°54′E on 19 August 1943.
39	I-19	Mitsubishi, Kōbe Shipyard	15 March 1938	16 September 1939	28 April 1941	Sunk by USS Radford in the Gilbert Islands on 25 November 1943.
40	I-21	Kawasaki, Kōbe Shipyard	7 January 1939	24 February 1940	15 July 1941	Missing near Tarawa after 27 November 1943. Possibly sunk by aircraft from USS Chenango on 29 November 1943.
41	I-23	Yokosuka Naval Arsenal	8 December 1938	24 November 1939	27 September 1941	Missing near the Hawaiian Islands after 24 February 1942, most likely due to a diving accident.
42	I-25	Mitsubishi, Kōbe Shipyard	3 February 1939	8 June 1940	15 October 1941	Missing near Espiritu Santo after 23 August 1943. Possibly sunk by USS Patterson on 25 August 1943.
43						The dummy for the naval budget of the Yamato-class battleship.
139	I-26	Kure Naval Arsenal	7 June 1939	10 April 1940	6 November 1941	Missing east of the Philippines after 25 October 1944. Possibly sunk by USS Richard M. Rowell on 26 October 1944.
140	I-27	Sasebo Naval Arsenal	5 July 1939	6 June 1940	24 February 1942	Sunk by HMS Paladin and HMS Petard in the Maldives at 00°57′N 72°16′E on 12 February 1944.
141	I-28	Mitsubishi, Kōbe Shipyard	25 September 1939	17 December 1940	6 February 1942	Sunk by USS Tautog north of Rabaul at 06°30′N 152°00′E on 17 May 1942.
142	I-29	Yokosuka Naval Arsenal	20 September 1939	29 September 1940	27 February 1942	Sunk by USS Sawfish south of Sabtang Island at 20°10′N 121°50′E on 26 July 1944.
143	I-30	Kure Naval Arsenal	7 June 1939	17 September 1940	28 February 1942	Sunk by a British mine at Singapore on 13 October 1942. Raised and scrapped between August 1959 and February 1960.
144	I-31	Yokosuka Naval Arsenal	6 December 1939	13 March 1941	30 May 1942	Sunk by USS Frazier at Attu Island on 13 May 1943.
145	I-32	Sasebo Naval Arsenal	20 January 1940	17 December 1940	26 April 1942	Sunk by USS Manlove and USS PC-1135 northeast of Wotje Atoll on 24 March 1943.
146	I-33	Mitsubishi, Kōbe Shipyard	21 February 1940	1 May 1941	10 June 1942	Lost in an accident at Truk on 26 September 1942. Salvaged and repaired starting 29 December 1943. Later, lost in another accident at Iyo Nada on 13 June 1944. Salvaged and scrapped starting 28 June 1953.
147	I-34	Sasebo Naval Arsenal	9 January 1941	24 September 1941	31 August 1942	Sunk by HMS Taurus at Penang Island on 13 November 1943. Salvaged on 4 December 1962.
148	I-35	Mitsubishi, Kōbe Shipyard	2 September 1940	24 September 1941	31 August 1942	Sunk by USS Meade and USS Frazier south of Tarawa on 22 November 1943.
149	I-36	Yokosuka Naval Arsenal	4 December 1940	1 November 1941	30 September 1942	Converted to a Kaiten mother ship on 1 September 1944. Decommissioned on 30 November 1945, blown up (along with Ha-106) off the Gotō Islands on 1 April 1946 as part of Operation Road's End.
150	I-37	Kure Naval Arsenal	7 December 1940	22 October 1941	10 March 1943	Converted to a Kaiten mother ship on 9 September 1944. Sunk by USS Conklin and USS McCoy Reynolds north of Palau, on 19 November 1944.
151	I-38	Sasebo Naval Arsenal	19 June 1941	15 April 1942	31 January 1943	Sunk by USS Nicholas east of Luzon on 13 November 1944.
152	I-39	Sasebo Naval Arsenal	19 June 1941	15 April 1942	22 April 1943	Sunk by USS Boyd west of Makin at 03°10′N 171°55′E on 16 November 1943.
153						The dummy for the naval budget of the Yamato-class battleships

=== Type-B Mod.1 (I-40 class) ===
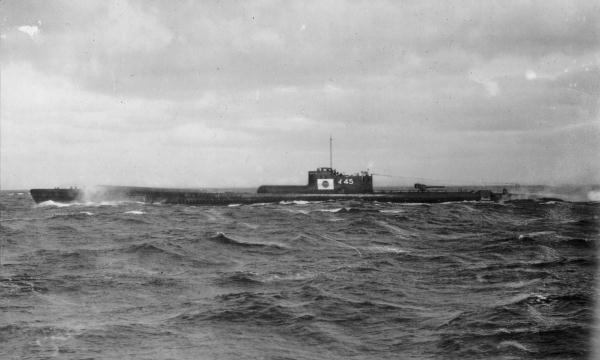
I-45 in 1943

Project number S37B. Six boats were planned under the Maru Kyū Programme (Boats 370 - 375), all boats were completed. On the outside this class looked the same as the I-15 class; however, they were built from high-tensile strength steel and equipped with diesel engines of a simpler design.

Boats in class
Boat No.	Boat	Builder	Laid down	Launched	Completed	Fate
370	I-40	Kure Naval Arsenal	18 March 1942	10 November 1942	31 July 1943	Missing after 22 November 1943.
371	I-41	Kure Naval Arsenal	18 March 1942	10 November 1942	18 September 1943	Sunk by USS Lawrence C. Taylor east of the Philippines at 12°44′N 130°42′E on 18 November 1944.
372	I-42	Kure Naval Arsenal	18 March 1942	10 November 1942	3 November 1943	Sunk by USS Tunny southwest of Palau at 06°40′N 134°03′E on 23 March 1944.
373	I-43	Sasebo Naval Arsenal	27 April 1942	25 October 1942	5 November 1943	After completion, converted to a carrier for a Daihatsu-class landing barge. Sunk by USS Aspro north of Truk at 12°42′N 149°17′E on 15 February 1944.
374	I-44	Yokosuka Naval Arsenal	11 June 1942	5 March 1943	31 January 1944	Converted to a Kaiten mother ship on 22 October 1944. Sunk by an aircraft from USS Tulagi southeast of Okinawa at 24°15′N 131°16′E on 29 April 1945.
375	I-45	Sasebo Naval Arsenal	15 July 1942	6 March 1943	28 December 1943	Sunk by USS Whitehurst east of the Philippines on 29 October 1944.

=== Type-B Mod.2 (I-54 class) ===
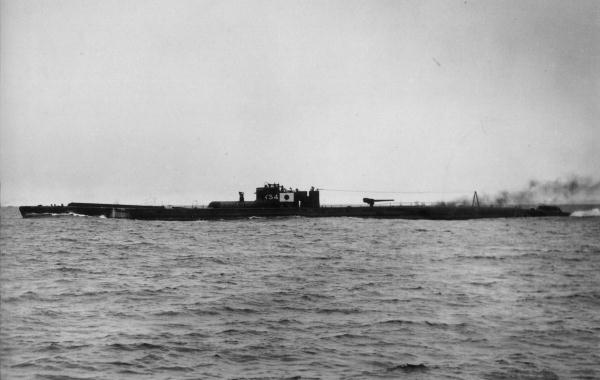
I-54 in 1944

Project number S37C. Twenty-one boats were planned under the Maru Kyū Programme (Boats 627 - 636) and Kai-Maru 5 Programme (Boats 5101 - 5114). Eighteen boats were cancelled in late 1943, because the IJN was setting the Type E submarine (戊型潜水艦, Bo-gata sensuikan) as 1945's main submarines.

- Boats in class

Boat No.	Boat	Builder	Laid down	Launched	Completed	Results	Fate
627	I-54	Yokosuka Naval Arsenal	1 July 1942	4 May 1943	31 March 1944	Damaged USS Santee on 25-10-1944 (?) (Note: This result is estimated with a 'thing' by I-56 in many Japanese documents)	Sunk east of Leyte by USS Helm and USS Gridley on 28 October 1944. (Note: Although several sources credit Richard M. Rowell with sinking I-54 on 26 October 1944, her target was most likely I-56, which survived the encounter.)
629	I-56	Yokosuka Naval Arsenal	29 September 1942	30 June 1943	8 June 1944	Damaged USS LST-695 on 24 October 1944. Damaged USS Santee on 25 October 1944 (?).	Conversion to a Kaiten mother ship began in early October 1943 and completed in November 1944. Sunk by USS Heermann, USS Uhlmann, USS Mertz, USS Collett and aircraft from USS Bataan east of Okinawa at 26°42′N 130°38′E on 18 April 1945.
631	I-58	Yokosuka Naval Arsenal	26 December 1942	9 October 1943	7 September 1944	Sank SS Wild Hunter on 28 July 1945, possibly by Kaiten; Sank USS Indianapolis on 30 July 1945; Damaged USS Thomas F. Nickel on 12 August 1945 by Kaiten (?)	Converted to a Kaiten mother ship before completion. Decommissioned on 30 November 1945, scuttled off the Gotō Islands on 1 April 1946 as part of Operation Road's End. Wreck found in 2017.
633 - 636							Cancelled in 1943
5101 - 5114							Cancelled in 1943

=== V22A Type ===
Project number S49A. Eighteen boats were planned under the Kai-Maru 5 Programme (Boats 5115 - 5132). However, all boats were cancelled in late 1943, because the IJN concentrated on production of Type-E submarine (戊型潜水艦, Bo-gata sensuikan) from 1945.

- Boats in class

Boat No.	Boat	Builder	Laid down	Launched	Completed	Fate
5115 - 5132						Cancelled in 1943

== Characteristics ==
Type		Type-B (I-15)	Type-B Mod. 1 (I-40)	Type-B Mod. 2 (I-54)	V22A Type
Displacement	Surfaced	2,198 long tons (2,233 t)	2,230 long tons (2,266 t)	2,140 long tons (2,174 t)	2,330 long tons (2,367 t)
Displacement	Submerged	3,654 long tons (3,713 t)	3,700 long tons (3,759 t)	3,688 long tons (3,747 t)	No data
Length (overall)		108.70 m (356 ft 8 in)	108.70 m (356 ft 8 in)	108.70 m (356 ft 8 in)	106.50 m (349 ft 5 in) (waterline)
Beam		9.30 m (30 ft 6 in)	9.30 m (30 ft 6 in)	9.30 m (30 ft 6 in)	9.64 m (31 ft 8 in)
Draft		5.14 m (16 ft 10 in)	5.20 m (17 ft 1 in)	5.19 m (17 ft 0 in)	5.32 m (17 ft 5 in)
Depth		7.90 m (25 ft 11 in)	7.90 m (25 ft 11 in)	7.90 m (25 ft 11 in)	No data
Power plant and shaft		2 × Kampon Mk. 2 Model 10 diesels 2 shafts	2 × Kampon Mk. 1A Model 10 diesels 2 shafts	2 × Kampon Mk. 22 Model 10 diesels 2 shafts	2 × Kampon Mk. 2 Model 10 diesels 2 shafts
Power	Surfaced	12,400 bhp	11,000 bhp	4,700 bhp	11,000 bhp
Power	Submerged	2,000 shp	2,000 shp	1,200 shp	2,400 shp
Speed	Surfaced	23.6 knots (43.7 km/h)	23.5 knots (43.5 km/h)	17.7 knots (32.8 km/h)	22.4 knots (41.5 km/h)
Speed	Submerged	8.0 knots (14.8 km/h)	8.0 knots (14.8 km/h)	6.5 knots (12.0 km/h)	8.0 knots (14.8 km/h)
Range	Surfaced	14,000 nmi (26,000 km) at 16 knots (30 km/h)	14,000 nmi (26,000 km) at 16 knots (30 km/h)	21,000 nmi (39,000 km) at 16 knots (30 km/h)	14,000 nmi (26,000 km) at 16 knots (30 km/h)
Range	Submerged	96 nmi (178 km) at 3 knots (5.6 km/h)	96 nmi (178 km) at 3 knots (5.6 km/h)	105 nmi (194 km) at 3 knots (5.6 km/h)	80 nmi (150 km) at 3 knots (5.6 km/h)
Test depth		100 m (330 ft)	100 m (330 ft)	100 m (330 ft)	100 m (330 ft)
Fuel		774 tons	814 tons	842.8 tons	735 tons
Complement		94	94	94	No data
Armament (initial)		• 6 × 533 mm (21 in) Torpedo tubes (6 × front) • 17 × Type 95 torpedoes • 1 × 140 mm (5.5 in) L/40 11th Year Type naval gun • 2 × Type 96 25mm AA guns	• 6 × 533 mm (21 in) TTs (6 × front) • 17 × Type 95 torpedoes • 1 × 140 mm (5.5 in) L/40 11th Year Type Naval gun • 2 × Type 96 25mm AA guns	• 6 × 533 mm (21 in) TTs (6 × front) • 19 × Type 95 torpedoes • 1 × 140 mm (5.5 in) L/40 11th Year Type Naval gun • 2 × Type 96 25mm AA guns	• 8 × 533 mm (21 in) TTs (8 × front) • 16 × torpedoes • 1 × 14 cm/40 11th Year Type naval gun • 4 × 25mm AA guns • 8 × naval mines
Aircraft and facilities		• Catapult and hangar • 1 × Watanabe E9W1 Slim seaplane	• Catapult and hangar • 1 × Yokosuka E14Y2 Glen seaplane	• Catapult and hangar • 1 × Yokosuka E14Y2 Glen seaplane	• Catapult and hangar • 1 × floatplane

== Bibliography ==
- Milanovich, Kathrin (2021). "The IJN Submarines of the I 15 Class". In Jordan, John (ed.). Warship 2021. Oxford, UK: Osprey Publishing. pp. 29–43. ISBN 978-1-4728-4779-9.
- "Rekishi Gunzō"., History of Pacific War Vol.17 I-Gō Submarines, Gakken (Japan), January 1998, ISBN 4-05-601767-0
- Rekishi Gunzō, History of Pacific War Vol.35 Kō-hyōteki and Kōryū, Gakken (Japan), April 2002, ISBN 4-05-602741-2
- Rekishi Gunzō, History of Pacific War Vol.36 Kairyū and Kaiten, Gakken (Japan), May 2002, ISBN 4-05-602693-9
- Rekishi Gunzō, History of Pacific War Extra, "Perfect guide, The submarines of the Imperial Japanese Forces", Gakken (Japan), March 2005, ISBN 4-05-603890-2
- Model Art Extra No.537, Drawings of Imperial Japanese Naval Vessels Part-3, Model Art Co. Ltd. (Japan), May 1999, Book code 08734–5
- The Maru Special, Japanese Naval Vessels No.31 Japanese Submarines I, Ushio Shobō (Japan), September 1979, Book code 68343-31
