= John Ebersole =

John Ebersole may refer to:

- John H. Ebersole (1925–1993), American pioneer in submarine medicine and radiation oncology, Captain US Navy
- John Ebersole (American football) (born 1948), American former National Football League player
- John Ebersole (educator) (1944–2016), American educator, author and columnist

== See also ==
- John T. Eversole (1915–1942), U.S. Navy officer
