= Japanese submarine I-54 =

Japanese submarine I-54 may refer to one of the following submarines of the Imperial Japanese Navy:

- Japanese submarine I-54 (1926), a Kaidai-type submarine; renamed I-154 in May 1942; stricken from active duty in 1945; scuttled in 1946
- Japanese submarine I-54 (1943), an I-54-class submarine; sunk in 1944
