= USS Heermann =

Fletcher-class destroyer

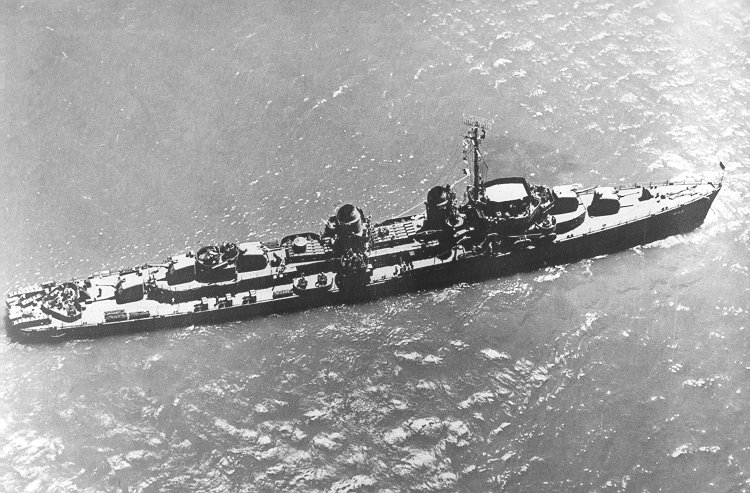
- USS Heermann in an undated wartime photo

History

United States
- Name: USS Heermann
- Namesake: Lewis Heermann
- Builder: Bethlehem Shipbuilding Corporation, San Francisco, California
- Laid down: 8 May 1942
- Launched: 5 December 1942
- Sponsored by: Mrs. Edward B. Briggs
- Commissioned: 6 July 1943 to 12 June 1946
- Recommissioned: 12 September 1951
- Decommissioned: 20 December 1957
- Stricken: 1 September 1975
- Identification: DD-532
- Fate: Transferred to Argentina, 14 August 1961.

Argentina
- Name: Almirante Brown
- Acquired: 14 August 1961
- Decommissioned: 1982
- Stricken: 1982
- Identification: D 20
- Fate: Scrapped 1982

General characteristics as built
- Class & type: Fletcher-class destroyer
- Displacement: 2,325 long tons (2,362 t) standard; 2,942 long tons (2,989 t) full load
- Length: 376 ft 5 in (114.7 m) oa; 369 ft 1 in (112.5 m) wl
- Beam: 39 ft 7 in (12.1 m)
- Draft: 13 ft 9 in (4.19 m) full load
- Propulsion: 60,000 shp (45,000 kW), 2 propellers; 4 × Babcock & Wilcox boilers
- Speed: 38 knots (70 km/h; 44 mph)
- Range: 6,500 nmi (12,000 km; 7,500 mi) at 15 knots (28 km/h; 17 mph)
- Complement: 273
- Armament: 5 × single Mk 12 5 in (127 mm)/38 guns; 5 × twin 40 mm (1.6 in) Bofors AA guns; 7 × single 20 mm (0.8 in) Oerlikon AA guns; 2 × quintuple 21 in (533 mm) torpedo tubes; 6 × single depth charge throwers; 2 × depth charge racks
- Armor: Side: 0.75 in (1.9 cm); Deck: 0.5 in (1.3 cm)

Service record
- Part of: United States Pacific Fleet
- Operations: Operation Galvanic, Landing on Emirau, Mariana and Palau Islands campaign, Philippines campaign, Battle off Samar, Okinawa campaign, Battle of Iwo Jima
- Awards: Presidential Unit Citation for the United States; Presidential Unit Citation for the Philippines; Nine battle stars

USS Heermann (DD-532) was a World War II-era Fletcher-class destroyer in the service of the United States Navy. The ship entered service in 1943 and took part in several battles during World War II in the Pacific theatre of operations, including the Philippines campaign, Battle off Samar and the Battle of Iwo Jima among others. Heermann gained fame during the "last stand of the Tin Can Sailors" in which she and several other destroyers of Task Unit 77.4.3 ("Taffy 3") engaged a far superior Japanese task force during the Battle off Samar in October 1944. Heermann was the only American destroyer of "Taffy 3" to survive the engagement. Following the end of the war in 1945, the ship was placed in reserve from 1946 to 1951, when the destroyer was reactivated. Heermann remained in active service until 1957, when the ship was returned to the reserve. In 1961, Heerman was loaned to Argentina and was renamed ARA Almirante Brown (D-20) while in service with the Argentinian Navy. Almirante Brown remained in Argentinian service until 1982, when the ship was decommissioned.

== Namesake ==
Lewis Heermann was born on 3 August 1779 in Kassel, Germany. He was commissioned as a Surgeon's Mate in the United States Navy on 8 February 1802. On 16 February 1804, during the First Barbary War, Lieutenant Stephen Decatur left Heermann in command of the bomb ketch USS Intrepid while he led a group of American seamen to board the captured frigate USS Philadelphia in Tripoli Harbor and set the frigate ablaze.

When hostilities with the Barbary States closed in 1805, Heermann returned to the United States but soon took leave of absence to study in Europe until 1808 when he returned to active duty in Norfolk, Virginia. Largely due to his pleas for better medical care for the men of the Navy, Congress passed a bill authorizing the construction of hospitals at several naval stations, but the first official U.S. Naval Hospitals were not actually built until after Dr. Heermann's death.

He was transferred to New Orleans, Louisiana in August 1811; and, with the exception of a year in the North for his health and an assignment in 1830 in the Mediterranean where he served for an unknown time as Fleet Surgeon of the Mediterranean Squadron, he remained there until he died in May 1833.

== Description and design ==
The Fletcher-class design departed from US destroyer design, having a larger displacement than previous classes and more extensive armament. The flush deck added to the strength, but the number of systems aboard the ship led to a cramped design. Heermann was among the Fletcher-class ships that got a new bridge design. The standard Fletcher-class ship had a standard displacement of 2,325 long tons (2,362 t) and was 2,942 long tons (2,989 t) at full load. The destroyers were 376 ft 5 in (114.7 m) long overall and 369 ft 1 in (112.5 m) long at the waterline with a beam of 39 ft 7 in (12.1 m) and a draft of 13 ft 9 in (4.19 m) at full load.

The Fletcher class were powered by steam from four Babcock & Wilcox boilers driving two General Electric turbines turning two shafts rated at 60,000 shaft horsepower (45,000 kW). The destroyers carried 492 long tons (500 t) of fuel oil. The ships had a maximum speed of 38 knots (70 km/h; 44 mph) and a range of 6,500 nautical miles (12,000 km; 7,500 mi) at 15 knots (28 km/h; 17 mph). The ships had a complement of 273 officers and enlisted personnel.

The class were initially armed with five 5-inch (127 mm)/38 caliber guns in Mk30 dual-purpose turrets for anti-aircraft and surface warfare, aligned along the centreline. Ten 21-inch (533 mm) torpedo tubes were also equipped. Four single-mounted 1.1-inch (27.9 mm) guns and four 20 mm cannon were equipped for anti-aircraft (AA) defense. For anti-submarine defense, six depth charge throwers and two depth charge racks were installed. Later, three twin-mounted 40 mm guns and the number of 20 mm cannon increased to eleven on Heermann. This would later change again to five twin 40 mm gun mounts and seven 20 mm cannon. The destroyers also had some armor, with 0.75-inch (19 mm) side armor and 0.5-inch (13 mm) armor on the decks over the machinery.

== Service history ==
Heermann was launched on 5 December 1942 by the Bethlehem Shipbuilding Co. of San Francisco, California and sponsored by Mrs. Edward B. Briggs, wife of Lieutenant E. B. Briggs, USCGR, great-grandson of the namesake. The destroyer was commissioned on 6 July 1943.

After shakedown training out of San Diego, California, Heermann joined the 5th Fleet on 21 October 1943 for Operation Galvanic, the assault on the Gilbert Islands. She arrived off Tarawa in Rear Admiral Harry W. Hill's Southern Attack Force on 20 November. Her guns sank a small enemy craft inside the lagoon and the next two days assisted troops ashore with close-in fire support. With the island secured, she returned to Pearl Harbor for repairs and training which ended on 23 January when she sailed in the screen of an attack transport reserve force. After the American assault on Kwajalein on 31 January Heermann spent two weeks patrolling off the island and operated in the screen of escort carriers which were launching strikes in support of troops ashore, followed up by a visit to Eniwetok Atoll and then bombardment duties of Japan and Parry Island. Following the invasion, the destroyer performed fire support and patrol operations off the atoll during mop-up operations.

Heermann was then assigned to the Third Fleet and Task Force 39 on 18 March 1944 after stopping at Majuro Lagoon and then Port Purvis on Florida Island, in the Solomons. For the next month the destroyer escorted convoys which were occupying Emirau Island and seeking out enemy supply barges along the coast of New Hanover. Following a stop at Purvis on 3 June, Heermann took part in the bombardment of a tank farm on Fangelawa Bay, New Ireland on 11 June, and then performed ASW patrols from the Solomons towards the Admiralty, Caroline, and Marshall islands until 26 June. In mid-1944, Heermann escorted merchant shipping from Espiritu Santo, New Hebrides and Nouméa, New Caledonia. The destroyer returned to Port Purvis and departed on 6 September 1944 with Rear Admiral William Sample's escort carrier force, providing escort during the invasion of the Palau Islands. Following this, the destroyer was detached for operations in the Philippine Islands.

=== Battle off Samar: October 1944 ===
Heermann screened transports and landing ships to the beaches of Leyte under the command of recently promoted Commander Amos T. Hathaway, then joined Rear Admiral Thomas L. Sprague's Escort Carrier Group (Task Group 77.4) which was made up of three escort carrier task units, known as the "Three Taffies" because of their voice calls: "Taffy 1", "Taffy 2", and "Taffy 3". Destroyers Hoel and Johnston joined her in screening Rear Admiral Clifton Sprague's unit, "Taffy 3" which also included his flagship Fanshaw Bay and five other escort carriers.

On 25 October 1944 found the task group east of Samar steaming north as the Northern Air Support Group. At 06:45 lookouts observed anti-aircraft fire to the north and within three minutes, were under heavy fire from Japanese Admiral Takeo Kurita's Center Force of four battleships, six heavy cruisers, two light cruisers, and 11 destroyers. In an effort to withdraw away to the south from Kurita's force, the escorts began to make smoke screens to mask the movement of the larger ships. Heermann, on the opposite side of the carriers from the Japanese force at the opening of the battle, steamed into the action at flank speed through the escort carriers which, after launching their planes, formed a rough circle as they made for Leyte Gulf. Smoke and intermittent rain squalls reduced visibility to less than 100 yards (91 m) which led to near collisions, with Heermann forced to avoid the destroyer escort Samuel B. Roberts and destroyer Hoel.

As the escorts began torpedo runs at the Japanese force, Heermann began firing her 5-inch guns at one heavy cruiser, Chikuma, while directing torpedoes at Haguro. Heermann then changed course to engage a column of four battleships whose shells began falling around the destroyer. Heermann targeted Kongō, the column's leader, at which the destroyer launched three torpedoes. Then Heermann switched targets to Haruna, and fired three torpedoes, which were launched from only 4,400 yards (4,000 m). The destroyer retreated after believing one of the torpedoes had struck a target. Japanese records claim that the battleship successfully evaded all of the torpedoes from Heermann, but they were slowed in their pursuit of the American carriers. The battleship Yamato was forced out of the action altogether after reversing course when caught between two spreads.

Heermann laid another smoke screen along the starboard quarter of the carrier formation and then returned to engage the Japanese force of four heavy cruisers. Here the destroyer dueled with Chikuma. A series of 8-inch (203 mm) hits stuck the forward section of the destroyer, flooding it and pulling the bow down so far that the anchors were dragging in the water. One of the 5-inch guns was put out of action but in conjunction with strikes from the carrier aircraft forced Chikuma to withdraw, and the Japanese cruiser sank during her retreat. Chikuma's sister ship Tone took up her sister's battle and engaged Heermann until the destroyer withdrew to lay more smoke. At this point, support from "Taffy 2" arrived to aid the escorts and aircraft attacked Tone forcing the cruiser to withdraw. As more support arrived, the Japanese withdrew. For his skillful maneuvering and leadership Heermann's Commanding Officer, Commander Amos Hathaway, was awarded the Navy Cross.

=== Repairs and return to service ===
Heermann sailed to Kossol Passage for temporary repairs before making for Mare Island and overhaul, which was completed on 15 January 1945. The destroyer was then assigned to fast carrier task forces in the western Pacific. During the Battle of Iwo Jima, Heermann performed radar and anti-submarine picket duty. On 20 March 1945 the destroyer sank a small surface vessel and rescued seven Japanese crew. Seven days later she took part in the night bombardment of Minami Daito Jima. During the Okinawa campaign she took several enemy planes under fire as she guarded carriers. On 18 April in collaboration with destroyers Mertz, McCord, Collett, and Uhlmann and planes from aircraft carrier Bataan, Heermann sank I-56, a carrier of the kaitens—human-guided torpedoes. She continued to support carrier operations off Okinawa until sailing to Leyte Gulf for replenishment and repairs in late June. On 1 July she helped to screen the fast carrier force that devoted the ensuing five weeks to almost continuous air strikes and bombardment.

On 15 August 1945 Heermann was on radar picket station some 200 miles (320 km) southeast of Tokyo when, several hours after the announcement of the end of hostilities, a kamikaze emerged from a cloud bank and began to dive in Heermann's direction—only to be splashed by the destroyer's gunners in one of the final naval actions of World War II. In the following weeks Heermann operated in the screen of the fast carrier task force providing air cover and air-sea rescue service. The destroyer entered Tokyo Bay on 16 September 1945 and remained in the area to support the occupation forces until 7 October when she sailed for the United States. Heermann was decommissioned at San Diego on 12 June 1946.

=== 1951–1957 ===
Heermann remained in reserve at San Diego until re-commissioning on 12 September 1951. After training in local waters off California, she departed San Diego on 4 January 1952 for her new base, NS Newport, Rhode Island, where she arrived on 23 January. She spent 1952 training along the eastern coast from New England to the Virginia Capes, followed by ASW and fleet problems during winter months in the Caribbean. The destroyer returned to Newport for operations along the Northeastern seaboard. After a voyage to Plymouth, England, in June and July 1953, she participated in antisubmarine maneuvers between Newport and the Virginia Capes. Heermann departed on a world cruise 3 December 1953. First she sailed for Yokosuka, Japan, by way of the Panama Canal, San Diego, and the Hawaiian Islands. After a two-day replenishment in Yokosuka, she set course for Okinawa where she acted as part of the escort for 3d Marine Division amphibious warfare landings and conducted barrier patrol in support of the exercise. After more maneuvers took her to Korea, Iwo Jima, and the South Coast of Japan, she returned to Yokosuka which she cleared 22 May 1954 to resume her world cruise, calling at Hong Kong and Singapore on her way to the Suez Canal. In the Mediterranean she visited Port Said, Naples, Villefranche, and Barcelona before returning to Newport 17 July 1954.

For the next year and a half Heermann participated in training exercises along the Atlantic coast. On 1 February she sailed to join the 6th Fleet in exercises along the coast of Lebanon, Israel, and Egypt. In April she was invited by Prince Rainier to be in port for his wedding to Miss Grace Kelly from 19 to 24 April 1956. Heermann furnished a 40-man honor guard for the occasion. From Monaco she joined the 6th Fleet off Greece, and then departed for Fall River, Massachusetts, where she arrived 28 May 1956. Heermann operated out of Newport until 6 November, when she sailed for the Mediterranean where she proved to be a first-rate antisubmarine ship in joint exercises with the Italian Navy.

After revisiting Monaco at the invitation of Prince Rainier and Princess Grace, she returned to Fall River 20 February 1957. She served as gunnery school-ship out of Newport until 30 June when she joined Charles J. Badger in the screen of antisubmarine warfare carrier Leyte for two weeks of air operations for the training of Naval Academy midshipmen. She decommissioned at Boston 20 December 1957 and was assigned to the Boston Group of the U.S. Atlantic Reserve Fleet.

=== Argentine service ===
On 10 August 1961, the ship was commissioned into the Argentine Navy. On 14 August 1961 Heermann was formally transferred on a loan basis to the government of Argentina under terms of the Military Assistance Program. She served in the Argentine Navy under the name Brown (D-20). The ship was decommissioned in 1982.

== Awards ==
In addition to the United States Presidential Unit Citation, Heermann received the Philippine Presidential Unit Citation and nine battle stars for World War II service.
