= USS Whitehurst =

Buckley-class destroyer escort

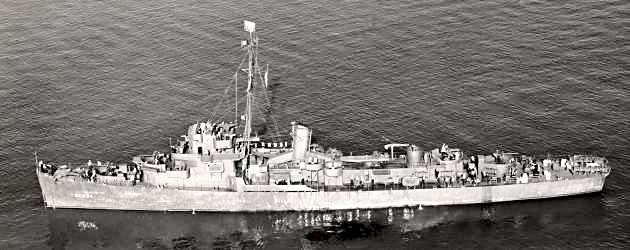

History

United States
- Name: USS Whitehurst
- Namesake: Henry Purefoy Whitehurst, Jr.
- Builder: Bethlehem Shipbuilding Corporation, San Francisco, California
- Laid down: 21 March 1943
- Launched: 5 September 1943
- Commissioned: 19 November 1943
- Decommissioned: 27 November 1946
- Recommissioned: 1 September 1950
- Decommissioned: 6 December 1958
- Recommissioned: 2 October 1961
- Decommissioned: 1 August 1962
- Stricken: 12 July 1969
- Honors and awards: 6 battle stars (World War II); 3 battle stars (Korea)
- Fate: Sunk as a target by Trigger (SS-564) on 28 April 1971

General characteristics
- Class & type: Buckley-class destroyer escort
- Displacement: 1,400 long tons (1,422 t) standard; 1,740 long tons (1,768 t) full load
- Length: 306 ft (93 m)
- Beam: 37 ft (11 m)
- Draft: 9 ft 6 in (2.90 m) standard; 11 ft 3 in (3.43 m) full load
- Propulsion: 2 × boilers; General Electric turbo-electric drive; 12,000 shp (8.9 MW); 2 × solid manganese-bronze 3,600 lb (1,600 kg) 3-bladed propellers, 8 ft 6 in (2.59 m) diameter, 7 ft 7 in (2.31 m) pitch; 2 × rudders; 359 tons fuel oil
- Speed: 23 knots (43 km/h; 26 mph)
- Range: 3,700 nmi (6,900 km) at 15 kn (28 km/h; 17 mph); 6,000 nmi (11,000 km) at 12 kn (22 km/h; 14 mph)
- Complement: 15 officers, 198 men
- Armament: 3 × 3"/50 caliber guns; 1 × quad 1.1"/75 caliber gun; 8 × single 20 mm guns; 1 × triple 21-inch (533 mm) torpedo tubes; 1 × Hedgehog anti-submarine mortar; 8 × K-gun depth charge projectors; 2 × depth charge tracks

USS Whitehurst (DE-634) was a Buckley-class destroyer escort of the United States Navy, named in honor of Ensign Henry Purefoy Whitehurst, Jr., a crew member of the Astoria (CA-34) who was killed during the Battle of Savo Island in August 1942.

== Service history ==
Whitehurst (DE-634) was laid down on 21 March 1943 at San Francisco, California, by the Bethlehem Steel Co.; launched on 5 September 1943; sponsored by Mrs Robie S. Whitehurst, mother of Ensign Whitehurst and commissioned on 19 November 1943.

=== World War II ===
Following shakedown off the west coast, Whitehurst proceeded to Hawaii, arriving at Pearl Harbor on 4 February 1944. Underway for the Solomons on the 7th, she sailed via Majuro and Funafuti with James E. Craig (DE-201) and SC-502, escorting SS George Ross, SS George Constantine and SS Robert Lucas, arriving on 23 February at Espiritu Santo in the New Hebrides.

After shifting to Nouméa, New Caledonia, and back to Espiritu Santo, Whitehurst joined Osterhaus (DE-164) and Acree (DE-167) on 22 March to escort oilers Kankakee (AO-39), Escambia (AO-80), and Atascosa (AO-66). Whitehurst and Atascosa were detached from that task unit on 26 March to proceed independently to a rendezvous with other task forces operating in the area. While Atascosa refueled ships from Destroyer Squadron 47, an enemy aircraft appeared, all ships opened fire but no hits were observed and Whitehurst returned to Espiritu Santo.

After escorting President Monroe (AP-104) to Milne Bay, New Guinea, Whitehurst remained in New Guinea waters for escort duties until 17 May. She then participated in the amphibious operation against Wakde Island, screening the amphibious ships. Whitehurst, with Task Unit (TU) 72.2.9, later escorted echelon S-4 of the invasion force to Humboldt Bay. The destroyer escort subsequently joined Wilkes (DD-441), Nicholson (DD-442), and Swanson (DD-443), to screen echelon H-2 as it steamed toward Bosnic, Biak, in the Schouten Islands, for the landings there.

Arriving off Biak on 28 May, Whitehurst took up a patrol station off the western entrance to the channel between Owi Island and Biak. While there, she received an urgent message from LCI-34 which was under fire by Japanese shore batteries. Whitehurst provided counter-battery fire and was herself targeted but all rounds missed and she was relieved by Stockton (DD-646) and Swanson. Whitehurst then escorted LCT-260 while she evacuated casualties from the beachhead and later screened echelon H-2 as it retired from Biak to Humboldt Bay.

Whitehurst carried out escort duties and trained through the summer of 1944. She was tasked with the anti-submarine and anti-aircraft screen of TU 77.7.1, a group of fleet tankers supplying the 7th Fleet.

On 29 October, Whitehurst received word that, the previous day, Eversole (DE-404) had been torpedoed and sunk by I-45. While Bull (DE-693) picked up survivors, Whitehurst detected a submerged submarine probably I-45 on her sonar, about 50 nautical miles (93 km; 58 mi) from the site of Eversole′s sinking. After making three unsuccessful Hedgehog attacks, the submarine tried to escape by diving to a depth of 225 feet (69 m). At 06:48, Whitehurst conducted a fourth Hedgehog attack, which resulted in five or six small explosions, followed by a large underwater explosion that disabled her sonar. Whitehurst resumed her search at 07:20 and noted a large amount of oil, wood and other debris, some of which her motor whaleboat recovered at 10°10′N 127°28′E, and headed back to Kossol Roads in the Palaus with TU 77.7.1.

A month later, while escorting a 12-ship convoy from Leyte to New Guinea, Whitehurst came under attack by two Japanese "Lily" medium bombers. One dropped a bomb that fell clear of the ships, the second started a glide bombing attack, but Whitehurst claimed it shot down.

After arriving with the convoy at New Guinea on 25 November, Whitehurst spent the remainder of 1944 and the first few months of 1945 in escort operations between New Guinea and the Philippines.

When the landings on Okinawa commenced on 1 April 1945, Whitehurst was part of Task Force 54 (TF 54), screening vessels protecting the transports and cargo vessels. On 6 April, while on patrol station off Kerama Retto, she drove off an enemy aircraft that had attacked the cargo vessel SS Pierre. Three days later, the escort vessel was relieved of her escort duties off Kerama Retto to operate off the southwest coast of Okinawa.

On the 12th, a low-flying enemy aircraft closed but was driven off. At 1430, four "Val" dive-bombers approached from the south, one detached itself from the group and headed for Whitehurst and commenced a steep dive, two others also attacked, one from the starboard beam and the other from astern, this aircraft was claimed shot down. The original attacker crashed into the ship's forward superstructure on the port side of the pilothouse, penetrating bulkheads and starting fires on the bridge, while the aircraft's bomb went through the ship and exploded some 50 feet off her starboard bow.

As Whitehurst circled, out of control, the minesweeper Vigilance (AM-324), approached from a nearby sector to render assistance. By the time Vigilance had caught up with Whitehurst, her crew had put out the most serious fires, but the minesweeper proved invaluable in aiding the wounded and 21 of 23 wounded transferred to Vigilance were saved. 42 of her crew of 213 died in the attack and she moved to Kerama Retto for temporary repairs and when seaworthy reached Pearl Harbor on 10 May for repairs and alterations.

=== Post-war ===
Whitehurst departed Pearl Harbor on 25 July 1945, for the Philippine Islands. Soon after she reached Luzon, Japan surrendered. The ship supplied the city of Manila with power from August through October 1945. She was scheduled to depart Manila on 1 November, bound for Guam but a typhoon in the vicinity resulted in a two-day delay. Whitehurst reached Guam on the afternoon of 7 November.

Operating as a unit of Escort Division 40, Whitehurst supplied electrical power to the dredge YM-25 into 1946. Returning to the continental United States in April 1946, Whitehurst was decommissioned on 27 November 1946 and placed in the Atlantic Reserve Fleet at Green Cove Springs, Florida, in January 1947.

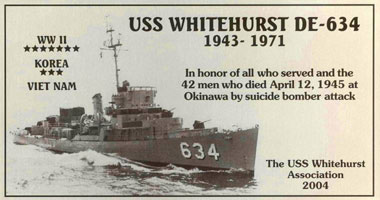
USS Whitehurst Memorial Plaque

=== Korean War ===
Reactivated in the summer of 1950 as a result of the outbreak of war in Korea, Whitehurst was recommissioned on 1 September 1950 and sailed for the Far East. The destroyer escort earned three battle stars for her activities during the Korean War between 25 February and 19 September 1951.

On 3 August 1952, Whitehurst collided with the submarine USS Bugara (SS-331) during antisubmarine warfare exercises south of Barbers Point, Oahu, Hawaii. After repairs, she returned to the Far East, where she remained until 1955, when she returned to Pearl Harbor via Midway. After working locally out of Pearl Harbor for a year, she operated between Hawaii and Guam into 1956. Early in that year, she performed surveillance duties among the islands and atolls assigned the Trust Territory of the Pacific Islands, performed search and rescue missions in the Marianas and Carolines, stopping at islands to provide medical care and record population changes.

Departing Guam on 22 February for Yokosuka, Japan, the ship sailed via the northern Marianas, the Bonins and Volcano Islands. She spent two weeks in Japanese waters before returning to Guam on 17 March. Returning to the Central Carolines for patrol duties in early April 1956, Whitehurst stood by a damaged seaplane at the island of Lamotrek for two weeks before returning to Guam on 14 April, en route to Pearl Harbor.

After a period of local operations out of Pearl Harbor, Whitehurst headed back to the Far East and touched at Guam, Formosa, Hong Kong, and Sasebo, Japan, before representing the United States Navy at the graduation ceremonies of the Republic of Korea Naval Academy on 10 April. She returned to Sasebo before shifting to Yokosuka en route to Midway and Hawaii.

== Hollywood use ==
Arriving at Pearl Harbor on 30 April 1957, Whitehurst underwent four weeks of upkeep and repairs before beginning six weeks of duty with 20th Century Fox during the filming of the World War II adventure film The Enemy Below. During that time, she portrayed the fictional destroyer escort "USS Haynes (DE-181)".

Upon completion of filming, Whitehurst operated off Oahu until September, when she was ordered to Seattle, Washington, for duty as a training ship with the 13th Naval District making an extended cruise to Guaymas, Mexico, in November 1957. After an overhaul from February to April 1958, Whitehurst returned to training duties, becoming a Group II ASW reserve ship in July. On 6 December 1958, she was transferred to the Naval Reserve and placed in an "in service" status as a unit of the Selected Reserve ASW Force.

== Reserve ASW force ==
During the 1960s, Whitehurst cruised one weekend per month and made one two-week cruise per year. In 1961, she was placed second in a battle efficiency competition among the west coast Group II Naval Reserve destroyer escorts.

Commissioned on 2 October 1961 for duty with the Pacific Fleet, Whitehurst operated with the fleet after being "called to the colors" as a result of the Berlin Crisis that autumn, she departed Seattle on the 4th, bound for her new homeport of Pearl Harbor, Hawaii.

After a period of training in the Hawaiian area, Whitehurst departed Pearl Harbor on 10 February 1962 for deployment to the Western Pacific. She operated with the 7th Fleet out of Subic Bay, Philippines, and made a goodwill visit to Sapporo, Japan. The ship also operated in the South China Sea and the Gulf of Siam.

Returning to the United States via Hawaii, Whitehurst arrived at Seattle with Charles E. Brannon (DE-446) on 17 July 1962. Subsequently, transferred back to the Naval Reserve on 1 August 1962 and placed in Group II in-service status as a Naval Reserve training ship, Whitehurst resumed operations out of Seattle. During 1963, the ship received two major changes in her configuration when her 40-mm guns and ship-to-shore power reels that enabled her to function as a floating power station, were removed.

In subsequent years, Whitehurst visited San Diego, California; Bellingham, Port Angeles, Everett, Washington; and Esquimalt, British Columbia. On 17 January 1965 while operating in the Strait of Juan de Fuca, steaming in fog off the Vancouver narrows, Whitehurst collided with the Norwegian freighter SS Hoyanger. Both ships then ran aground in shallow water. The destroyer escort suffered a five-foot gash in her stern above the waterline while the freighter had three feet of scraped bow plates. The following day, both ships were pulled off by tugs.

Whitehurst operated locally out of Seattle and ranged to San Diego and San Francisco into 1969. The ship transported astronaut Commander Richard F. Gordon, Jr. and his family from Seattle to his home town of Bremerton on 18 November before she returned to her home port.

== End of career ==
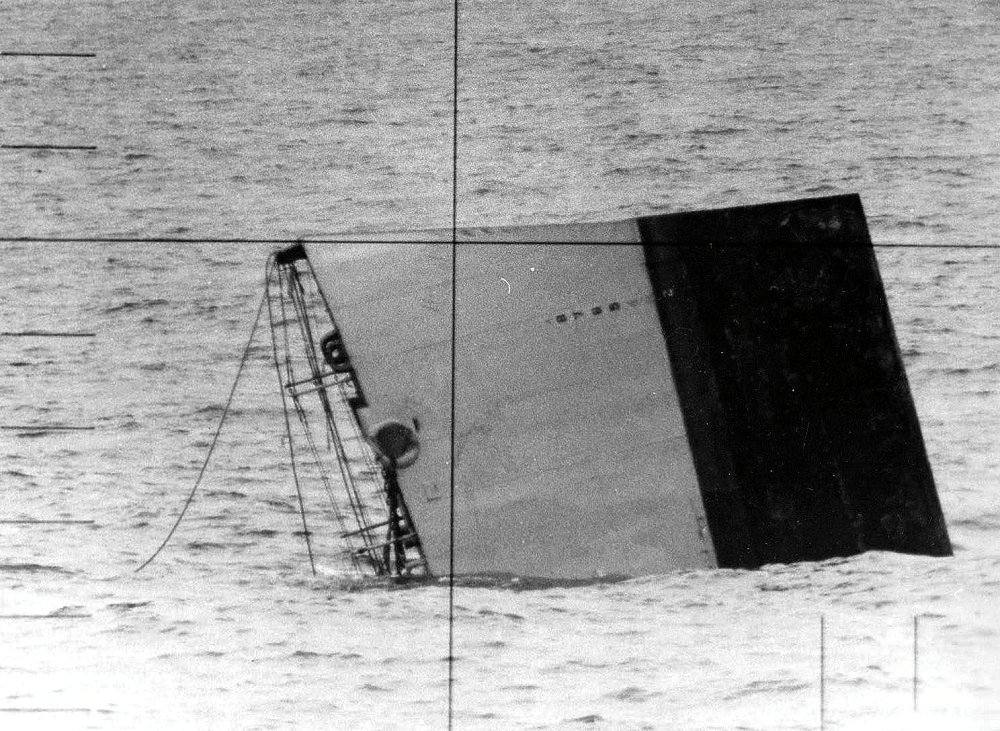
Whitehurst sinking as a target ship, 28 April 1971. Taken through the periscope of Trigger.

Whitehurst's home port was shifted to Portland, Oregon, from Seattle. The ship she replaced, McGinty (DE-365), was being deactivated as a Naval Reserve Force ship as part of an economy drive due to funding requirements for the Vietnam War and Whitehurst was soon deactivated. On 12 July 1969, she was taken out of service, struck from the Navy List and stripped of any usable equipment. She was sunk as a target by Trigger (SS-564) on 28 April 1971.

== Awards ==
- Combat Action Ribbon
- American Campaign Medal
- Asiatic-Pacific Campaign Medal with six battle stars for World War II service
- World War II Victory Medal
- National Defense Service Medal with star
- Korean Service Medal with three service stars for Korean War service
- Armed Forces Expeditionary Medal
- Philippine Liberation Medal (Republic of the Philippines)
- United Nations Korea Medal (United Nations)
- Korean War Service Medal (Republic of Korea)
