= Japanese submarine I-58 (1943) =

Imperial Japanese Navy B3 type cruiser submarine

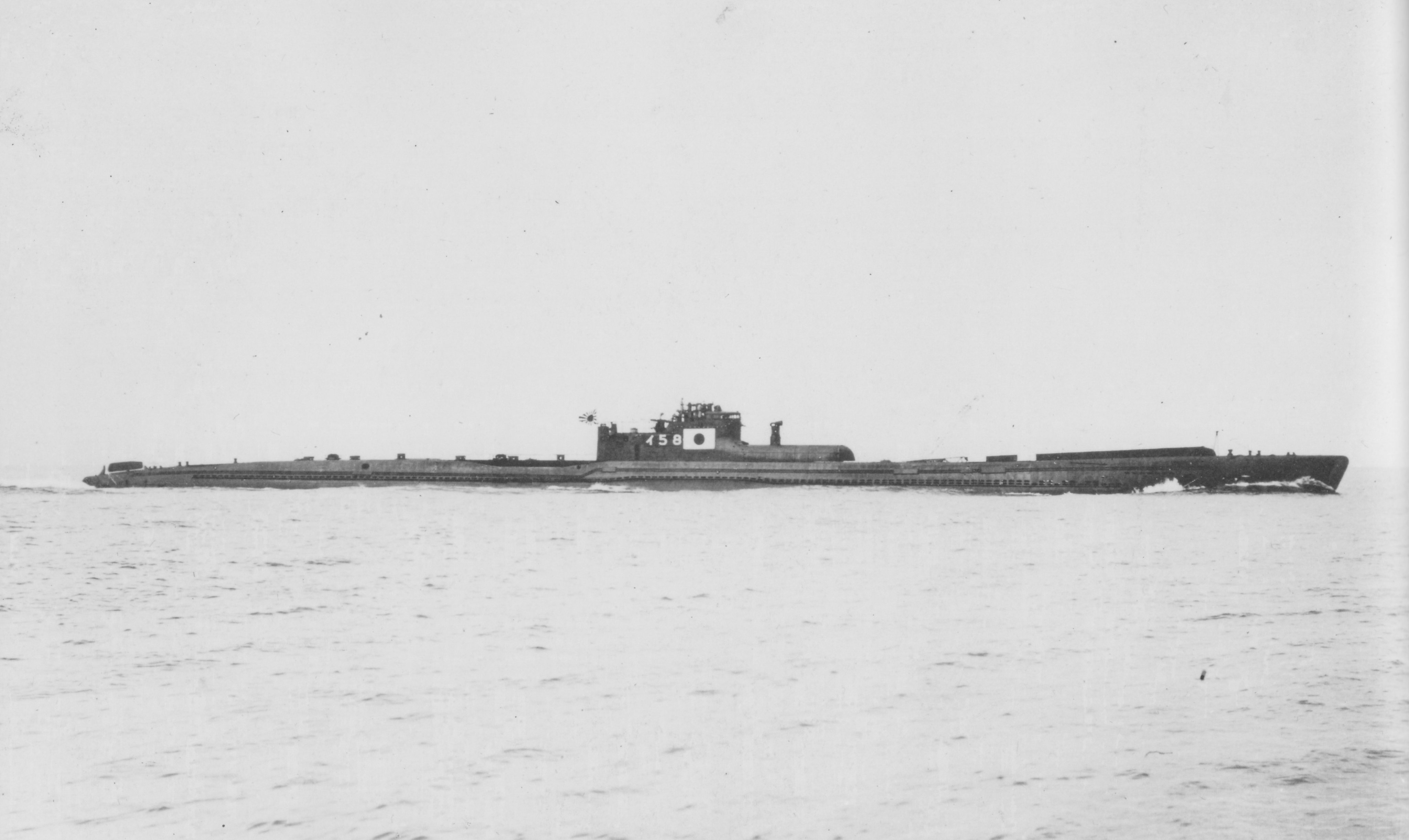
- I-58 during trials in 1944

History

Japan
- Name: I-58
- Builder: Yokosuka Naval Arsenal
- Laid down: 26 December 1942
- Launched: 9 October 1943
- Completed: 7 September 1944
- Fate: Scuttled 1 April 1946

General characteristics
- Class & type: Type B3 submarine
- Displacement: 2,140 long tons (2,174 t) standard surfaced; 3,688 long tons (3,747 t) submerged
- Length: 108.7 m (357 ft)
- Beam: 9.3 m (31 ft)
- Draft: 5.18 m (17.0 ft)
- Propulsion: 2 ×diesel engines, 4,700 hp (3,500 kW); 2 × Electric motors, 1,200 hp (890 kW)
- Speed: 17.75 knots (33 km/h) surfaced; 6.5 knots (12 km/h) submerged
- Range: 21,000 nmi (39,000 km) at 16 kn (30 km/h; 18 mph) surfaced; 105 nmi (194 km) at 3 kn (5.6 km/h; 3.5 mph) submerged
- Test depth: 100 m (330 ft)
- Boats & landing craft carried: 6 × Kaiten manned torpedoes
- Complement: 94 officers and men
- Armament: 6 × 533 mm (21 in) torpedo tubes; 23 × torpedoes; 1 x 140 mm (5.5 in) gun; 2 × Type 96 25 mm (0.98 in) AA guns
- Aircraft carried: 1 × floatplane later removed
- Aviation facilities: Hangar and launching catapult for floatplane (removed 1945)

I-58 was a Japanese B3 type cruiser submarine that served in the final year of World War II. Her only significant wartime success came with a conventional torpedo attack upon USS Indianapolis on 30 July 1945. She was modified to carry Kaiten manned torpedoes, making several attacks that inflicted minor damage in exchange for every Kaiten launched being sunk. The submarine surrendered in September 1945, and was later scuttled by the United States Navy.

== Service history ==
The submarine was laid down on 26 December 1942 at the Yokosuka Naval Arsenal, and launched on 30 June 1943. During construction her 14 cm/40 11th Year Type naval gun was removed, making room for four Kaiten manned suicide torpedoes. The submarine was completed on 7 September 1944 and command was given to Kaigun Shōsa (Lieutenant Commander) Mochitsura Hashimoto.

I-58 was assigned to the Sixth Fleet's Submarine Squadron 11 for training in the Inland Sea before being assigned to the 15th Submarine Division on 4 December 1944. A few days later she was assigned to the Kongo ("Diamond") group, with I-36, I-47, I-48, I-53 and I-56, to launch Kaiten attacks on five U.S. fleet anchorages. I-58 was assigned to attack Apra Harbor, Guam.

=== Attack on Guam ===
After a week of exercises I-58 took on fuel, provisions and torpedoes, and embarked four Kaiten and their crews, before departing Kure with I-36 on 31 December 1944. Between 03:10 and 03:27 on 12 January 1945, eleven miles (18 km) west of Apra, she launched all four Kaiten. The last Kaiten detonated immediately after launching, but at 05:30, as I-58 was leaving the area, she observed two pillars of smoke. She arrived back at Kure on 22 January 1945 and was credited with sinking an escort carrier and a large oiler, but the attack was not successful.

=== Operation Tan No. 2 ===
After the American invasion of Iwo Jima in February 1945, I-58 and I-36 joined the Shimbu group formed to counterattack American forces. She departed Kure on 1 March carrying four Kaiten. On the 7th the operation was cancelled, and two days later she was redirected to the area west of Okinotorishima to support Operation Tan No. 2, an air attack on the anchorage at Ulithi. The submarine jettisoned two Kaiten and proceeded at full speed. On 11 March I-58 was stationed off Okinotorishima to act as a radio relay ship for 24 Yokosuka P1Y "Frances" twin-engined kamikaze bombers. Only six aircraft reached Ulithi, and one crashed into the aircraft carrier USS Randolph.

=== Operation Ten-Go ===
After returning to Kure for further training, I-58 was attached to the Tatara group, with I-44, I-47 and I-56, formed to attack American shipping as part of Operation Ten-Go. I-58 was unable to penetrate the intense U.S. anti-submarine defences, and was forced to return to Kyushu on 10 April to recharge batteries. She made another attempt, but repeated attacks by enemy aircraft made any attack impossible. The submarine was ordered to an area between Okinawa and Guam on the 14th, but had no success. The operation was cancelled on the 17th, and I-58 returned to Kure on the 30th.

In May 1945 the submarine was sent to the Kure Naval Arsenal to refit. Her aircraft catapult and hangar were removed, enabling her to carry six Kaiten. She was also fitted with a snorkel. On 22 June 162 B-29s of the U.S. Twentieth Air Force bombed Kure. I-58 was undamaged, although there were several near-misses.

=== Attack on Wild Hunter and Albert T. Harris ===
I-58 was then attached to the Tamon group with I-47, I-53, I-363, I-366 and I-367, and on the evening of 18 July she sailed for an area east of the Philippines. On 28 July, 300 miles north of Palau, I-58 sighted the 6,214-ton cargo ship SS Wild Hunter, escorted by the destroyer escort USS Albert T. Harris (DE-447). Two Kaiten were launched, but Wild Hunter sighted a periscope, opened fire with her 3-inch gun, and the periscope disappeared. Harris established and maintained sonar contact with a submerged target, subsequently conducting multiple depth charge and hedgehog attacks throughout the evening of July 28 and into the morning of July 29th without apparent success before sonar contact was lost. Aboard I-58, two explosions were heard, but a rain squall prevented any visual verification. The submarine eventually surfaced, but detected no ships on radar, and reported both as sunk.

=== Sinking of Indianapolis ===
At 23:00 on 29 July 1945 I-58 surfaced 250 miles (400 km) north of Palau and headed south. Shortly afterwards the navigation officer Lt. Tanaka spotted a ship approaching from the east, making 12 knots (22 km/h; 14 mph) and not zigzagging. Lt. Cdr. Hashimoto incorrectly identified the target as an "Idaho-class battleship [sic]". She was in fact the heavy cruiser USS Indianapolis, and had sailed from Guam for Leyte the previous day, after having delivered parts and nuclear material for the Hiroshima and Nagasaki atomic bombs to Tinian from San Francisco.

I-58 submerged and prepared to attack with Type 95 torpedoes. After manoeuvering into position, at 23:26 (JST) the submarine fired a spread of six torpedoes at 2-second intervals. At 23:35, Lt. Cdr Hashimoto observed two equally spaced hits on the cruiser's starboard side. The ship stopped, listed to starboard, and was down by the bow, but Hashimoto decided to attack again and dived to 100 feet (30 m) to open the range and reload torpedo tubes. While the submarine was submerged, at 00:27 on 30 July, Indianapolis capsized and sank at 12°02′N 134°48′E. When I-58 made a periscope check, the target was gone. The submarine surfaced, and departed the area at full speed, heading north while recharging batteries.

=== Attack on Task Group 75.19 ===
On the morning of 9 August, 260 miles north east of Aparri, Luzon, I-58 sighted a zigzagging "convoy of ten transports" escorted by three destroyers, and Kaiten No.'s 4 and 5 were launched. In fact the "convoy" was the hunter-killer team Task Group 75.19 led by the escort carrier USS Salamaua, carrying out anti-submarine sweeps between Leyte and Okinawa. The destroyer escort USS Johnnie Hutchins sighted and attacked Kaiten No.5 with her guns, and then attacked Kaiten No.4 with depth charges. Kaiten No.5 was sunk by fire from her 5-inch stern gun. Kaiten No.4 was sighted again over an hour later and again attacked with depth charges which resulted in a violent explosion, throwing water 30 feet (9.1 m) into the air. According to Hashimoto, the previously sighted destroyer had disappeared. He headed northwards to evade pursuit. The crew of Johnnie Hutchins were later awarded the Navy Unit Commendation.

=== Attack on Oak Hill and Thomas F. Nickel ===
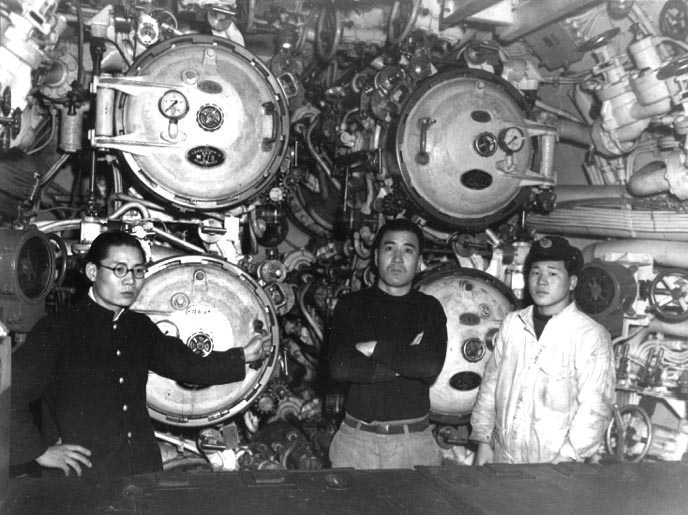
The forward torpedo room of I-58 while at Sasebo in 1946 just before the submarine was scuttled.

Around 17:00 on 12 August 1945, 360 miles south-east of Okinawa, while I-58 was running northwards on the surface at 12 knots (22 km/h; 14 mph), her Type 3 radar detected multiple targets. Soon after ships were sighted on the horizon. The submarine dove, and at 17:16, the crew sighted what they believed to be a seaplane carrier escorted by a destroyer. In reality, the "seaplane carrier" was the dock landing ship USS Oak Hill, escorted by USS Thomas F. Nickel en route from Okinawa to Leyte. At 18:26, Oak Hill sighted a periscope, and Nickel attacked at flank speed. Nickel fired depth charges, and attempted to ram, sustaining minor damage to her hull. A Kaiten broke surface astern of Oak Hill and exploded. Half an hour later Nickel sighted another periscope astern of Oak Hill, and fired depth charges. An explosion followed, throwing a black geyser of oil and water 50 feet (15 m) into the air. An oil slick was also sighted.

=== The end of the war ===
On 18 August I-58, arrived back at Kure. On 2 September Japan surrendered. On 1 April 1946 in "Operation Road's End" I-58, stripped of all usable equipment and material, was towed from Sasebo to an area off the Gotō Islands by the submarine tender USS Nereus and scuttled at 32°37′N 129°17′E.

=== Wreck discovery ===
On 25 May 2017, sonar images revealed the nearly 60-metre (200 ft)-long section of the submarine, vertically on the seafloor 200 metres (660 ft) deep. Plans called for a submersible to be deployed to confirm identity. The submarine, heavily encrusted with marine life, was positively identified as I-58 on 7 September 2017, by its rudder.
