= USS Richard M. Rowell =

John C. Butler-class destroyer escort

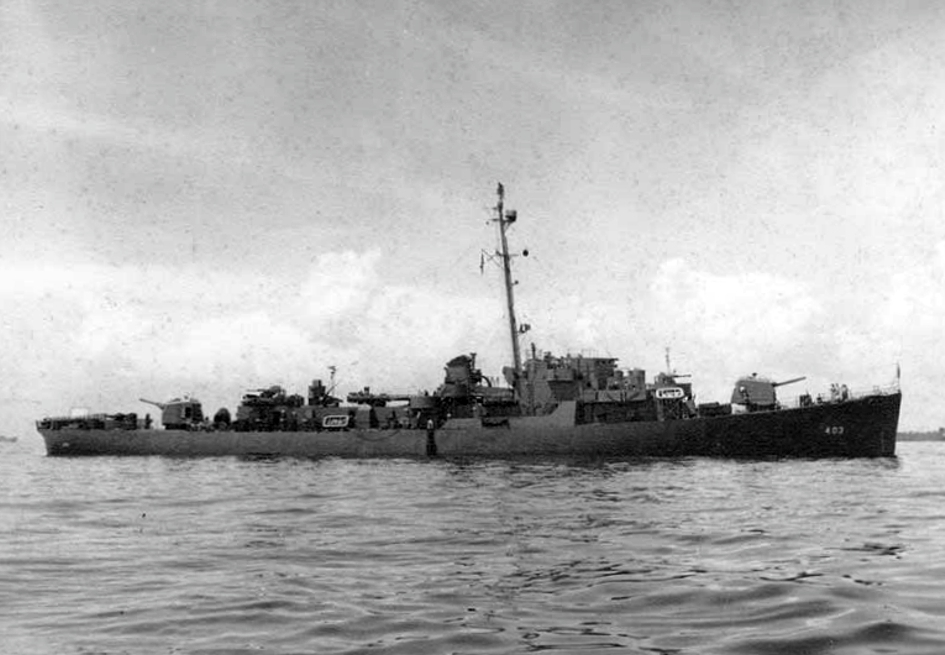
- USS Richard M. Rowell c. September 1945

History

United States
- Name: Richard M. Rowell
- Laid down: 18 August 1943
- Launched: 17 November 1943
- Commissioned: 9 March 1944
- Decommissioned: 2 July 1946
- Stricken: 30 June 1968
- Honours and awards: 6 battle stars
- Fate: Sold for scrapping, June 1969

General characteristics
- Class & type: John C. Butler-class destroyer escort; WGT (geared-turbine drive, 5" guns)
- Displacement: 1,350 long tons (1,372 t)
- Length: 306 ft (93 m), overall
- Beam: 36 ft 10 in (11.23 m)
- Draft: 13 ft 4 in (4.06 m) (max)
- Propulsion: 2 boilers, 2 geared steam turbines, 12,000 shp (8,900 kW), 2 screws
- Speed: 24 knots (44 km/h; 28 mph)
- Range: 6,000 nautical miles (11,000 km) at 12 knots (22 km/h)
- Complement: 14 officers, 201 enlisted
- Armament: 2 5 in (127 mm) DP guns, 4 (2×2) 40 mm AA guns, 10 20 mm cannon, 3 21 in (533 mm) torpedo tubes, 1 Hedgehog projector, 2 depth charge tracks, 8 K-gun depth charge projectors

USS Richard M. Rowell (DE-403) was a John C. Butler-class destroyer escort acquired by the United States Navy during World War II. The primary purpose of the destroyer escort was to escort and protect ships in convoy, in addition to other tasks as assigned, such as patrol or radar picket. During her career she earned six battle stars to her credit.

== Namesake ==
Richard Merrill Rowell was born on 6 August 1916 in Sonoma, California. He enlisted in the U.S. Naval Reserve on 8 August 1939, he was commissioned Ensign on 20 August 1940. He reported for duty as a fighter pilot to USS Lexington on 5 November 1940. He received the Distinguished Flying Cross for downing a Japanese plane 20 February 1942. During the Battle of the Coral Sea 7 to 8 May 1942, he won a gold star in lieu of a second Distinguished Flying Cross, before failing to return from his last mission.

== Construction and commissioning ==
The ship's keel was laid down 18 August 1943 by Brown Shipbuilding Co. at their yard in Houston, Texas; Launched on 17 November 1943, sponsored by Mrs. Agnes M. Rowell, the ship was commissioned on 9 March 1944.

== History ==
=== World War II ===
Following shakedown off Bermuda, Richard M. Rowell departed Boston, Massachusetts on 6 May 1944 and proceeded via the Panama Canal and San Diego, California to Pearl Harbor, arriving there on 31 May. In July 1944 she escorted a convoy to Eniwetok and screened escort carriers returning to Pearl Harbor. In August she protected a transport group on its voyage to Tulagi, Solomons, and screened escort carriers to Manus. In September she protected an air support task force during the landings on Morotai on 15 September, saving two pilots.

Richard M. Rowell rescued survivors from the destroyer escort Shelton, which had been hit by a torpedo from the Japanese submarine Ro-41 on 3 October 1944. Later that day, thinking she was attacking the culprit of the Shelton attack, she mistakenly attacked USS Seawolf in a submarine safety lane and sank her. Richard M. Rowell next screened a carrier group providing air support for the landings on Leyte, Philippine Islands on 20 October.

On 23 October, Richard M. Rowell sank the Type-B Mod.2 class Japanese submarine I-54. She then took part in the Battle off Samar. On 25 October, Richard M. Rowell was a member of the escort of Taffy One, which was operating off Surigao Island about 130 miles (210 km) south of Task Force 3, which was the subject of the main Japanese attack. Taffy One had just launched planes to the south to attack the Japanese retiring from the Battle of Surigao Strait, when she was subjected to a kamikaze attack by six Japanese planes from Davao. Responding to this emergency, Richard M. Rowell rescued one survivor from the escort carrier Santee. Taffy One arrived too late to be of much assistance to Taffy 3, which bore the brunt of the Japanese attack; Richard M. Rowell did fight off another kamikaze attack on 26 October. Returning to the carrier formation, she donated blood plasma from her own supply, and medical supplies from USS Petrof Bay, to Suwanee. On 27 October, Richard M. Rowell escorted Santee to Manus, and arrived at Pearl Harbor on 19 November.

She joined anti-air- and ASW patrols for the landings 9 January 1945 at Lingayen Gulf, Luzon, Philippine Islands. After protecting underwater demolition drills at Ulithi in late January and early February, she guarded transports to Iwo Jima, and supported air units during the landings there on 19 February. Departing Ulithi on 21 March, she protected air units during the landings on 1 April upon Okinawa, before returning to Guam on 11 May. In July she patrolled in Leyte Gulf, Philippine Islands, and escorted the escort carrier Hoggatt Bay to Ulithi, before escorting three transports to San Pedro Bay, Philippine Islands, in August. Following duty at Leyte Gulf and Okinawa in September, she proceeded via Eniwetok and Pearl Harbor to San Diego, arriving 6 November.

=== Sinking of USS Seawolf ===
Seawolf and Narwhal exchanged radar recognition signals at 0756 on 3 October in the Morotai area. Shortly thereafter, a 7th Fleet task group was attacked by Ro-41. The destroyer escort Shelton was torpedoed and sunk, and Richard M. Rowell began to search for the enemy.

Since there were four friendly submarines in the vicinity of this attack, they were directed to give their positions and the other three did, but Seawolf was not heard from. On 4 October, Seawolf again was directed to report her position, and again she failed to do so. One of two planes from the escort carrier Midway sighted a submarine submerging and dropped two bombs on it even though it was in a safety zone for American submarines. The site was marked by dye. Rowell's commanding officer knew he was in a safety lane, but, having failed to get word Seawolf was behind schedule, believed there was no U.S. submarine nearby and chose to attack. Rowell established sonar contact on the submarine, which then sent a series of dashes and dots which Rowell stated bore no resemblance to the existing recognition signals. Believing this an attempt to jam her sonar, Rowell attacked with Hedgehog. The second attack was followed by underwater explosions, and debris rose to the surface.

Post-war examination of Japanese records shows no attack listed that could account for the loss of Seawolf. While it is possible Seawolf was lost to an operational casualty or as a result of an unrecorded enemy attack, it is more likely she was sunk by friendly fire. 83 officers and men as well as 17 Army passengers were lost. She was the thirty-fourth U.S. submarine lost in the Pacific War, the second (after Dorado in the Caribbean) to friendly fire. One of the Army passengers was Captain Howell S. Kopp, an Alamo Scout. Kopp was en route to an undisclosed location in the Philippines to conduct a clandestine mission in support of the upcoming Allied landing on Leyte.

=== Post-war decommissioning ===
Decommissioned on 2 July 1946, Richard M. Rowell remained in the Pacific Reserve Fleet until stricken from the Navy list on 30 June 1968. In June 1969, she was sold for scrapping.

== Awards ==
Richard M. Rowell received six battle stars for World War II service.
