= Japanese submarine I-45 =

- I-45 during sea trials off Sasebo, 29 December 1943.

History

Japan
- Name: Submarine No. 375
- Builder: Sasebo Naval Arsenal, Sasebo, Japan
- Laid down: 15 July 1942
- Renamed: I-45 on 5 February 1943
- Launched: 6 March 1943
- Completed: 28 December 1943
- Commissioned: 28 December 1943
- Fate: Sunk 29 October 1944
- Stricken: 10 March 1945

General characteristics
- Class & type: Type B2 submarine
- Displacement: 2,624 tons surfaced; 3,700 tons submerged
- Length: 356.5 ft (108.7 m)
- Beam: 30.5 ft (9.3 m)
- Draft: 17 ft (5.2 m)
- Propulsion: 2 diesels: 11,000 hp (8,200 kW); Electric motors: 2,000 hp (1,500 kW)
- Speed: 23.5 knots (43.5 km/h) surfaced; 8 knots (15 km/h) submerged
- Range: 14,000 nautical miles (26,000 km) at 16 knots (30 km/h)
- Test depth: 100 m (330 ft)
- Complement: 114
- Armament: 6 × 533 mm (21 in) forward torpedo tubes; 17 torpedoes; 1 × 14 cm (5.5 in) deck gun (removed October–February 1945); 6 × kaiten suicide attack torpedoes (added October–February 1945)
- Aircraft carried: 1 x floatplane (removed October–February 1945)
- Aviation facilities: Hangar and catapult (removed October–February 1945)

I-45 was an Imperial Japanese Navy Type B2 submarine. Completed and commissioned in December 1943, she served in World War II, patrolling in the Pacific Ocean and taking part in the Marianas campaign, the Philippines campaign, and the Battle of Leyte Gulf before she was sunk in October 1944; sinking the destroyer escort USS Eversole in exchange.

== Construction and commissioning ==
I-45 was laid down on 15 July 1942 by the Sasebo Naval Arsenal at Sasebo, Japan, with the name Submarine No. 375. On 5 February 1943, she was renamed I-45 and provisionally attached to the Yokosuka Naval District. She was launched on 6 March 1943 and completed and commissioned on 28 December 1943.

== Service history ==
Upon commissioning, I-45 was attached formally to the Yokosuka Naval District and was assigned to Submarine Squadron 11 for workups in the Iyo-nada in the Seto Inland Sea. She called at the Tokuyama Fuel Depot from 22 to 23 February 1944 to refuel.

=== First war patrol ===
On 25 March 1944, I-45 was reassigned to Submarine Division 15 in the 6th Fleet. She departed Kure, Japan, that day to begin her first war patrol, assigned a patrol area in the Pacific Ocean east of the Marshall Islands.

Alerted by Ultra intelligence information to the operations of I-45 and the submarines I-16, I-36, and I-38 between the Marshalls and Hawaii, United States Pacific Fleet Headquarters organized Task Group 11.1 — a United States Navy hunter-killer group consisting of the escort aircraft carrier USS Altamaha and the destroyer escorts USS Cabana, USS Elden, USS Harold C. Thomas, and USS Wileman — on 30 March 1944 to find and sink them. The group's first success against the submarines came at 14:08 on 4 April 1944, when a TBM-1C Avenger torpedo bomber and an FM-2 Wildcat fighter of Composite Squadron 66 (VC-66) from Altamaha flying 108 nautical miles (200 km; 124 mi) west of the carrier spotted I-45 on the surface recharging her batteries 650 nautical miles (1,200 km; 750 mi) northeast of Majuro. While the Wildcat strafed I-45, the Avenger attacked her with rockets and depth charges. I-45 suffered a direct hit on her stern and developed a serious leak. I-45′s commanding officer ordered her to go to full speed astern and dive. The aircraft crews last saw I-45 settling in a large oil slick with no forward momentum and received credit for sinking a submarine. I-45, meanwhile, submerged. When her commanding officer then ordered full speed ahead, her crew lost control of her and she began a rotating dive. She reached 490 feet (149 m) before her crew could stop her descent, and she finally stabilized at 330 feet (101 m).

Although she survived the attack, I-45 had suffered heavy damage, forcing her to return to Japan. She reached Yokosuka, Japan, on 15 April 1944 and in late April began repairs at Kure Naval Arsenal at Kure which lasted until late May 1944.

=== Marianas campaign ===
On 12 June 1944, U.S. landings on Saipan began both the Battle of Saipan and the Marianas campaign, and on 13 June the commander-in-chief of the Combined Fleet, Admiral Soemu Toyoda, activated Operation A-Go for the defense of the Mariana Islands. On 28 June 1944, I-45 departed Yokosuka in company with the submarine I-55 bound for Tinian in the Marianas and carrying an Unkato cargo container — a 135-foot (41.1 m) submersible cargo container that could carry up to 377 tons of supplies, designed for a one-way trip in which the cargo's recipients released, recovered, and unloaded it — loaded with weapons and ammunition. Encountering heavy seas during her voyage, she was redirected to Guam to pick up Imperial Japanese Navy Air Service pilots who were stranded there. She attempted to contact Japanese forces ashore on Guam on both 14 and 16 July 1944 to deliver her Unkato and pick up the airmen, but failed on each occasion because of a communications mix-up. After the second failure, she dumped the Unkato container overboard and headed back to Japan. She arrived at Yokosuka on 27 July 1944, and later moved to Kure.

=== Second war patrol ===
The commander-in-chief of the Combined Fleet, Admiral Soemu Toyoda, activated Operation Shō-Gō 1 for the defense of the Philippine Islands on 13 October 1944. I-45 departed Kure on the same day to begin her second war patrol, assigned a patrol area in the Philippine Sea. U.S. forces landed on Leyte in the Philippines on 20 October 1944, beginning both the Battle of Leyte and the Philippines campaign, and the Japanese naval reaction to the invasion resulted in the Battle of Leyte Gulf of 23–26 October 1944. On 24 October 1944, the second day of the battle, I-45 and the submarines I-26, I-37, I-53, I-54, and I-56 were designated Submarine Group A under the direct command of the commander-in-chief of the 6th Fleet, Vice Admiral Shigeyoshi Miwa, and I-45 received orders to move to patrol station "Re" off the northeast coast of Mindanao.

=== Loss ===
On 29 October 1944, the destroyer escorts USS Eversole and USS Richard S. Bull were in the Philippine Sea steaming from San Pedro Bay in the Philippines to rejoin Task Unit 77.7.1 when Eversole picked up a doubtful sonar contact 60 nautical miles (110 km; 69 mi) east of Dinagat Island at 02:10. She soon lost the contact, but at 02:28, two torpedoes struck her, causing her to lose all power and take on a 30-degree list. Her crew began to abandon ship at 02:40, and in less than 15 minutes Eversole sank stern-first at 10°18′N 127°37′E. I-45 surfaced at around 03:00 and circled the site of the sinking, briefly opening fire on survivors in the water with her Type 96 25 mm antiaircraft gun. She dived at around 03:20.

At 03:25 a large underwater explosion occurred, apparently from the sunken Eversole, killing about 30 survivors in the water and injuring others. The explosion alerted Richard S. Bull, which arrived on the scene and began a rescue operation while the destroyer escort USS Whitehurst, which had been detached from the screen of a passing fleet oiler unit, provided antisubmarine cover. By 06:30, Richard S. Bull had pulled the last of 139 survivors from the water, three of whom later died. Including them, Eversole′s crew suffered 77 dead in the sinking.

Meanwhile, at 05:45 Whitehurst detected a submerged submarine — probably I-45 — on sonar 85 nautical miles (157 km; 98 mi) northeast of Siargao, about 50 nautical miles (93 km; 58 mi) from the site of Eversole′s sinking. After Whitehurst made three unsuccessful Hedgehog attacks, the submarine — which Whitehurst′s commanding officer later described as displaying "excellent evasive tactics and maneuverability," continually turning away from attacks and presenting her stern and wake to Whitehurst — tried to escape at a depth of 225 feet (69 m). At 06:48, Whitehurst conducted a fourth Hedgehog attack, which this time resulted in five or six small explosions, followed by a large underwater explosion that disabled Whitehurst′s sound gear and heavy rumbling noises. Whitehurst resumed her search for the submarine at 07:20 and noted a large amount of oil on the surface as well as wood and other debris, some of which her motor whaleboat recovered. She suspended her search at 12:15. The explosions, oil, and debris marked the sinking of the submarine, presumably I-45, at 10°10′N 127°28′E.

The 6th Fleet issued orders to I-45 on 5 November 1944 to move to a new patrol area east of Lamon Bay, but she never acknowledged them. On 2 December 1944, the Imperial Japanese Navy declared I-45 to be presumed lost off the Philippines with the loss of all 104 men aboard. She was stricken from the Navy list on 10 March 1945.

== Sources ==
- Hackett, Bob & Kingsepp, Sander. IJN Submarine I-45: Tabular Record of Movement. Retrieved on September 16, 2020.
