= Japanese submarine Ro-49 =

Kaichū-type submarine

History

Japan
- Name: Submarine No. 390
- Builder: Mitsui Zosensho, Tamano, Japan
- Laid down: 16 November 1942
- Renamed: Ro-49 on 31 July 1943
- Launched: 3 August 1943
- Completed: 19 May 1944
- Commissioned: 19 May 1944
- Fate: Missing after 25 March 1945; Possibly sunk 5 April 1945
- Stricken: 25 May 1945

General characteristics
- Class & type: Kaichū type submarine (K6 subclass)
- Displacement: 1,133 tonnes (1,115 long tons) surfaced; 1,470 tonnes (1,447 long tons) submerged
- Length: 80.5 m (264 ft 1 in) overall
- Beam: 7 m (23 ft 0 in)
- Draft: 4.07 m (13 ft 4 in)
- Installed power: 4,200 bhp (3,100 kW) (diesel); 1,200 hp (890 kW) (electric motor)
- Propulsion: Diesel-electric; 1 × diesel engine; 1 × electric motor
- Speed: 19.75 knots (36.58 km/h; 22.73 mph) surfaced; 8 knots (15 km/h; 9.2 mph) submerged
- Range: 5,000 nmi (9,300 km; 5,800 mi) at 16 knots (30 km/h; 18 mph) surfaced; 45 nmi (83 km; 52 mi) at 5 knots (9.3 km/h; 5.8 mph) submerged
- Test depth: 80 m (260 ft)
- Crew: 61
- Armament: 4 × bow 533 mm (21 in) torpedo tubes; 1 × 76.2 mm (3.00 in) L/40 anti-aircraft gun; 2 × single 25 mm (1.0 in) AA guns

Ro-49 was an Imperial Japanese Navy Kaichū type submarine of the K6 sub-class. Completed and commissioned in May 1944, she served in World War II and patrolled off the Philippines and the Ryukyu Islands. She was lost during her third war patrol sometime in late March or April 1945.

== Design and description ==
The submarines of the K6 sub-class were versions of the preceding K5 sub-class with greater range and diving depth. They displaced 1,133 tonnes (1,115 long tons) surfaced and 1,470 tonnes (1,447 long tons) submerged. The submarines were 80.5 meters (264 ft 1 in) long, had a beam of 7 meters (23 ft 0 in) and a draft of 4.07 meters (13 ft 4 in). They had a diving depth of 80 meters (260 ft).

For surface running, the boats were powered by two 2,100-brake-horsepower (1,566 kW) diesel engines, each driving one propeller shaft. When submerged each propeller was driven by a 600-horsepower (447 kW) electric motor. They could reach 19.75 knots (36.58 km/h; 22.73 mph) on the surface and 8 knots (15 km/h; 9.2 mph) underwater. On the surface, the K6s had a range of 11,000 nautical miles (20,000 km; 13,000 mi) at 12 knots (22 km/h; 14 mph); submerged, they had a range of 45 nmi (83 km; 52 mi) at 5 knots (9.3 km/h; 5.8 mph).

The boats were armed with four internal bow 53.3 cm (21.0 in) torpedo tubes and carried a total of ten torpedoes. They were also armed with a single 76.2 mm (3.00 in) L/40 anti-aircraft gun and two single 25 mm (1.0 in) AA guns.

== Construction and commissioning ==
Ro-49 was laid down on 16 November 1942 by Mitsui Zosensho at Tamano, Japan, as Submarine No. 390. She was named Ro-49 on 31 July 1943 and was attached provisionally to the Maizuru Naval District that day. Launched on 3 August 1943, she was completed and commissioned on 19 May 1944.

== Service history ==
Upon commissioning, Ro-49 was attached formally to the Maizuru Naval District and assigned to Submarine Squadron 33 for workups. In mid-July 1944, she and the submarine I-157 took part in tests of a submarine version of the Type 13 air-search radar. She was reassigned to Submarine Squadron 11 on 15 August 1944 and then to Submarine Division 34 in the 6th Fleet on 10 November 1944.

=== First war patrol ===
On 16 November 1944, Ro-49 departed Kure, Japan, to begin her first war patrol, assigned a patrol area in the Philippine Sea east of Luzon in the Philippine Islands. Her hydrophone suffered damage in rough seas, and on 28 November 1944 her commanding officer decided to return to Japan. She returned to Kure on 7 December 1944.

=== Second war patrol ===
Ro-49 set out from Kure on 1 January 1945 to begin her second war patrol, again in the Philippine Sea east of the Philippines. On 4 January 1945, she received new orders to patrol in the South China Sea west of Luzon. U.S. forces entered Lingayen Gulf and U.S. forces began their invasion of Luzon on 9 January 1945. Ro-49 was in the South China Sea 55 nautical miles (102 km; 63 mi) west-northwest of Iba on Luzon on 12 January 1945 when she sighted two escort aircraft carriers and three battleships with a strong escort. She attacked and her commanding officer reported that she sank what he described as an "Idaho-class" battleship, but her claim of hitting a battleship was disproven after World War II. On 21 January 1945 he received an order to return to Kure, which she reached on 1 February 1945. She moved to Saeki on 16 March 1945.

=== Third war patrol ===
On 18 March 1945, Ro-49 got underway from Saeki for her third war patrol, assigned a patrol area southeast of the Ryukyu Islands. After she sent a routine situation report on 25 March 1945, the Japanese never heard from her again.

=== Loss ===
On 26 March 1945, a Japanese submarine attacked United States Navy Task Group 54.3 off the Ryukyus. At 09:32, the heavy cruiser USS Wichita (CA-45) sighted a periscope to starboard, and she made an emergency turn to starboard to evade a torpedo. The light cruiser USS St. Louis (CL-49) also sighted torpedo wakes. The attacking submarine scored no hits but escaped without facing a counterattack by the cruisers′ escorts. The identity of the attacking submarine remains unknown, although historians have attributed the attack both to Ro-49 and to a Type C Kō-hyōteki-class midget submarine, in the latter case also claiming that the attack took place on 27 March 1945.

On 5 April 1945, the destroyer USS Hudson (DD-475) was on radar picket duty off Kume Island near Okinawa when she received a signal from the support landing craft USS LCS-115 reporting the sighting of a submarine. While the submarine was on the surface, Hudson detected it on radar at 0345. Hudson closed the range and fired a star shell to illuminate the area, and the submarine dived, causing it to disappear from Hudson′s radar. However, Hudson established sonar contact on the submerged submarine and made six depth-charge attacks over the next six hours, sinking the submarine at 26°22′N 126°30′E.

The identity of the submarine Hudson sank remains unclear. It could have been Ro-49. Some Japanese sources claim that Ro-49 was already missing by 5 April 1945 and that Hudson sank the submarine I-56, although I-56 might have been sunk on 18 April 1945 instead. Some accounts claim that the submarine USS Lagarto (SS-371) sank Ro-49 in the Bungo Strait on 24 February 1945, but Ro-49 was active for at least a month after that date.

On 15 April 1945, the Imperial Japanese Navy declared Ro-49 to be presumed lost southeast of Okinawa with all 79 men on board. She was stricken from the Navy list on 25 May 1945.
