= John T. Eversole =

United States Navy officer (1915–1942)

John Thomas Eversole
- Born: April 17, 1915; Pocatello, Idaho, US
- Died: June 4, 1942 (aged 27) near Midway Atoll
- Military career
- Allegiance: United States
- Branch: USN
- Rank: Lieutenant (junior grade)
- Unit: Torpedo Squadron 6 (VT-6)
- Conflicts: World War II; *Battle of Midway
- Awards: Navy Cross (posthumous)

John Thomas Eversole (April 17, 1915 – June 4, 1942) graduated from the United States Naval Academy in 1938, and after duty at sea received aviation training. On May 7, 1941, Eversole joined Torpedo Squadron 6 (VT-6) in USS Enterprise (CV-6), and with many others of his squadron, died in the opening phases of the Battle of Midway 4 June 1942 during an attack on Japanese carriers made through heavy opposition. Lieutenant (junior grade) Eversole's actions were posthumously recognized with the award of the Navy Cross.

On February 18, 1942, Eversole had to ditch his TBD Devastator torpedo bomber sixty miles from the Enterprise, after he became disoriented and ran out of fuel. He was successfully picked up by one of his Task Forces destroyers the next day.

== Namesake ==
The destroyer escort USS Eversole (DE-404) was the first ship named in his honor. She was sunk during The Battle of Leyte Gulf on March 21, 1944. In 1946 a second ship, the destroyer USS Eversole (DD-789) was named in his honor.
