= Japanese submarine I-54 (1943) =

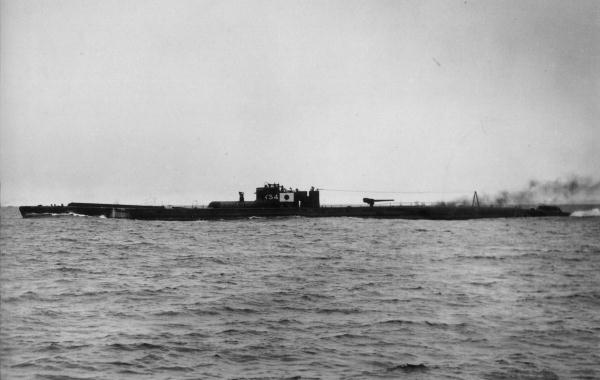
- I-54 during trials in Tokyo Bay, ca. February 1944.

History

Japan
- Name: Submarine No. 627
- Builder: Yokosuka Naval Arsenal, Yokosuka, Japan
- Laid down: 1 July 1942
- Launched: 4 May 1943
- Renamed: I-54 on 4 May 1943
- Completed: 31 March 1944
- Commissioned: 31 March 1944
- Fate: Missing after 23 October 1944; Possibly sunk 28 October 1944
- Stricken: 10 March 1945

General characteristics
- Class & type: Type B3 submarine
- Displacement: 2,140 long tons (2,174 t) surfaced; 3,688 long tons (3,747 t) submerged
- Length: 108.7 m (357 ft)
- Beam: 9.3 m (31 ft)
- Draft: 5.19 m (17.0 ft)
- Propulsion: 2 × Kampon Mk.22 diesel engines, 4,700 hp (3,500 kW); 2 × Electric motors, 1,200 hp (890 kW)
- Speed: 17.7 knots (33 km/h) surfaced; 6.5 knots (12 km/h) submerged
- Range: 21,000 nmi (39,000 km) at 16 kn (30 km/h; 18 mph) surfaced; 105 nmi (194 km) at 3 kn (5.6 km/h; 3.5 mph) submerged
- Test depth: 100 m (328 ft)
- Complement: 94 officers and men
- Armament: 6 × 533 mm (21 in) torpedo tubes; 19 × Type 95 torpedoes; 2 × Type 96 25 mm (0.98 in) AA guns
- Aircraft carried: 1 × floatplane
- Aviation facilities: Hangar and catapult

The second I-54 was an Imperial Japanese Navy Type B3 submarine. Completed and commissioned in March 1944, she served in World War II and took part in the Marianas campaign and the Philippines campaign before she was sunk in October 1944.

== Construction and commissioning ==
I-54 was laid down on 1 July 1942 by the Yokosuka Naval Arsenal at Yokosuka, Japan, with the name Submarine No. 627. Launched on 4 May 1943, and on the same day was both renamed I-54, the second submarine of the name, and provisionally attached to the Kure Naval District. She was completed and commissioned on 31 March 1944.

== Service history ==
Upon commissioning, I-54 was attached formally to the Kure Naval District and assigned to Submarine Squadron 11 in the 6th Fleet for workups.

=== Marianas campaign ===
The commander-in-chief of the Combined Fleet, Admiral Soemu Toyoda, activated Operation A-Go for the defense of the Mariana Islands on 13 June 1944. The Marianas campaign began with the U.S. landings on Saipan on 15 June 1944.

I-54 departed Yokosuka on 7 July 1944, bound for Saipan towing an Unpoto gun carrier, a 70-foot (21.3 m) sled that could carry up to 15 tons of cargo, usually in the form of three Type 96 15-centimeter (5.9 in) howitzers and ammunition for them. Fleet Radio Unit, Melbourne (FRUMEL), an Allied signals intelligence unit headquartered in Melbourne, Australia, intercepted and decrypted a Japanese message that day stating that I-54 was due to arrive at Tinian on 14 July 1944 to evacuate Imperial Japanese Navy Air Service personnel. Saipan fell to American forces on 9 July 1944, and I-54 was ordered to nearby Tinian that day. She lost her Unpoto sled in heavy seas. On 10 July 1944, she was reassigned to Submarine Division 15 in the 6th Fleet. On 15 July, FRUMEL intercepted and decrypted another Japanese message saying that I-54 was scheduled to arrive at Tinian on 18 July. She returned to Yokosuka on 24 July 1944.

=== Philippines campaign ===
Toyoda activated Operation Shō-Gō 1 for the defense of the Philippine Islands on 13 October 1944. That day, I-54 was assigned along with the submarines I-26, I-45, I-53, and I-56 to Submarine Group A under the direct command of the 6th Fleet. She departed Kure on 15 October 1944 with orders to attack the aircraft carriers of United States Navy Task Force 38 and the crippled light cruiser USS Houston (CL-81).

On 18 October 1944, I-54 received orders from the 6th Fleet to join 12 other submarines in patrolling east of Leyte in the Philippines. I-54 was assigned a patrol area 120 nautical miles (220 km; 140 mi) east of the Philippines between the areas assigned to the submarines I-38 and I-46, and she was expected to arrive in her patrol area on 25 October 1944.

The Battle of Leyte began with the U.S. landings on Leyte on 20 October 1944, and that day I-54 acknowledged an order to change her patrol area. She transmitted another message on 23 October 1944, the first day of the Battle of Leyte Gulf of 23–26 October 1944. The Japanese never heard from her again.

=== Loss ===
The circumstances of I-54′s loss remain unknown. At 12:18 on 28 October 1944, the destroyers USS Gridley (DD-380) and USS Helm (DD-388) detected a submarine attempting to penetrate the screen of United States Navy Task Group 38.4 — which included the aircraft carriers USS Enterprise (CV-6), USS Franklin (CV-13), USS Belleau Wood (CVL-24), and USS San Jacinto (CVL-30) — east of Leyte. While the aircraft carriers steered away from the submarine contact at high speed, Gridley made three depth charge attacks against the submarine and Helm made four. After Helm′s fourth attack, which took place at 14:11, a large explosion followed by two smaller ones occurred. Oil and air bubbles appeared on the surface, and damaged deck planking and human remains were recovered after the attack. The submarine sank at 10°58′N 127°13′E.

On both 30 October and 1 November 1944, I-26, I-46, and I-54 all failed to make scheduled daily 19:00 status reports. On 20 November 1944, the Imperial Japanese Navy declared I-54 to be presumed lost east of the Philippines with the loss of all 107 men on board. She was stricken from the Navy list on 10 March 1945.

The identity of the submarine Gridley and Helm sank remains a mystery, and has been reported both as I-46 and I-54. Some sources have credited the destroyer escort USS Richard M. Rowell (DE-403) with sinking I-54 in the Philippine Sea on 26 October 1944 while screening Task Group 77.4, although the submarine Richard M. Rowell attacked probably was I-56, which survived.

== Sources ==
- Hackett, Bob & Kingsepp, Sander. IJN Submarine I-54: Tabular Record of Movement. Retrieved on September 15, 2020.
