= USS Eversole (DD-789) =

Gearing-class destroyer

Coordinates: 40.7600877°N 29.9167693°E

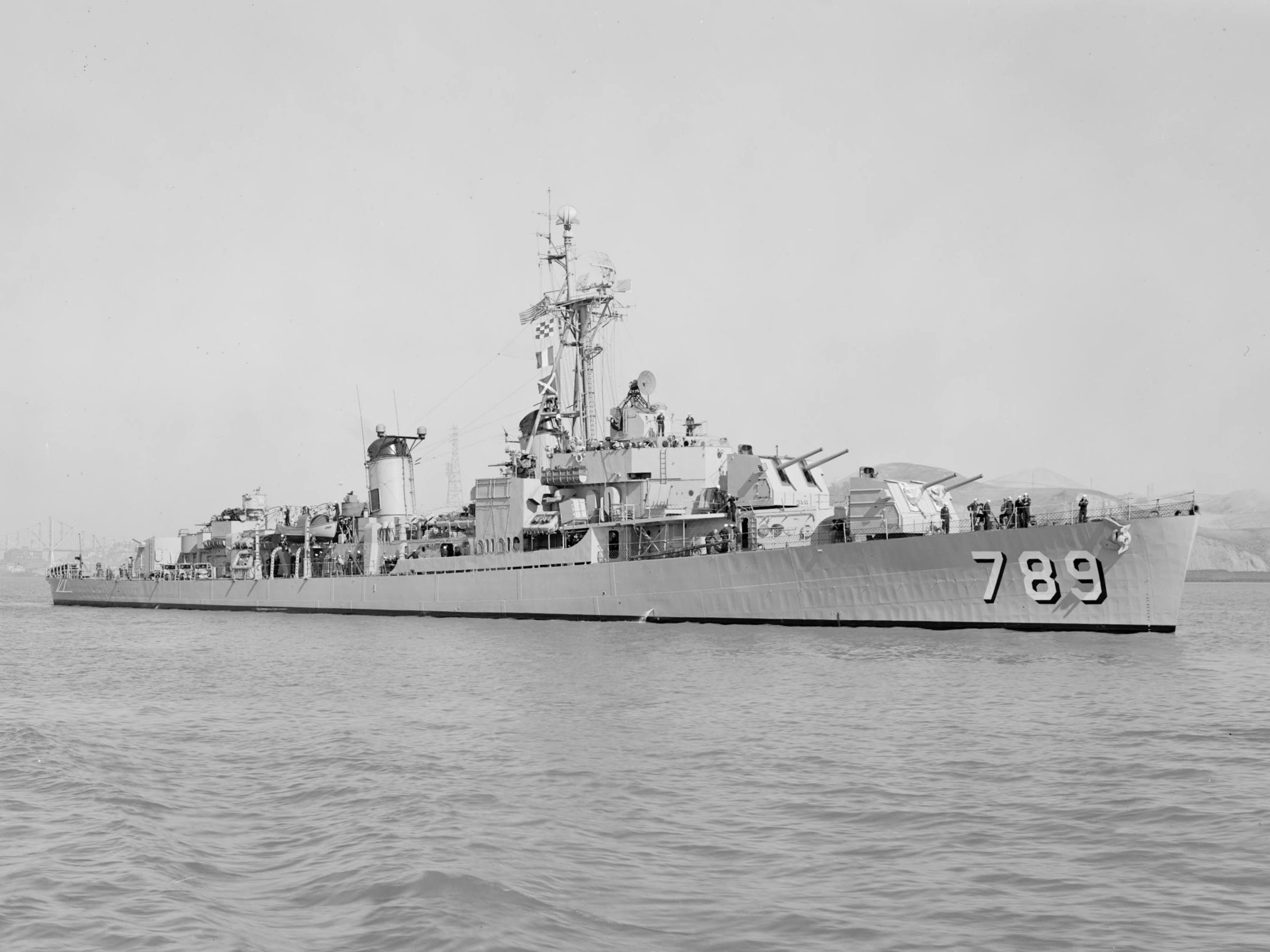
- USS Eversole underway on 6 July 1951

History

United States
- Name: Eversole
- Namesake: John T. Eversole
- Builder: Todd Pacific Shipyards, Seattle, WA
- Laid down: 28 February 1945
- Launched: 8 January 1946
- Sponsored by: Mrs. S. R. Eversole
- Commissioned: 10 May 1946
- Modernized: February 1963 (FRAM IB)
- Decommissioned: 11 July 1973
- Stricken: 21 September 1973
- Identification: Callsign: NTMM; Hull number: DD-789
- Motto: One Step Ahead
- Honors and awards: 7 battle stars (Korea)
- Fate: Transferred to Turkey, 11 July 1973
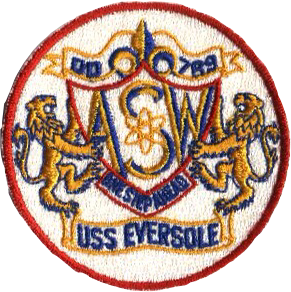
- Badge

Turkey
- Name: Gayret
- Namesake: Gayret
- Acquired: 11 July 1973
- Stricken: 1995
- Identification: Hull number: D-352
- Motto: Bir Adım İleri; (Take a Step Further)
- Status: Museum ship

General characteristics
- Class & type: Gearing-class destroyer
- Displacement: 3,460 long tons (3,516 t) full
- Length: 390 ft 6 in (119.02 m)
- Beam: 40 ft 10 in (12.45 m)
- Draft: 14 ft 4 in (4.37 m)
- Propulsion: Geared turbines, 2 shafts, 60,000 shp (45 MW)
- Speed: 35 knots (65 km/h; 40 mph)
- Range: 4,500 nmi (8,300 km) at 20 kn (37 km/h; 23 mph)
- Complement: 336
- Armament: 6 × 5"/38 caliber guns; 12 × 40 mm AA guns; 11 × 20 mm AA guns; 10 × 21 inch (533 mm) torpedo tubes; 6 × depth charge projectors; 2 × depth charge tracks

USS Eversole (DD-789) was a Gearing-class destroyer of the United States Navy, the second Navy ship named for Lieutenant (junior grade) John T. Eversole (1915–1942), a naval aviator who was killed in the Battle of Midway. She later served in the Turkish Navy from 1973 to 1995 as TCG Gayret (D-352) and is now a ship museum.

Eversole was launched on 8 January 1946 at the Tacoma Washington shipyard of Todd-Pacific Shipyards, Inc., Seattle, Washington; sponsored by Mrs. S. R. Eversole, mother of Lt. (j.g.) Eversole; and commissioned on 10 May 1946. The Eversole was one of the final three ships built in Tacoma by Todd-Pacific before closure of the Tacoma yard.

== Service history ==
Eversole arrived at San Diego, Calif., her home port, on 6 October 1946, and in the years prior to the Korean War, twice sailed to the Far East for duty with the 7th Fleet, patrolling off China and Japan. She sailed from San Diego on 1 May 1950 for another such tour, and thus was in the Orient upon the opening of the war. Until 8 February 1951, when she returned to San Diego, she screened the fast carrier task forces as they launched air strikes against North Korean targets.

During her second tour of duty in the Korean War, from 27 August 1951 to 10 April 1952, Eversole bombarded Hŭngnam, Wonsan, and other points along the east coast of Korea, and served in the Blockading and Escort Force, with ships of the navies of Great Britain, Canada, Netherlands, Australia, New Zealand, and the Republic of Korea. From 17 November 1952 to 29 June 1953, she served a similar tour of duty. Eversole received seven battle stars for her Korean War service.

From 1954 through 1961, Eversole made an annual deployment to the Far East, serving on the Taiwan Patrol, exercising off Japan, Okinawa, and in the Philippines, and visiting a wide variety of western Pacific ports. In both 1957 and 1958, she made her outward bound passage by way of Australia, and in all of these tours, made an important contribution to the power for peace of the 7th Fleet. She then entered the Bremerton Naval Shipyard in Bremerton, Washington to undergo a FRAM I upgrade, a modernization program under which Eversole and forty-three other Gearing-class ships received updated radars, sonars and electronic suites and the ASROC and DASH anti-submarine weapons systems. Eversole emerged from the shipyard in February 1963 to be homeported at the Long Beach Naval Station in Long Beach, California.

During her periods of training and preparation for deployment on the west coast, Eversole often visited ports of the Pacific Northwest, and on occasion voyaged to the Hawaiian Islands.

On 8 October 1969 Eversole deployed from Long Beach Naval Station, California, to the western Pacific stopping in Oahu, Hawaii, and Midway Island in transit to Yokosuka, Japan before frequent deployments to the Tonkin Gulf for plane guard assignments with the carrier forces of the 7th fleet and naval gunfire support duties for ground troops. Between combat deployments Subic Bay Naval Station was used as the overseas homeport. Other R&R and maintenance visits were made to Sasebo, Japan and Hong Kong. Eversole returned to Long Beach Naval Station, California, on 8 April 1970.

== TCG Gayret (D-352) ==
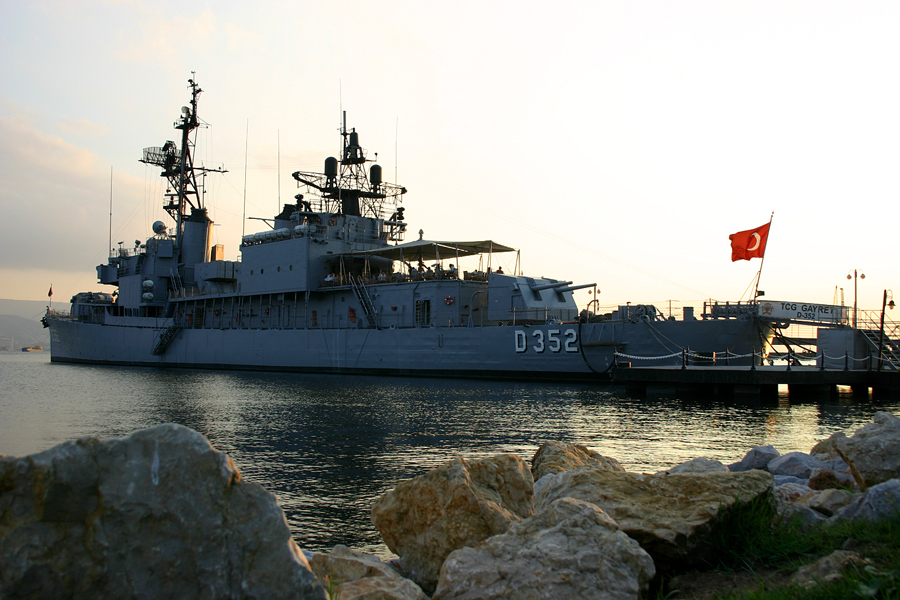
TCG Gayret as a museum ship (TCG Gayret Museum) in Izmit, Turkey.

On 11 July 1973, Eversole was transferred to Turkey. She served in the Turkish Navy as TCG Gayret (D-352). Gayret was stricken in 1995. She is preserved as a museum ship at the Kocaeli Museum Ships Command.
