= USS Eversole (DE-404) =

US Navy WWII destroyer escort

Coordinates: 10°18′N 127°37′E

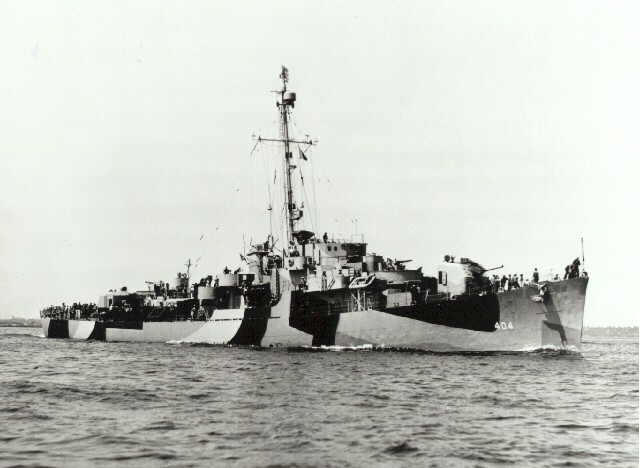
- A wartime picture of USS Eversole (DE-404)

History

United States
- Name: Eversole
- Namesake: John Thomas Eversole
- Builder: Brown Shipbuilding Co., Houston, Texas
- Laid down: 15 September 1943
- Launched: 3 December 1943
- Commissioned: 21 March 1944
- Fate: Sunk by I-45, 28 October 1944

General characteristics
- Class & type: John C. Butler-class destroyer escort
- Displacement: 1,350 long tons (1,372 t)
- Length: 306 ft (93 m)
- Beam: 36 ft 8 in (11.18 m)
- Draft: 9 ft 5 in (2.87 m)
- Propulsion: 2 boilers, 2 geared turbine engines, 12,000 shp (8,900 kW); 2 propellers
- Speed: 24 knots (44 km/h)
- Range: 6,000 nmi (11,000 km; 6,900 mi) at 12 kn (22 km/h)
- Complement: 14 officers, 201 enlisted
- Armament: 2 × single 5 in (127 mm) guns; 2 × twin 40 mm (1.6 in) AA guns; 10 × single 20 mm (0.79 in) AA guns; 1 × triple 21 in (533 mm) torpedo tubes; 8 × depth charge throwers; 1 × Hedgehog ASW mortar; 2 × depth charge racks

USS Eversole (DE-404) was a John C. Butler-class destroyer escort built for the United States Navy during World War II. Named for Lieutenant (junior grade) John Thomas Eversole, (a naval aviator who was killed in the opening phases of the Battle of Midway), she was the first of two U.S. Naval vessels to bear the name. The vessel was torpedoed and sunk on 28 October 1944.

== Construction and commissioning ==
Eversole was laid down on 15 September 1943 by Brown Shipbuilding of Houston, Texas and launched on 3 December, sponsored by Mrs. Sarah R. Eversole, mother of Lieutenant (junior grade) Eversole. The ship was commissioned on 21 March 1944.

== Operational history ==
Eversole sailed from Boston 20 May 1944 for Pearl Harbor, arriving 19 June. After training with submarines in the Hawaiian Islands, she made an escort voyage to Eniwetok, then sailed to Eniwetok and Manus on escort duty. She returned to Eniwetok for antisubmarine patrols until 9 August, when she put to sea screening carriers for the attack on Morotai. She continued this duty, serving with the escort carriers in the initial assaults in Leyte Gulf on 20 October.

After the Battle of Leyte Gulf, Eversole rescued downed pilots, screened two of the damaged escort carriers, and took wounded off one of the carriers. In the early morning of 28 October, Eversole made contact by sonar with a submarine, and half a minute later suffered the first of two torpedo hits. The ship was ordered abandoned. After the men were all in the water, the submarine surfaced and opened fire, then dived once more. Five minutes later there was a tremendous underwater explosion which killed or wounded some of Eversole's crew. Lights from the survivors' flashlights attracted two other escorts, one of which rescued the 139 wounded survivors, as the other began a series of attacks which sank I-45, presumably the Japanese submarine which had torpedoed Eversole.

== Honors ==
Eversole received two battle stars for World War II service. Over 40 of her crew were lost with the ship.

== See also ==
- See List of U.S. Navy ships sunk or damaged in action during World War II for other Navy ships lost in World War II.
