= Tin Can Sailors =

American veterans' association

Tin Can Sailors is the name of The National Association of Destroyer Veterans in the United States. It currently numbers approximately 20,000 members as of the end of 2010.

"Tin can sailor" is a term used to refer to sailors on destroyers. It refers to their lighter construction, with no armor plating, compared to battleships and cruisers.

The Last Stand of the Tin Can Sailors is a book by James D. Hornfischer about the Battle off Samar on October 25, 1944, in which destroyers saw off a much larger force of Japanese ships.

Tales from a Tin Can: The USS Dale from Pearl Harbor to Tokyo Bay is a book by Michael Keith Olson which follows the destroyer USS Dale throughout World War II. The exploits of her sailors are told in their own words.

Tin Can Sailors Will Not Be Forgotten is a 53-minute-long documentary film directed by Greg Berg, which follows the destroyer USS Morris through her 15 battle stars earned in The Pacific War. The sailors themselves tell the story as recollections from a modern-day reunion.
