= USS LST-985 =

1944 LST-542-class tank landing ship

History

United States
- Name: USS LST-985
- Builder: Boston Navy Yard
- Laid down: 3 January 1944
- Launched: 25 February 1944
- Commissioned: 7 April 1944
- Decommissioned: 11 June 1946
- Stricken: 3 July 1946
- Fate: Sold for scrapping, 13 October 1947

General characteristics
- Class & type: LST-542-class tank landing ship
- Displacement: 1,490 long tons (1,514 t) light; 4,080 long tons (4,145 t) full
- Length: 328 ft (100 m)
- Beam: 50 ft (15 m)
- Draft: 8 ft (2.4 m) forward; 14 ft 4 in (4.37 m) aft
- Propulsion: 2 × General Motors 12-567 diesel engines, two shafts
- Speed: 10.8 knots (20.0 km/h; 12.4 mph)
- Complement: 7 officers, 104 enlisted men
- Armament: 6 × 40 mm guns; 6 × 20 mm guns

USS LST-985 was an LST-542-class tank landing ship in the United States Navy. Like many of her class, she was not named and is properly referred to by her hull designation.

LST-985 was laid down on 3 January 1944 at the Boston Navy Yard; launched on 25 February 1944; sponsored by Mrs. Charles E. Schofield; and commissioned on 7 April 1944.

== Service history ==
LST-985 apparently did not see combat service during World War II.

Following World War II, LST-985 performed occupation duty in the Far East and saw service in China until mid-March 1946. She returned to the United States and was decommissioned on 11 June 1946 and struck from the Navy list on 3 July that same year. On 13 October 1947, the ship was sold to William E. Skinner for scrapping.
