= USS Hudson (DD-475) =

Fletcher-class destroyer

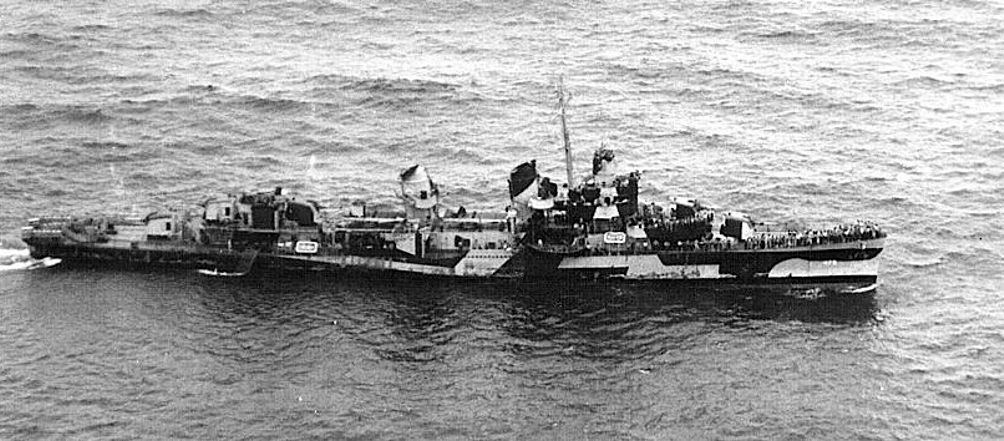
- USS Hudson (DD-475)

History

United States
- Namesake: William L. Hudson
- Builder: Boston Navy Yard
- Laid down: 20 February 1942
- Launched: 3 June 1942
- Commissioned: 13 April 1943
- Decommissioned: 31 May 1946
- Stricken: 1 December 1972
- Fate: Sold for scrap, 27 November 1973

General characteristics
- Class & type: Fletcher-class destroyer
- Displacement: 2,050 tons
- Length: 376 ft 6 in (114.7 m)
- Beam: 39 ft 8 in (12.1 m)
- Draft: 17 ft 9 in (5.4 m)
- Propulsion: 60,000 shp (45 MW); 2 propellers
- Speed: 35 knots (65 km/h; 40 mph)
- Range: 6500 nmi. (12,000 km) at 15 kt
- Complement: 336
- Armament: 5 × single Mk 12 5 in (127 mm)/38 guns; 5 × twin 40 mm (1.6 in) Bofors AA guns; 7 × single 20 mm (0.8 in) Oerlikon AA guns; 2 × quintuple 21 in (533 mm) torpedo tubes; 6 × single depth charge throwers; 2 × depth charge racks

USS Hudson (DD-475), a Fletcher-class destroyer, was the second ship of the United States Navy to be named for Captain William L. Hudson (1794–1862).

Hudson (DD-475) was launched 3 June 1942 by the Boston Navy Yard; sponsored by Mrs. Henry H. Hough, wife of Admiral Henry H. Hough (Ret.); and commissioned 13 April 1943.

== History ==
After shakedown and escort duty along the Atlantic coast, Hudson sailed for Efate, New Hebrides, where she was just in time to provide fire support for the initial landings on Bougainville 1 November. As the Japanese staged a heavy air attack 8 November, Hudson helped repel them by splashing two "bogies" and assisting on a third. She then made antishipping sweeps in the Truk area and participated in operations against the Green Islands 1 February 1944. En route to the invasion, Hudson attacked and sank a Japanese submarine on 31 January.

Following a brief respite in Australia, Hudson steamed to Kwajalein to join the armada readying for the invasion of the Marianas. After delivering shore bombardment to clear the way for landings on Saipan, Guam, and Tinian, the destroyer took part in the Battle of the Philippine Sea on 19 June. She contributed two kills to the massive destruction of Japanese planes later known as "The Marianas Turkey Shoot". In mid-July, as the invasion of Guam was launched, Hudson steamed off the island to screen transports and shot down another enemy aircraft, as well as rescuing three downed Navy pilots and a Japanese flier. From the Marianas, Hudson steamed to Palau to support landings on Peleliu and Angaur from 12–25 September. Departing Manus in the Admiralty Islands on 4 October, she reached San Francisco 2 weeks later for overhaul.

After refresher training at Pearl Harbor, Hudson returned to action, arriving off Iwo Jima on 19 February 1945. she provided vital radar picket protection during the initial invasion of the enemy stronghold. While returning from Iwo Jima after the island was secured, Hudson rescued eight survivors of a B-29 Superfortress which had crashed at sea on 8 March. Her next action came as a radar picket ship off Okinawa on 1 April, when American troops stormed the last Japanese stronghold before the home islands. On 5 April the Hudson gained credit for her second Japanese submarine, when a 6-hour attack with six barrages of depth charges resulted in the sinking of the Ro-49 off Okinawa. Although under almost constant attack by kamikaze aircraft, Hudson suffered only one injury to a crewman, inflicted when a kamikaze crashed nearby on 22 April 1945, a wingtip clipping a chief on the head.

Also off Okinawa, Hudson became known as the "destroyer that saved a carrier". On 4 May a kamikaze pilot crashed into the escort carrier Sangamon (CVE-26). Hudson steered for the fiercely blazing carrier. Despite the exploding ammunition on the drifting carrier, the destroyer was able to go alongside three times, getting a total of 16 hoses over the side. The overhanging flight deck of the carrier caused extensive damage to Hudson's superstructure as burning debris and a flaming plane jettisoned by Sangamons crew crashed into Hudsons depth charges on the fantail, causing some damage. When the fires were finally under control, Hudson had suffered damage equal to that of the kamikaze plane's victim, though the carrier had been saved with only a small loss of life and was ordered to Guam for repairs on 10 May.

== Fate ==
Promptly repaired, Hudson joined the 3rd Fleet off Okinawa 22 June and then proceeded to Eniwetok for convoy duty in the Marshalls. After escorting a convoy to the Aleutians, she returned to Northern Japan to take part in the occupation and control of the enemy home islands 8 September, 6 days after the signing of unconditional surrender in Tokyo Bay. From Japan, Hudson sailed to Alaska where she began carrying veterans back to the States in Operation Magic Carpet. She then put in at the Puget Sound Navy Yard, Bremerton, Wash., to prepare to decommission.

Sailing to San Diego 15 March 1946, Hudson decommissioned and went into reserve there 31 May. In January 1947 Hudson was moved to Mare Island Naval Shipyard, Calif, where she was put into mothballs. Hudson was stricken 1 December 1972, sold 27 November 1973 and broken up for scrap.

== Honors ==
Hudson received nine battle stars for World War II service.
