= USS Thomas F. Nickel =

Rudderow-class destroyer escort

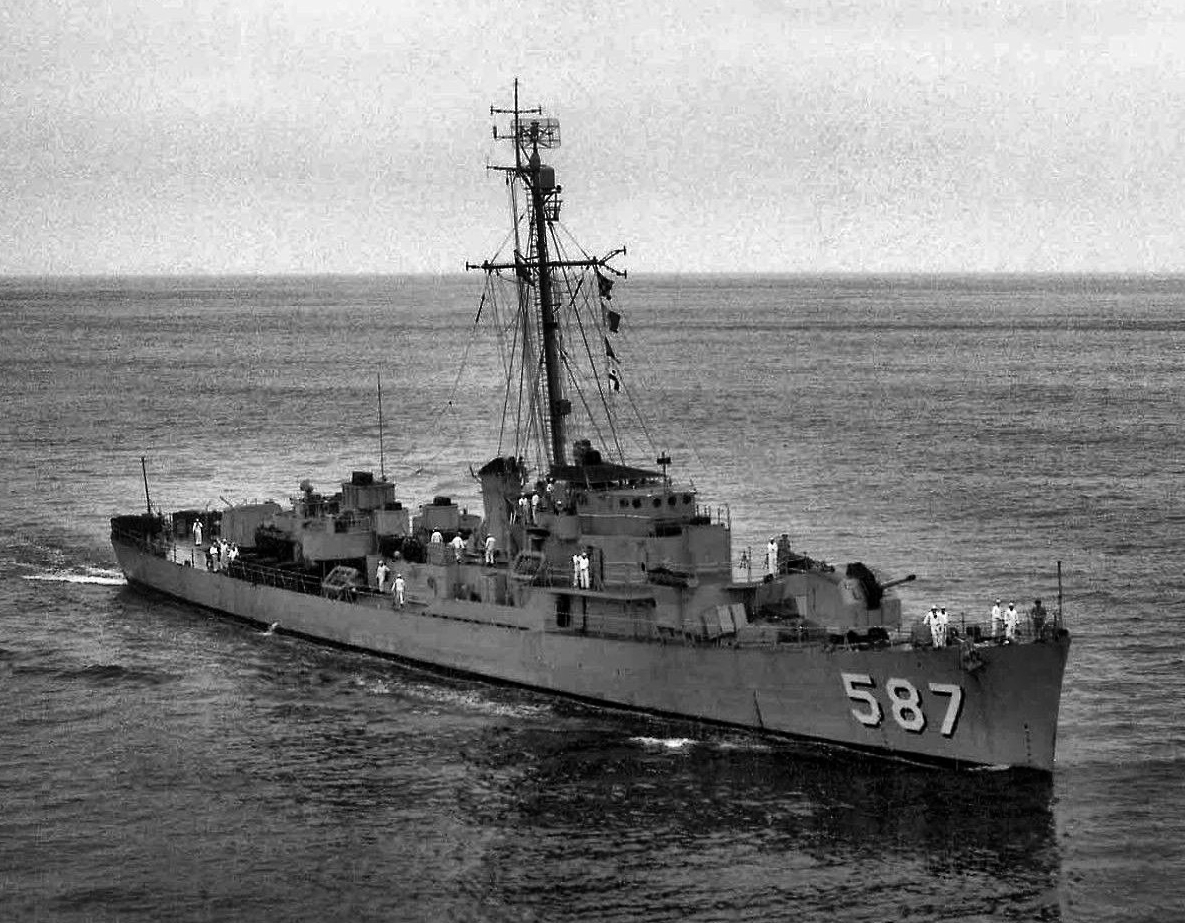

History

United States
- Name: USS Thomas F. Nickel
- Namesake: Thomas F. Nickel
- Builder: Bethlehem Hingham Shipyard
- Laid down: 15 December 1943
- Launched: 22 January 1944
- Commissioned: 9 June 1944
- Decommissioned: 31 May 1946
- In service: 8 July 1948
- Out of service: 22 September 1950
- Recommissioned: 22 September 1950
- Decommissioned: 26 February 1958
- Stricken: 1 December 1972
- Honors and awards: 1 battle star (World War II)
- Fate: Sold for scrap, 9 June 1973

General characteristics
- Class & type: Rudderow-class destroyer escort
- Displacement: 1,450 long tons (1,473 t) light; 1,673 long tons (1,700 t) standard; 1,780 long tons (1,809 t) full load
- Length: 306 ft (93 m) o/a; 300 ft (91 m) w/l
- Beam: 37 ft (11 m)
- Draft: 9 ft 9 in (2.97 m); 13 ft 9 in (4.19 m) full load
- Propulsion: 2 Foster Wheeler boilers, 12,000 hp (8.9 MW); General Electric turbines and electric motors (turboelectric drive), 2 shafts; 378 tons oil fuel
- Speed: 23.5 knots (43.5 km/h; 27.0 mph)
- Range: 5,500 nmi (10,200 km) at 15 kn (28 km/h; 17 mph)
- Complement: 221
- Armament: 2 × single 5-inch/38-caliber guns; 2 × twin 40 mm guns; 10 × single 20 mm guns; 1 × triple 21-inch (533 mm) torpedo tubes; 1 × Hedgehog anti-submarine mortar; 8 × K-gun depth charge projectors; 2 × depth charge tracks

USS Thomas F. Nickel (DE-587) was a Rudderow-class destroyer escort in service with the United States Navy from 1944 to 1946 and from 1948 to 1958. She was sold for scrapping in 1973.

== Namesake ==
Thomas Frederick Nickel was born on 18 July 1921 in Lansing, Michigan. He enlisted in the United States Marine Corps Reserve on 3 February 1942 and reported to Marine Corps Recruit Depot Parris Island on 5 February 1942 for boot camp training. Transferred to Marine Corps Base Quantico, on 23 March 1942, he was ordered overseas on 28 April 1942. Private Nickel was serving with the 1st Marine Raider Battalion when it landed at Tulagi, Solomon Islands, on 7 August 1942. That day, he worked his way forward under heavy machine gun fire and knocked out a Japanese position with hand grenades, enabling his squad to advance without further casualties. Mortally wounded in the attack, he was posthumously awarded the Silver Star.

== History ==
Thomas F. Nickel was laid down on 15 December 1943 at Hingham, Massachusetts, by the Bethlehem-Hingham Shipyards; launched on 22 January 1944; sponsored by Mrs. Fred W. Nickel; and commissioned on 9 June 1944.

=== World War II, 1944–1945 ===
After shakedown training in the Caribbean from 29 June to 26 July, the destroyer escort made one round-trip voyage across the Atlantic escorting Convoy UGS-50 to Bizerte, Tunisia, and back before departing Boston with Escort Division 71 on the last day of September, bound for the South Pacific.

She transited the Panama Canal on 15 October and, after calls at the Galápagos and Society Islands, arrived at Espiritu Santo on 1 November. There, after the destroyer escort had taken on 15 aerial torpedoes as deck cargo, she headed for Manus. She delivered her dangerous cargo at Seeadler Harbor on 7 November. Three days later, the ship was anchored there slightly more than a mile from ammunition ship Mount Hood (AE-11) when she exploded, but was not damaged.

Thomas F. Nickel next proceeded to New Guinea and arrived at Humboldt Bay on 21 November. The following week she again put to sea in the screen of a Philippine-bound convoy. She arrived at San Pedro Bay, Leyte, on 15 December and, two days later, began the return voyage to Hollandia with another convoy.

On 28 December, the destroyer escort departed Aitape with Task Group 78.1, the San Fabian Attack Force, which was transporting the 43rd Infantry Division to make the initial assault against Luzon. The American ships entered Lingayen Gulf on 9 January 1945, and the DE protected the landings. She was then assigned to the anti-submarine and anti-aircraft screen until 18 January. On 10 January, DuPage (APA-41) was hit and badly damaged by a suicide plane; a boat from Nickel rescued five of that attack transport's crewmen who had been blown overboard and gave them medical attention.

On 18 January orders sent DE-587 to New Guinea waters to conduct anti-submarine patrols between the islands of Biak and Owi; but, early in February, she found herself heading back to the Philippines in the screen of Task Group 78.6, the third Lingayen reinforcement group. She remained in the Lingayen area of Luzon from 6 February until 7 March. In the following months, the escort performed anti-submarine patrol and escort duty between San Pedro, Subic Bay, and ports in New Guinea and the Carolines. On 6 August, she departed Subic Bay with a convoy to refuel at Buckner Bay and returned to the Philippines escorting Oak Hill (LSD-7). In the evening of 12 August Oak Hill reported a periscope on her port quarter and, eight minutes later, a torpedo wake 2,000 yards astern of her. Thomas F. Nickel made several depth charge attacks and then lost contact. Both ships arrived safely at Leyte on the 15th, the day hostilities ended.

=== Post-war activities, 1945–1946 ===
The destroyer escort made one more round-trip voyage to Buckner Bay in late August, escorting Cabildo (LSD-16) there and returning with Hocking (APA-121). She operated in the Philippines until 29 November when she got underway for the United States. Thomas F. Nickel arrived at San Diego on 18 December 1945, and was decommissioned on 31 May 1946.

=== Naval reserve training ship, 1948–1957 ===
In June she was assigned to the 12th Naval District as a training ship. On 31 October, she arrived under tow at San Francisco and was subsequently moved to Sacramento for use as a naval reserve armory.

The destroyer escort was reactivated on 8 July 1948 and placed in service as a naval reserve training ship. She made weekend and two-week cruises to Mexico, Canada, Alaska, Pearl Harbor, and Pacific coast ports. After the ship was recommissioned on 22 September 1950 she continued the same duty. She operated out of San Francisco until December 1951, when she moved to San Diego.

Nickel made a goodwill visit to Humboldt Bay, California for Armed Forces Day in May 1954 and also a two-week Pacific cruise in February 1955 arriving in Honolulu on 17 February, and returning to Treasure Island, San Francisco on 26 February.

=== Decommissioning and sale ===
On 25 November 1957 Thomas F. Nickel was assigned to the Pacific Reserve Fleet. She was decommissioned on 26 February 1958 and berthed at San Diego until she was struck from the Navy List on 1 December 1972. Her hulk was sold for scrap at San Jose, California, to the Levin Metals Co. on 9 June 1973.

== Military honors and awards ==
American Campaign Medal
Asiatic–Pacific Campaign Medal (with one bronze service star)
World War II Victory Medal
National Defense Service Medal
Philippine Liberation Medal
