= USS Mertz =

Fletcher-class destroyer

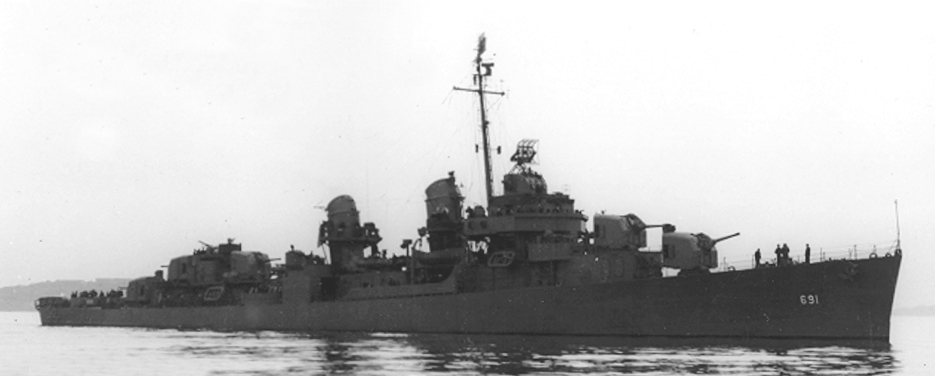
- USS Mertz

History

United States
- Name: Mertz
- Laid down: 10 May 1943
- Launched: 11 September 1943
- Commissioned: 19 November 1943
- Decommissioned: 23 April 1946
- Stricken: 1 October 1970
- Honours and awards: 10 Battle Stars
- Fate: Sold 16 December 1971, scrapped

General characteristics
- Class & type: Fletcher-class destroyer
- Displacement: 2,050 tons
- Length: 376 ft 6 in (114.76 m)
- Beam: 39 ft 8 in (12.09 m)
- Draft: 17 ft 9 in (5.41 m)
- Propulsion: 60,000 shp (45,000 kW); 2 propellers
- Speed: 35 knots (65 km/h; 40 mph)
- Range: 6,500 nmi (12,000 km) at 15 kn (28 km/h)
- Complement: 336
- Armament: 5 × single Mk 12 5 in (127 mm)/38 guns; 5 × twin 40 mm (1.6 in) Bofors AA guns; 7 × single 20 mm (0.8 in) Oerlikon AA guns; 2 × quintuple 21 in (533 mm) torpedo tubes; 6 × single depth charge throwers; 2 × depth charge racks

USS Mertz (DD-691) was a Fletcher-class destroyer in the service of the United States Navy from 1943 to 1946. She was scrapped in 1972.

== Namesake ==
Albert Mertz was born on 26 March 1851 in Richmond, Wisconsin. He graduated from the United States Naval Academy in June 1872. Commissioned Ensign on 15 July 1873, he was assigned to the Coast Survey on 26 November 1877 until he returned to regular duty in the Navy on 6 July 1878, serving on the USS Wyoming and USS Alliance, among other ships. Following promotion to Commander on 11 April 1902, he took command of his first ship, USS Newport on 20 July 1903. On 20 December 1909 he reported for duty as commandant, Naval Station Cavite and Olongapo, Philippines. Appointed Rear Admiral 20 October 1910, he departed the Philippines on 3 February 1912 to become Governor of the Naval Home, Philadelphia, Pennsylvania on 25 March. He retired on 26 March 1913 and died at San Diego, California on 21 July 1936.

== Construction and commissioning ==
Mertz was laid down by Bath Iron Works Corp., Bath, Maine on 10 May 1943 and launched on 11 September 1943; sponsored by Mrs. Selma M. Allen, daughter of Rear Admiral Mertz The ship was commissioned at Charlestown, Massachusetts on 19 November 1943.

== Service history ==
=== Arrival in the Pacific ===
After shakedown off Bermuda, Mertz departed Norfolk, Virginia, 26 January 1944 for the central Pacific, via the Panama Canal and San Diego, California, arriving at Pearl Harbor 5 March. On 9 March, the destroyer got underway for the Marshall Islands as convoy escort, arriving Majuro Atoll 6 days later. Mertz sailed on 22 March to join TG 58.2 and on 26 March and act as escort back to Majuro. En route on 31 March, she caught a Japanese maru at 0600 in the glare of her searchlights. The enemy merchant ship maneuvered to get away, only to go down under the hail of 5-inch (127 mm) projectiles from Mertz. The task group reached Majuro 6 April. Five days later Mertz steamed for the New Hebrides as a screen for the escort carrier Barnes, arriving at Espiritu Santo on 15 April.

In mid-May, the destroyer returned to Pearl Harbor to prepare for the Marianas campaign. She took fire support and patrol station close ashore to Saipan on 14 June, pounding gun emplacements in the daytime and at night maintaining illumination over the enemy lines until 22 June, when she began screening convoys.

=== Peleliu and Angaur ===
Mertz participated in the occupations of Peleliu and of Angaur in the Palau Islands, arriving 10 September. She retired to Manus, Admiralty Islands, on 23 September to prepare for the invasion of Leyte, Philippines.

=== Philippines campaign ===
On 20 October, D-Day for the Leyte landing forces, Mertz escorted landing craft through air attacks to the beach and later in the day patrolled off Dinagat Island at the entrance to Leyte Gulf. Early in the morning of 25 October as the Japanese Southern Force approached Leyte Gulf through the Mindanao Sea, Mertz and McNair patrolled between Desolation Point and Homonhon Island, lest the enemy fleet choose to steam north along the east coast of Dinagat Island to attack the Allied beachhead. When the Japanese entered Surigao Strait, Rear Admiral Jesse B. Oldendorf’s force met and destroyed the enemy armada in the classic "crossing-of-the-T" maneuver known as the Battle of Surigao Strait, part of the overall Battle of Leyte Gulf. Later that same day Mertz splashed a Zero at several hundred yards with heavy machinegun fire.

With the Leyte beachhead established, the destroyer got underway 26 October for Hollandia, New Guinea, anchoring in Humboldt Bay on the 30th to replenish. She got underway for Leyte again 9 November escorting a reinforcement convoy arriving 5 days later. Mertz then continued on to Seeadler Harbor, Manus, to join a task unit staging for the daring expedition through the Sulu Sea, controlled by the enemy since early 1942, to capture Mindoro. The American ships had to contend with both a typhoon and heavy air attacks. Mertz splashed a Ki-43 ("Oscar") 15 December and assisted in the destruction of several others. Departing San Pedro Bay 4 January 1945, she made another voyage through the Sulu Sea, to support the invasion of Luzon at Lingayen Gulf on 9 January before returning to San Pedro Bay on 16 January.

=== Attacks on Japan ===
On 10 February, Mertz steamed from Ulithi for three months at sea with the Fast Carrier Task Force. During this time, she played a role in the airstrikes on the Tokyo area 16 February, the landings on Iwo Jima 19 February, and the raids on Okinawa 1 March. While screening the flattops off Kyūshū, Japan, in March, she downed two more enemy planes. While operating off Okinawa Mertz helped sink the I-56 on 18 April. The destroyer retired to Ulithi 14 May, before returning to Okinawa on 24 May. She next steamed to Okino Daito Jima which she bombarded on 9 June. The next day, she got underway for Leyte Gulf, anchoring at San Pedro Bay 13 June.

As part of Adm. Willam F. Halsey’s 3rd Fleet she cleared San Pedro on 1 July, and nine days later arrived at the launching area off the southeast coast of Tokyo for strike on the Japanese home islands. Beginning with the attacks on Tokyo 10 July, Mertz ranged up and down the coasts of Japan until she joined an antishipping sweep in the Kuriles while en route to the Aleutians. The destroyer arrived at Adak 14 August, the day of Japan's capitulation.

=== End of World War II and fate ===
Mertz's first and only peacetime duty came 31 August, when she departed Adak for Japan, arriving Ominato, northern Honshū, on 8 September, to operate with the 3rd Fleet during the occupation of the northern Honshū-Hokkaidō area. On 15 September the destroyer departed Ominato Harbor for the west coast, arriving San Francisco on 30 September.

On 1 December, Mertz steamed to San Diego, where she decommissioned 23 April 1946 and entered the Pacific Reserve Fleet. She was reassigned to the Long Beach, California, group 1 July 1951 and the Stockton, California, group 1 January 1959. Mertz was finally sold for scrap on 16 December 1971.

== Awards ==
Mertz received 10 battle stars for World War II service.
