= USS Underhill =

Buckley-class destroyer escort

Coordinates: 19°20′0″N 126°42′0″E

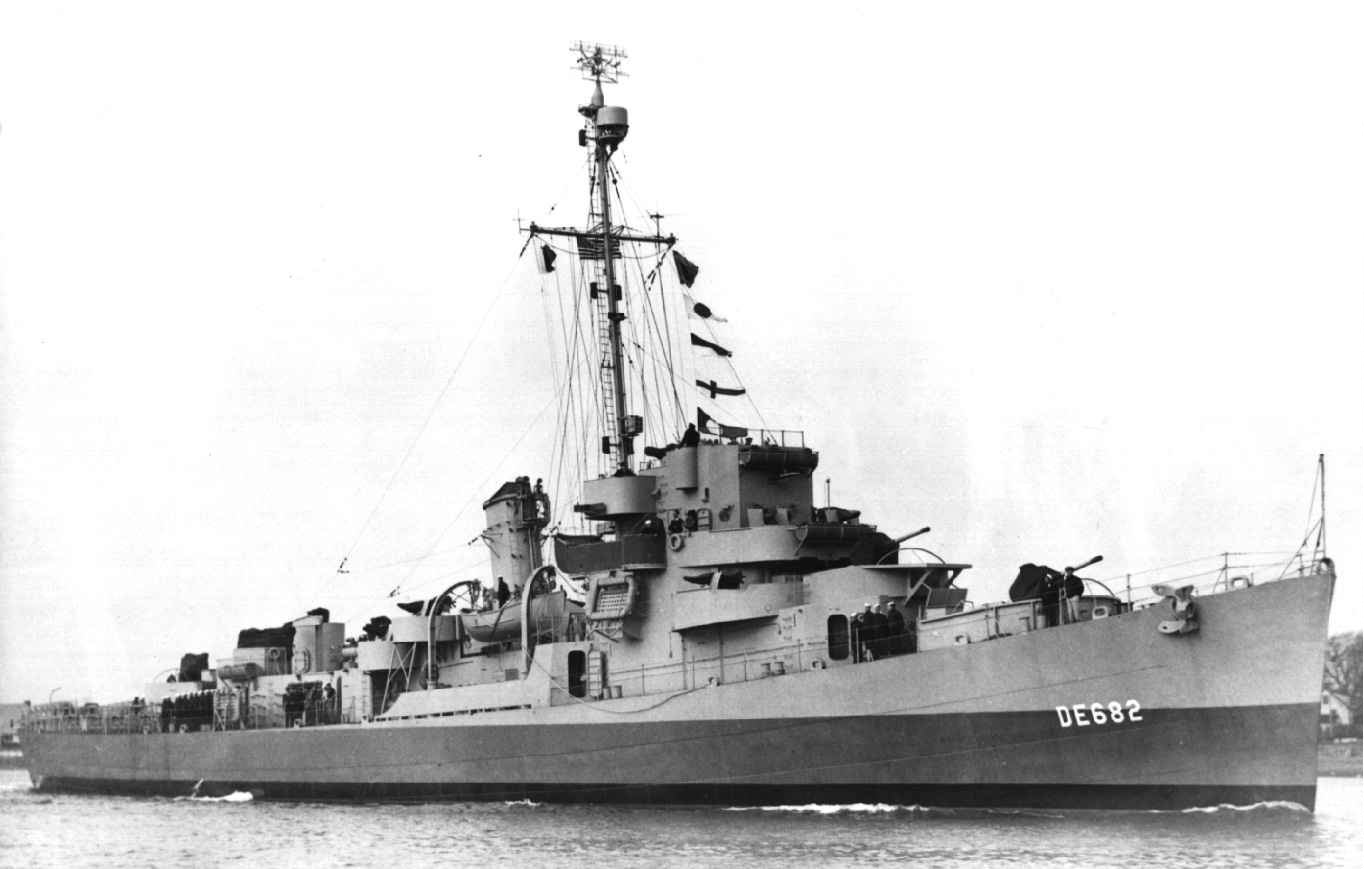
- USS Underhill (DE-682)

History

United States
- Builder: Bethlehem Steel Company
- Laid down: 16 September 1943
- Launched: 15 October 1943
- Commissioned: 15 November 1943
- Stricken: 1 September 1945
- Fate: Sunk by Japanese Kaiten manned torpedo; 24 July 1945

General characteristics
- Class & type: Buckley-class destroyer escort
- Displacement: 1,400 tons light, 1,673 tons standard
- Length: 306 ft (93 m)
- Beam: 37 ft (11 m)
- Draft: 13 ft 6 in (4.11 m)
- Propulsion: Turbo-electric drive, 12,000 hp (8.9 MW)
- Speed: 23 knots (43 km/h)
- Complement: 15 officers, 198 sailors
- Armament: 3 × 3 in (76 mm) (76.2 mm) (3x1); 4 × 1.1"/75 caliber gun (1x4); 8 × 20 mm cannon (8x1); 3 × 21-inch (533 mm) torpedo tubes (later removed); 1 × hedgehog, 2 × depth charge tracks; 8 × K-gun depth charge projectors

USS Underhill (DE-682) was a Buckley-class destroyer escort of the United States Navy during World War II. Built in 1943, she served in the Atlantic, the Mediterranean, and the Pacific until her sinking in a suicide attack by a Japanese Kaiten manned torpedo on 24 July 1945.

Samuel Jackson Underhill, the ship's namesake, was a naval aviator killed during the Battle of the Coral Sea in May 1942.

== Construction and Commissioning ==
Underhills keel was laid down on 16 September 1943 by the Bethlehem Steel Company's Fore River Shipyard at Quincy, Massachusetts. She was launched on 15 October 1943 sponsored by Mrs. David (Bertha) Underhill, aunt and guardian of Ensign Underhill. Underhill was commissioned exactly one month later.

== Atlantic/Mediterranean service ==
After trial runs and crew training, Underhill moved to the Boston Navy Yard for provisioning and loading of ammunition. On 2 December 1943, she was underway to Bermuda for further training and shakedown, returning to Boston Navy Yard on 10 January 1944 for minor repairs. She got underway from Boston on 17 January 1944 and arrived at Guantanamo Bay on 22 January, reporting to Commander, Caribbean Sea Frontier, for duty. She operated out of Trinidad and Guantanamo escorting convoys until late in May when she escorted SS George Washington from Kingston, Jamaica, to Miami, Florida.

Underhill returned on 30 May 1944 to Boston Navy Yard, where her torpedo tubes were removed and replaced with Bofors 40 mm antiaircraft guns. Additionally two 20 mm anti-aircraft guns were added on the fantail. Her new area of operations was the Mediterranean Sea, where the Junkers Ju 88 dive bombers flying out of Southern France had been converted to torpedo planes and were taking a toll on British and French convoys.

Following training exercises in Casco Bay, Maine, Underhill got underway before dawn on Independence Day and steamed from Hampton Roads to screen UGS 47, a large, slow convoy bound for Mediterranean ports. Underhill conducted battle drills and investigated sonar contacts during the long, uneventful Atlantic voyage. In the Mediterranean Sea on 21 and 22 July, she responded to several air raid warnings, but no enemy action materialized, although the last three convoys to pass along this route had been attacked by German planes.

She escorted convoys between Bizerte, Tunisia and Oran, Algeria. After her first convoy in Bizerte, Underhill was ordered out into the Mediterranean Sea where she steamed all night at flank speed, fully illuminated in waters known to be populated with U-boats and overflown by German aircraft. The invasion of southern France was launched a few days later; it is likely Underhill's cruise was a diversion or a probe. When returning to Bizerte, she struck a ship sunken in the channel and badly damaged her port propeller and shaft, which was repaired in Oran. After arriving at that port on 27 July, she underwent temporary repairs; then, on 5 August, she departed North Africa. Early on 6 August, she joined the escort of Convoy GUS 47, with which she arrived safely at New York City on 18 August. Six days later, Commander Newcomb relieved Jackson as commanding officer; he would hold the post for the rest of his life.

The next convoy, UGS 54 to Plymouth, England, in September, was uneventful until Underhill left Plymouth in October. Upon leaving the harbor, a submarine sonar contact was made in the English Channel. Several hours of depth charging accomplished nothing, but while running the patterns, the ship struck an underwater object (possibly a U-boat) destroying the ship's sonar soundhead. Underhill drydocked at Plymouth, but the British were unable to make needed repairs, so Underhill returned to Boston with a group of tank landing ships (LSTs) for a new sound head.

She escorted Convoy UGS 60 from Boston to Mers el Kebir in November; then engaged in anti-submarine warfare exercises out of Oran with the French submarine Doris. She departed that Algerian port on 3 December escorting GUS 60 and reached New York on 21 December. She entered the Brooklyn Navy Yard on 21 December, departing for New London, Connecticut, on 8 January 1945 for a temporary assignment with Submarine Forces, Atlantic. Operating out of New London, she served as a training and escort ship for submarines, took part in exercises in Block Island Sound and Long Island Sound; and trained intensively in anti-submarine warfare.

== Pacific service ==
In late January 1945, Underhill was assigned to the Seventh Fleet in the Philippine Islands, departing New London on 8 February 1945, rendezvousing with HMS Patroller to escort the British escort carrier to the Panama Canal Zone. Underhill then steamed via the Panama Canal, the Galapagos Islands, and Bora Bora to the Admiralty Islands and arrived at Seeadler Harbor on 15 March 1945.

Her first convoy took her to Lingayen Gulf where she remained for four days of radar picket duty. From there she went on to Hollandia (currently known as Jayapura) and Biak. On 5 June 1945, Underhill left Hollandia escorting the troopship USS General M.B. Stewart (AP-140) to Leyte Gulf.

On 10 June 1945, Underhill left Leyte for Hollandia, but en route received a distress call from OA-10 #23, a Consolidated PBY Catalina flying boat. Underhill and Thadeus Parker were diverted to the crash site by orders of the Commander, Philippine Sea Frontier. The destroyers and various aircraft patrolled the area until 12 June when the search was abandoned. After Parker and the aircraft had left the area, Underhill's lookouts spotted green dye marker and a ration can floating in the water. Investigating further, into a rain squall, the lookouts found three survivors, who had been in the water about 60 hours with life jackets but no life raft. Underhill took them aboard at 07:59 and transported them to Hollandia.

Underhill escorted shipping between Manus, Bora Bora, and Palau, until she joined a large convoy of supply and troopships. She departed Leyte Gulf on 9 July and arrived at Okinawa on 14 July 1945. There, she was assigned to radar picket duty until relieved to serve as escort commander of Task Unit 99-1-18, a convoy from Buckner Bay, Okinawa back to Leyte Gulf on 21 July 1945. The convoy included one troop ship and six LSTs carrying troops of the 96th Division back to the Philippines for rest and reinforcements. The convoy escorts were patrol craft PC-1251, PC-803, PC-804, and PC-807, sub chasers SC-1306 and SC-1309, and patrol craft escort PCE-872.

== Underhill sinking ==
On the morning of the third day out, 24 July 1945, about 200 to 300 miles northeast of Cape Engaño, Underhill's radar detected a Japanese "Dinah" reconnaissance plane circling the convoy about ten miles out. Her crew immediately manned their battle stations and ordered other escorts to air defense stations. The Japanese pilot remained out of gun range, determining the convoy's base course and relaying it to Japanese submarines in the area. After some 45 minutes, Underhill crew secured from battle stations and ordered the other escorts to resume assigned patrol stations. During this time, an SC had developed mechanical problems and had to be taken in tow by PCE-872.

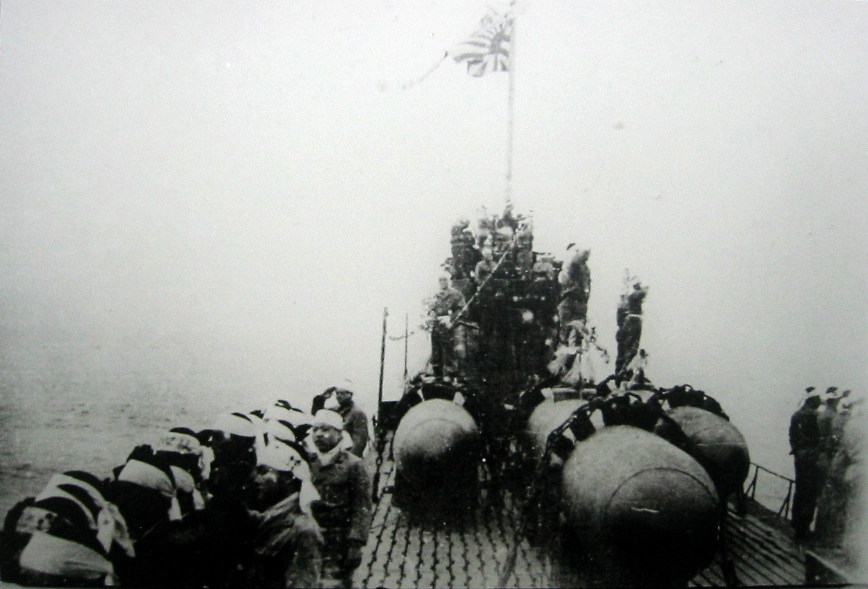
Three Kaiten torpedoes on the deck of an Imperial Japanese Navy submarine

Two or three Japanese submarines were in the area. After establishing the convoy's base course, one released a dummy naval mine in the path of the convoy. When it was sighted by Underhill lookouts, the ship's commander ordered a general course change to port. When the last ship had cleared, Underhill stood in to sink the mine. After repeated direct hits by the 20-millimeter guns and 30-calibre rifle fire, the convoy realized the mine was a diversionary tactic by the Japanese submarines.

A sonar contact made earlier had been lost during the course changes required by the mine threat, but Underhill regained contact and guided PC-804 into a depth charge attack with no immediate results. A few minutes later, however, a sub was sighted on the surface in the area where PC-804 had attacked. Underhill set course to ram, but the sub dived and the command was changed to drop depth charges. A 13-charge pattern was laid, explosions brought up oil and debris, and PC-804 reported a kill.

Underhill reversed course and passed back through the debris. Sonar picked up another contact. The depth charges had brought to the surface two Kaiten, Japanese suicide manned torpedoes, each with a warhead equivalent to about two standard torpedoes. One was on either side of Underhill; the one to starboard was too close for any of Underhill's guns to bear.

At 15:15, the captain ordered flank speed, a turn onto collision course, and all hands to stand by to ram. Underhill struck the Kaiten to port, and two explosions resulted, the first directly under the bridge and magazine area, the second, a few seconds later, forward of the bridge area and more to starboard. Underhill broke in half at the forward fire room. The stern section remained upright and afloat; The bow, sticking straight up, began drifting away to starboard. The explosions flung a tremendous quantity of oily water over the aft section, knocking down sailors and washing some overboard, but also dousing possible fires in that portion of the ship.

Although hampered in their rescue efforts by the necessity to pursue sound contacts and by alarms over real and imagined periscope sightings, PC-803 and PC-804 quickly came to the aid of survivors in the water and on the slowly sinking aft section. On board Underhill, the wounded were brought to the boat and main decks, while unhurt survivors aided the injured and attempted to control the damage.

About an hour later PC-803 and PC-804 had returned to rescue survivors. Hampered because of still being under attack by the midget subs, the transfer of many seriously wounded sailors to the patrol craft was difficult. PC-804 was the first to reach the combat site to assist with rescue operations and hove-to off the starboard quarter of Underhill. The patrol boats and sub chasers alternated between assisting survivors and attacking submarine contacts.

After the last known survivors were rescued, a firing line was formed by PC-803, PC-804, and PCE-872. The fragments of Underhill were sunk by three-inch (76.2 mm) and 40 mm gunfire at 19:17. Loss Location reported at 19°20'N, 126°42'E.

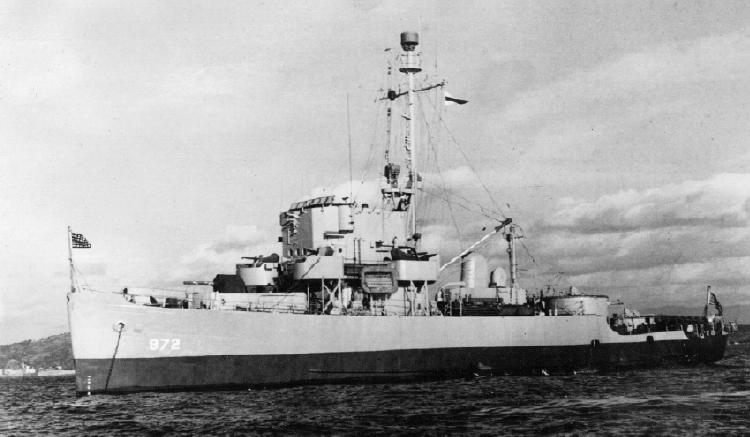
PCE-872 assisted in the final sinking of the USS Underhill.

The remainder of 24 July was spent rejoining the convoy. Some survivors were transferred to LST 768 and the balance to LST 739 which had on board Commander LST Group 46 who among the command was the only Medical Doctor in the convoy at about 03:00 on 25 July. Task Unit 99-1-18 proceeded to its destination of Leyte Gulf.

=== Aftermath ===
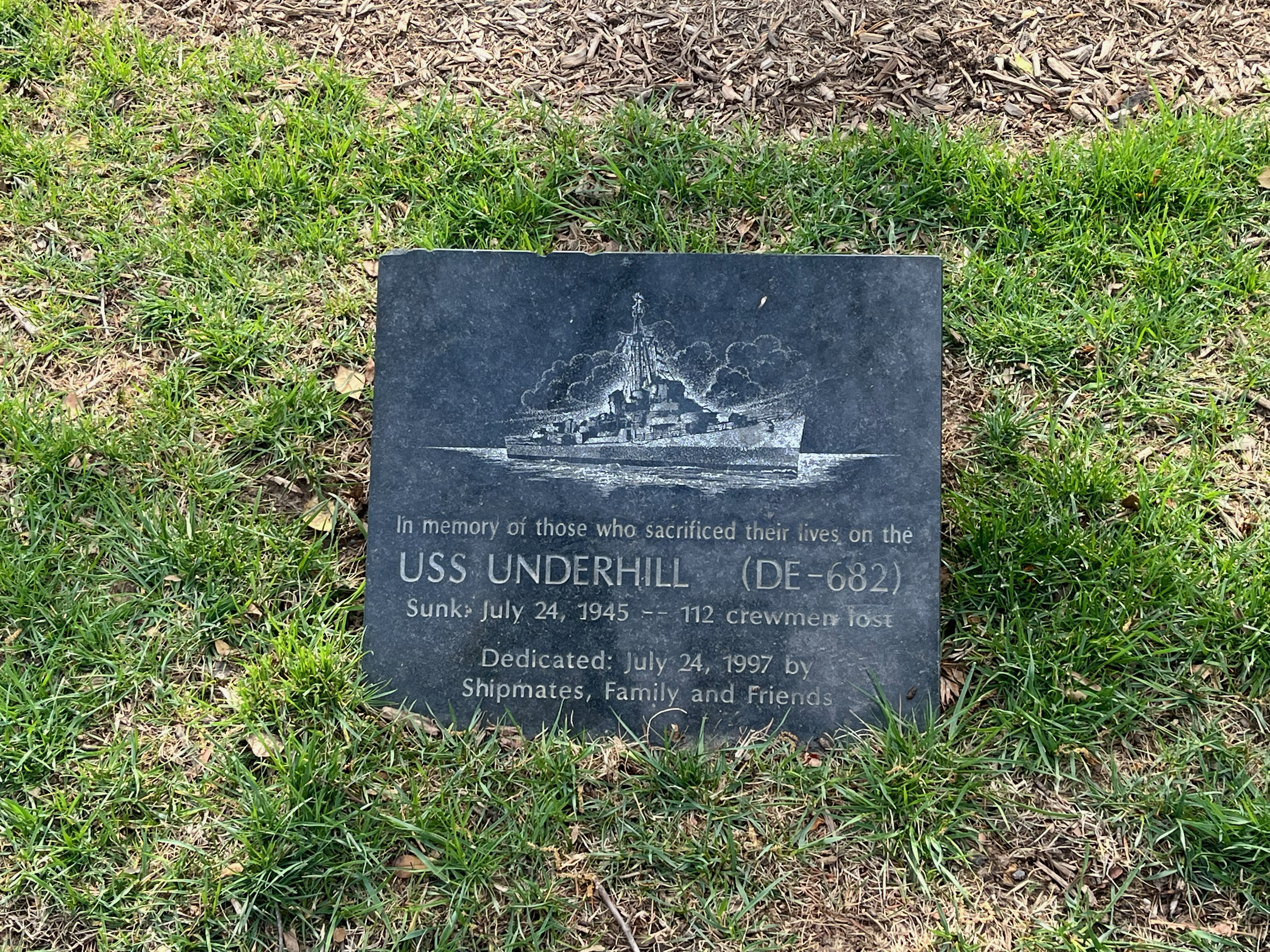
Memorial to the 112 Underhill crewmen who died, Arlington National Cemetery

A total of 112 crew members of Underhill perished in the explosion, while 122 survived. Ten of the fourteen officers were lost, including the commanding officer, Lieutenant Commander Newcomb. Every crewman was awarded the Purple Heart, and Newcomb also received the Silver Star. Chief Boatswain's Mate Stanley Dace was posthumously awarded the bronze star with combat "V" and citation of merit in August 1998. One other shipmate, Pharmacist's Mate Third class Joseph Manory, was awarded the Navy and Marine Commendation Medal with Combat "V" in 1998.

Just six days after the sinking of the Underhill, the heavy cruiser Indianapolis was attacked and sunk in the area by a Japanese submarine. The historical film USS Indianapolis: Men of Courage (2016), dramatizing the incident, also includes a mention of the Underhill and of how it did not affect the order to not give the Indianapolis a sonar and an escort.

USS Underhill was struck from the Naval Vessel Register on 1 September 1945.
