= Kaiten Memorial Museum =

Japanese museum

- 回天記念館
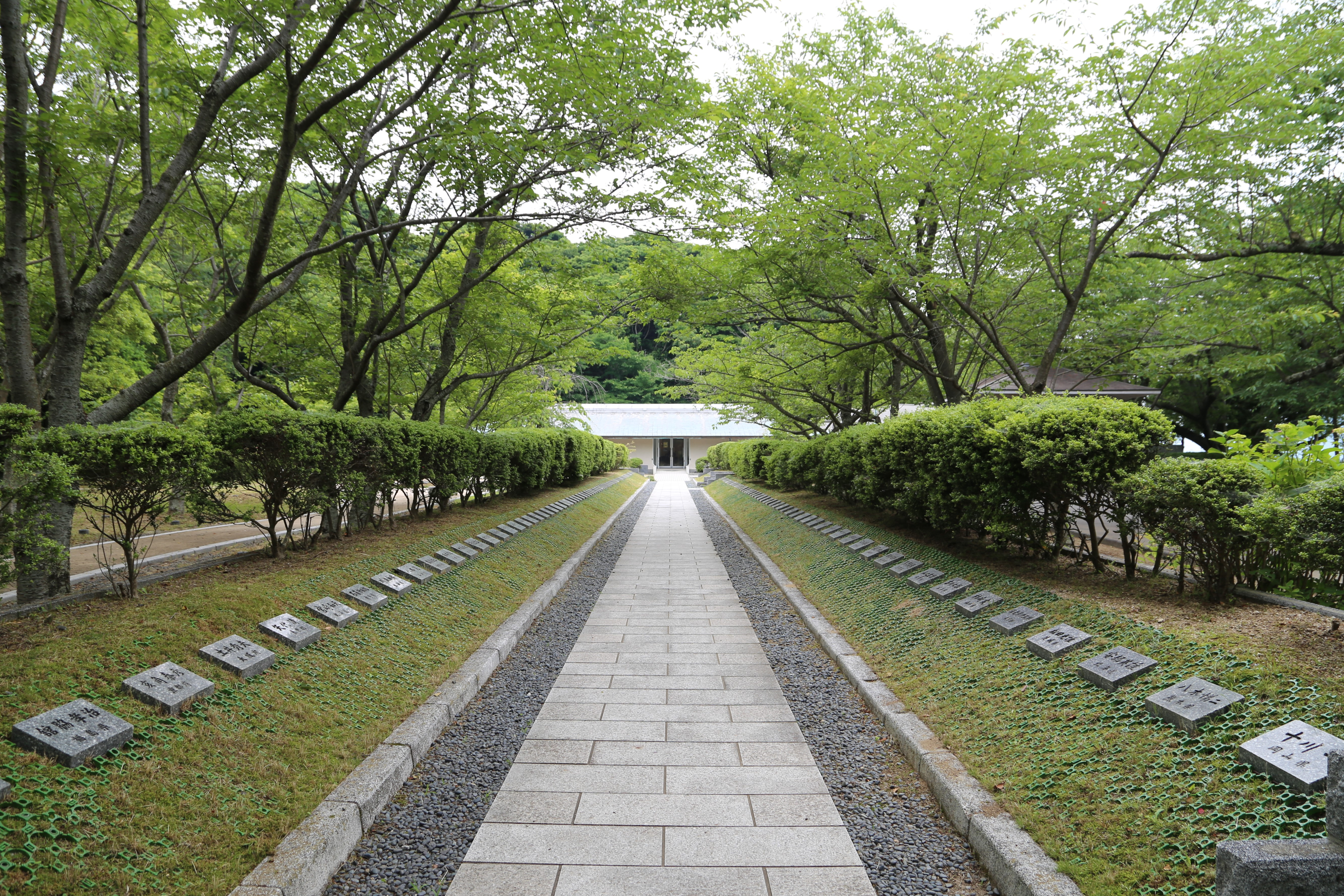

- Location within Japan

General information
- Location: 1960 Ōzushima, Shūnan, Yamaguchi Prefecture, Japan
- Coordinates: 33°59′36″N 131°43′03″E
- Opened: 1968
- Renovated: 1998

Website
- Official website (ja)

Kaiten Memorial Museum (回天記念館, Kaiten Kinen-kan) is a museum on the island of Ōzushima in the Inland Sea, in Shūnan, Yamaguchi Prefecture, Japan, dedicated to the history and memory of the Kaiten, a Special Attack Unit of the Imperial Japanese Navy. The museum first opened near the remains of the island's training base in 1968, reopening in today's building in 1998. The collection of some one thousand items includes wills, letters, uniforms, personal belongings, and photographs. The displays combine these exhibits with information panels on the background and history of the unit and the lives of those served in it. The museum is "a facility for learning about Peace through the minds and hearts of the Kaiten". (Note: 「「回天」の心を通じ平和について学習する施設」)

== See also ==
- Setonaikai National Park
- Chiran Peace Museum for Kamikaze Pilots
- Bansei Tokkō Peace Museum
- Japanese Special Attack Units
- Ōkunoshima
