= Ōzushima =

Japanese island

Native name: 大津島
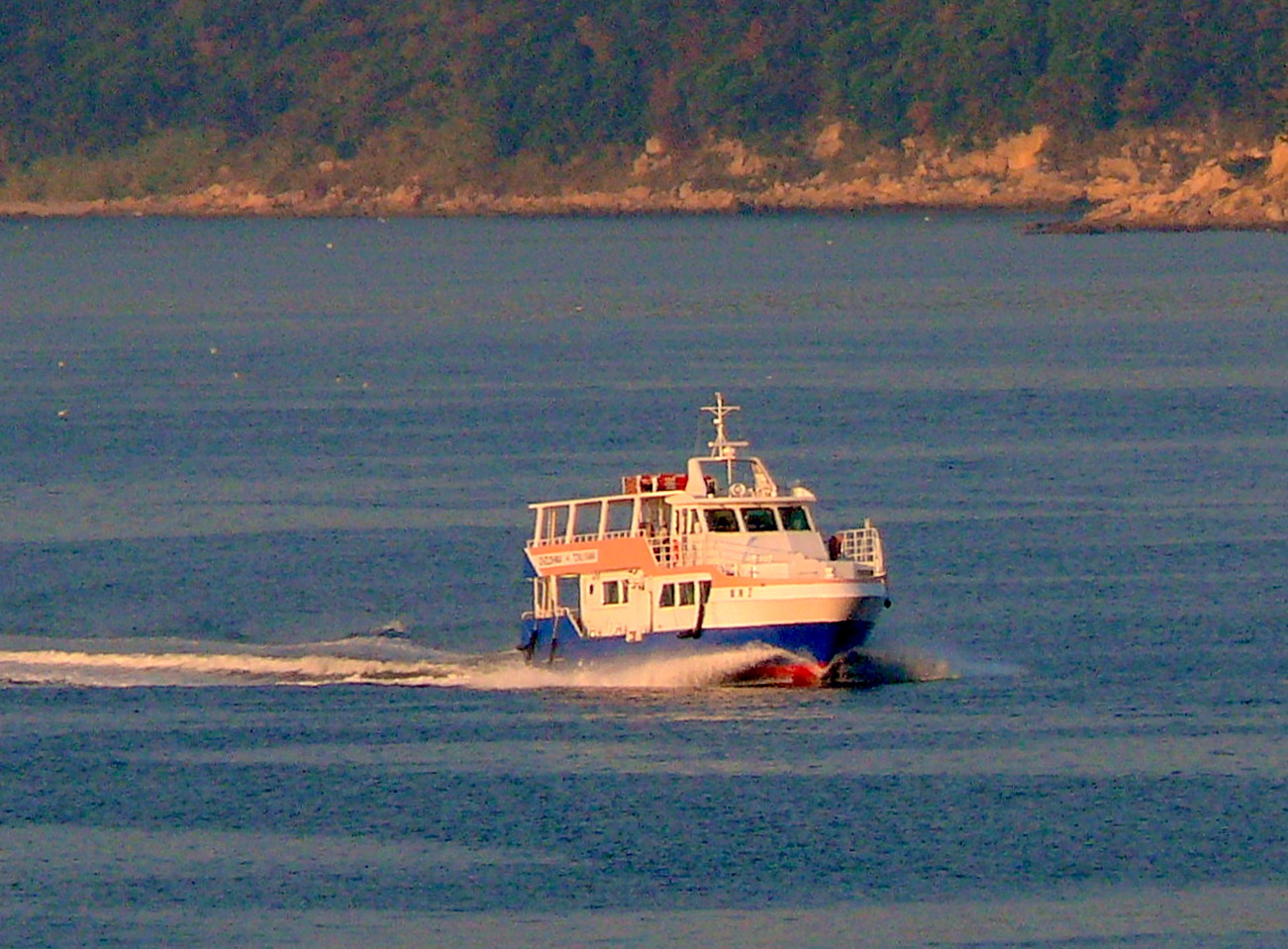
- Ōzushima↔Tokuyama-Kudamatsu ferry plying the Seto Inland Sea (2009)

- Ōzushima (Yamaguchi Prefecture) Ōzushima (Japan)

Geography
- Location: Seto Inland Sea, Japan
- Coordinates: 34°00′18″N 131°42′27″E
- Archipelago: Japanese archipelago
- Area: 4.77 km^{2} (1.84 sq mi)
- Highest elevation: 186 m (610 ft)
- Highest point: Mount Ōzu (大津山)

Administration
- Japan
- Prefecture: Yamaguchi Prefecture
- City: Shūnan

Demographics
- Population: 227 (26 May 2020)

Ōzushima (大津島), or Ozu Island, is an inhabited island in the Inland Sea, Japan. Administratively, it forms part of the city of Shūnan, Yamaguchi Prefecture. Ōzushima is also known as "Kaiten Island".

== Geography ==
Situated in the Seto Inland Sea across the exit from Tokuyama Bay and formerly two islands, Ōzushima and Mashima (馬島) are said to have become one some four hundred years ago. Gently curved, long, and thin, and with a outline that somewhat resembles a misshapen Y, today's Ōzushima extends some 10 kilometres (6.2 mi) from north to south, and has an area of 4.77 square kilometres (1.84 sq mi). There are a number of small settlements along the coast, including Setohama (瀬戸浜) and Kario (刈尾), the centres for the island's masons and stoneworkers, the farming communities of Motoura (本浦) and Amagaura (天ヶ浦), and the fishing hamlets of Yanagigaura (柳ヶ浦) and Mashima (馬島). Parks on the island include Ōzushima Park and Mashima Park, while part of the island and its surrounding waters is protected within Setonaikai National Park. The southern coastline is suffering from severe coastal erosion.

== Flora ==
On Mashima, the southern end of the island, may be found a five-petalled variety of narcissus known as yama-suisen (ヤマスイセン). Bulrushes (as featured in the myth of the Hare of Inaba) grow a short distance from Setohama port in paddies that were brought into cultivation during the Edo period but now lie abandoned, while at Amagaura there is a kyoju (巨樹) or celebrated old-growth tree, a Camellia japonica some three hundred years old, 9 metres (30 ft) in height, and 2 metres (6 ft 7 in) in circumference.

== History ==
The name of the recently formed city of Shūnan, in which Ōzushima is located, is a portmanteau of two characters (周南) that denote its situation in the south of old Suō Province. In early-modern times, Ōzushima formed part of Tonda (富田) (once territory owned by Tōdai-ji), a flourishing market town along the San'yōdō in Tokuyama Domain, the daimyō of which came from a branch of the Mōri clan, lords of Chōshū (or Hagi) Domain.

Like nearby Kurokami-jima (黒髪島), Ōzushima is a good source of high-grade granite, which was quarried for Ōsaka Castle: one block (whether cut for its original construction by Toyotomi Hideyoshi, as part of Mōri Terumoto's contribution, or for its rebuilding, by Tokugawa Hidetada after the Siege of Osaka, still lies on the island, 6 metres (20 ft) in length, 1 metre (3 ft 3 in) both in width and height, and weighing some 6 metric tons (5.9 long tons; 6.6 short tons).

In 1748, a ship from Nokonoshima (能古島), an island in Hakata Bay, involved in the Kuroda Domain rice trade, and laden with rice, foundered off the island; ten bodies washed ashore and were buried on Ōzushima; five of their gravestones are inscribed, attesting to contact between the two sets of islanders—some of the stones were sent from Nokonoshima; the ten are honoured in an annual memorial service on the occasion of Tanabata.

During the Great Pacific War, the island served as a testing and training base for the Imperial Japanese Navy's Special Attack submarine force, the Kaiten (manned torpedoes). With its origins as a testing range from 1938 for the Type 93 "oxygen torpedo", for construction of the Kaiten base, eight large caissons were towed over from Ōita Prefecture, the first in October 1943, the last in October 1944, with five further small caissons produced on Ōzushima. Opening in September 1944, this base was the first of what would be four such facilities (the others following in nearby Hikari, in November, and Hirao, in March, Ōga Kaiten Base (大神回天基地) opening in what is now Hiji, Ōita Prefecture, in May 1945). Remains of the base on Ōzushima include a tunnel 250 metres (820 ft) in length and 4 metres (13 ft) in height, cut through the rock and used to transfer Kaiten by a rail tack to and from the maintenance area, maintenance facilities that extend from the port area of Mashima to the now closed Ōzushima Elementary School, an electricity transformer station, concrete bridges, staircases, an observation station on a rise overlooking the torpedo testing area, a firing test evaluation office, a storage facility for hazardous materials, kitchens, and barracks; there was also a seaplane hangar, while walls were built to keep out the islanders and maintain secrecy as to the operations within. As confirmed by base members and attested by archive materials, the Yamato could be seen clearly from the torpedo observation station at her final anchorage some 3.2 kilometres (2.0 mi) off the southeast coast before departure on her final mission. Also on the island, and surviving in part, developed between November 1941 and May 1943 to protect Tokuyama Port and other nearby military facilities, on the summit of Mount Ōzu, the island's highest point, was an anti-aircraft battery, which in 1943 had five guns and a detail of fifty-four men.

In recognition of its historic significance, the Ōzushima Former Kaiten Firing and Training Base was in 2006 listed as a Civil Engineering Heritage Site (土木遺産) by the Japan Society of Civil Engineers. Also, it is due to this element of Ōzushima's past, commemorated at the Kaiten Memorial Museum, surrounded by cherries that flower and fall in the spring, that the island is sometimes referred to as "Kaiten Island".

Post-war and in recent decades, the demographic changes affecting the country have seen Ōzushima's population decline from a few thousand to a couple of hundred (269 in 2009, 227 in 2020), with many of those remaining of retirement age.

== Intangible Heritage ==
- Heike Odori dances, performed for the souls of the vanquished Taira (Heike) clan, some of the survivors having settled on Ōzushima
- Ōzushima Nagamochi-uta (大津島長持唄) song: documentation and performance activities are being carried out by a preservation society
- Okō ceremonies for Bunshichi (文七御講), a pauper, but honest and with a strong faith, who poured himself into carving Buddhist statues, and thus at least became rich in merit (at the temple of Kōman-ji (光満寺) in Motoura, to which he left all his worldly goods, a memorial service is still performed on the last day of Hōonkō)
- The legend of Santarō (三太郎伝説), the master mason, who, when the locals were at a quandary as to how best to go about transporting the stones for Ōsaka Castle, fanned them with his fan, at which point, as if rising up and floating, they spontaneously betook themselves to and piled themselves upon rafts along the shore (a small hokora shrine dedicated to Santarō remains to this day at Setohama)

== Economy ==
Cultivation of tobacco and mikan was once widespread. Output now includes marine products, such as hijiki and wakame seaweed, sweet potatoes, and sake (marketed under the label Kaiten (回天)). There is also generally low-impact tourism: in 2006, following the release of Yokoyama Hideo's Sea Without Exit (出口のない海, Deguchi no nai umi) (filmed in part on Ōzushima and centred around the story of Wada Minoru (和田稔), who died when his submarine training vehicle accidentally sank, before washing ashore after the Surrender) nearly twenty-five thousand visited the island's Kaiten Memorial Museum, an increase of over sixty percent on the three years before.

== Meibutsu ==
Tokusanhin (a form of meibutsu) include Tsushima (つしま), a dish involving broiled carrot, gobō (burdock), and tōfu, seasoned with shōyu (Japanese soy sauce), that is said to have originated on Tsushima (Nagasaki Prefecture); and kanpyō-mochi (かんぴょう餅), which, despite the name, are made using the island's heritage sweet potatoes.

== Transportation ==
There is a ferry link to Tokuyama-Kudamatsu Port (徳山下松港) on Honshū; this is serviced by the JR West-operated Tokuyama Station, on the San'yō Shinkansen and San'yō Main Lines. As of May 2020, there were two vessels and seven crossings a day.

== Related maps and images ==
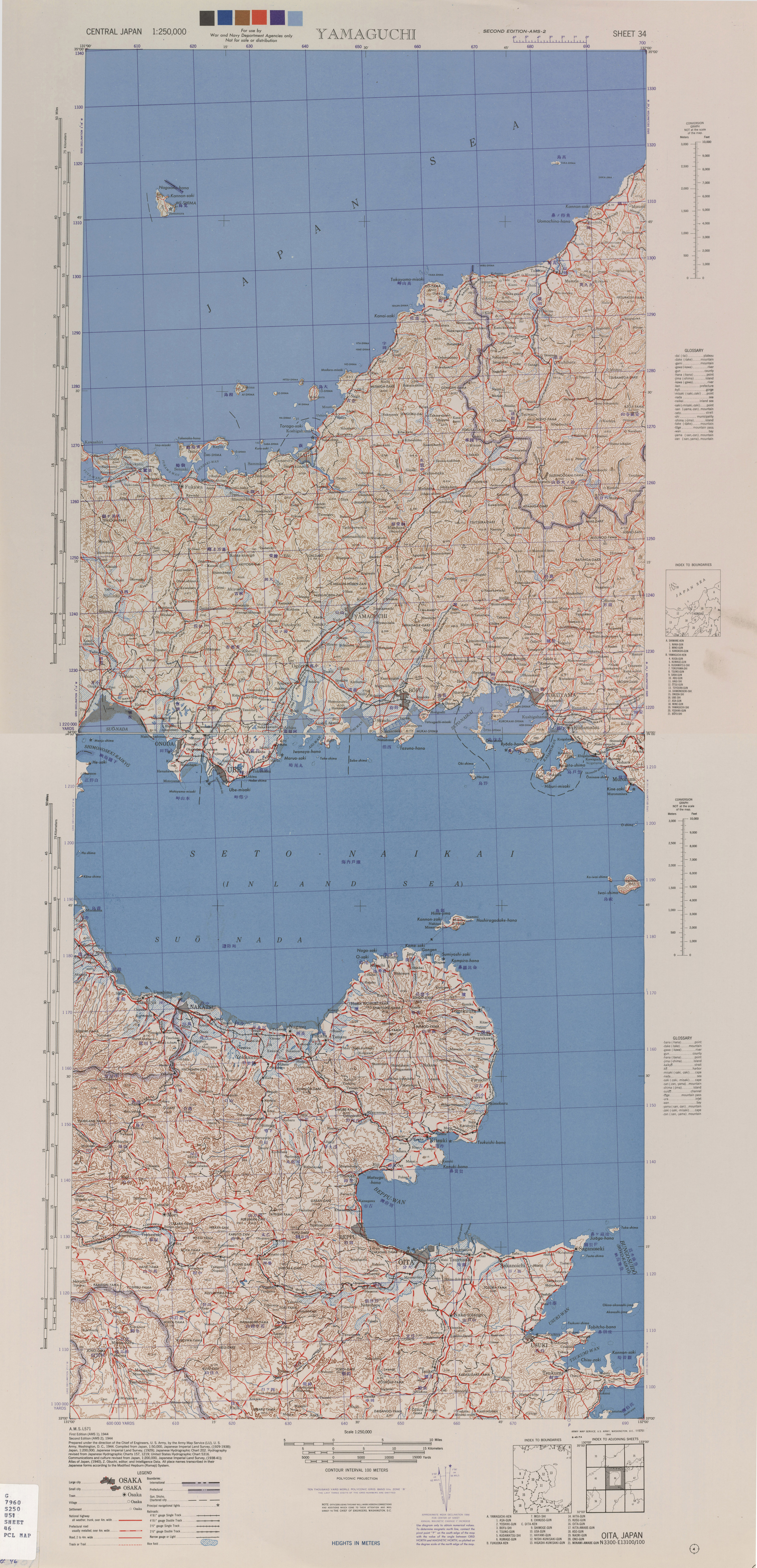
Composite of two US AMS 1943 maps, showing the location of "Ōtsu-shima", on the join a third from the right, across the mouth of Tokuyama Bay; the Kunisaki Peninsula in Ōita Prefecture is across the Inland Sea to the south

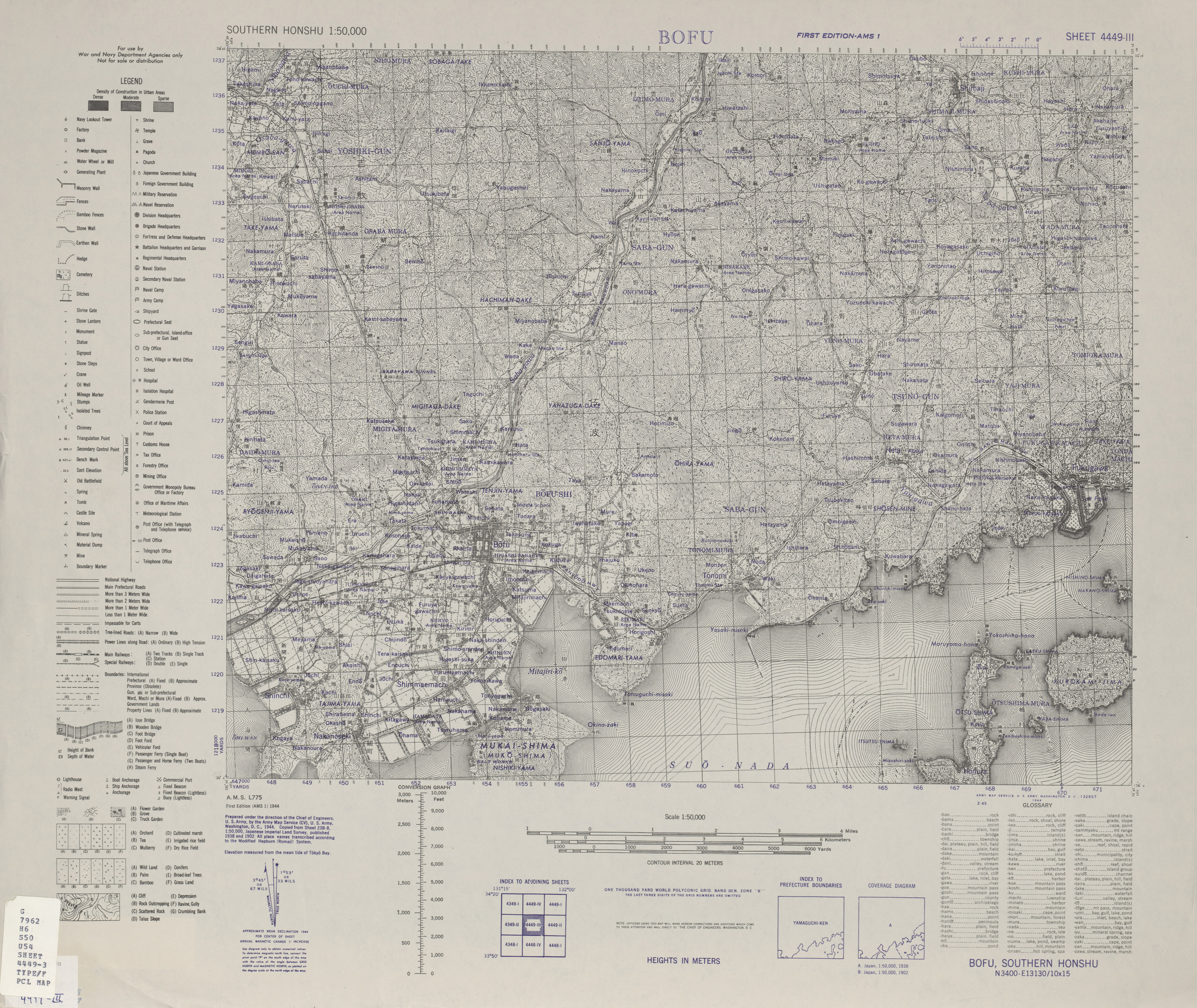
1944 US AMS map showing, to the bottom right, the northern half of "Ōtsu-shima"

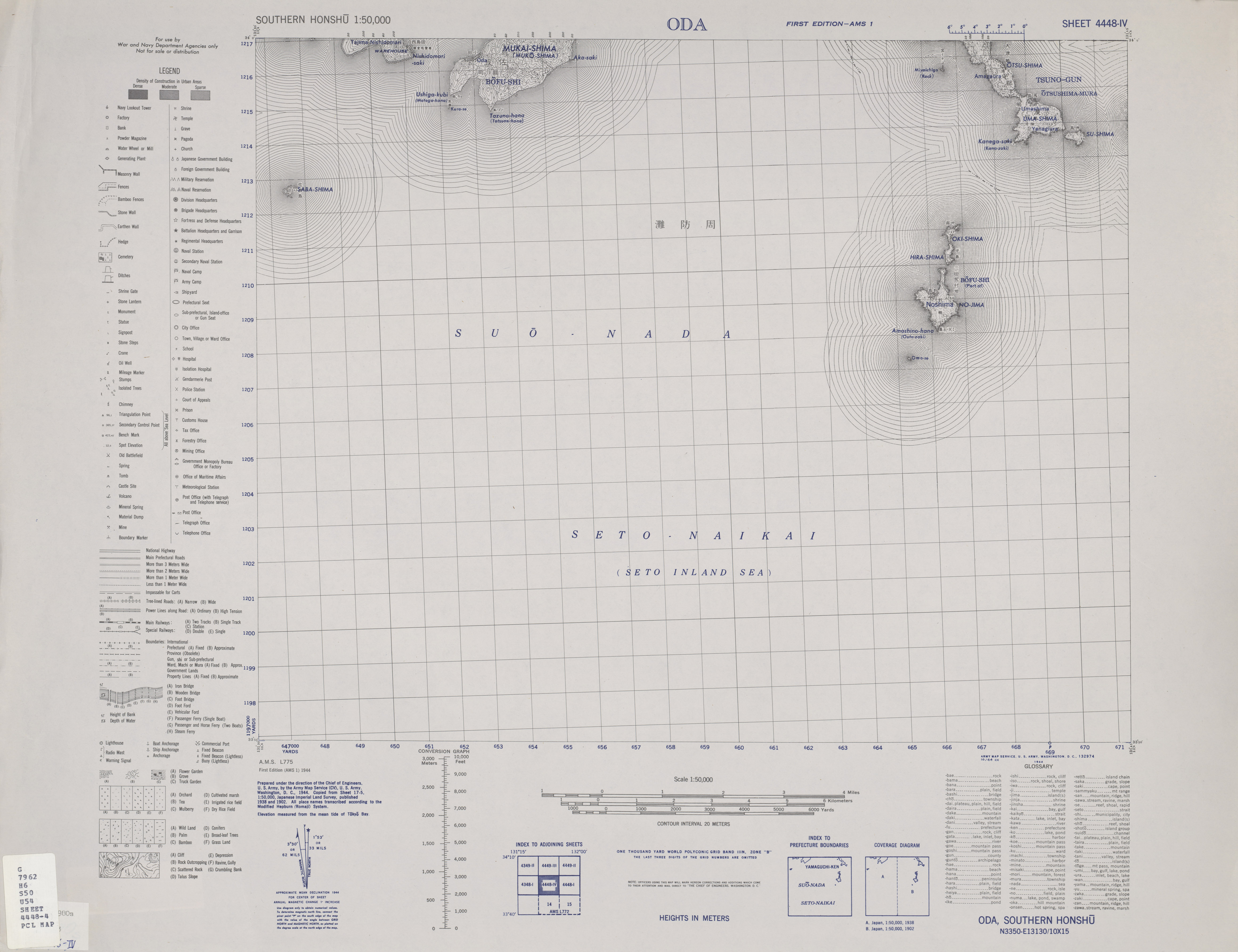
1944 US AMS map showing, to the top right, the southern half of "Ōtsu-shima"

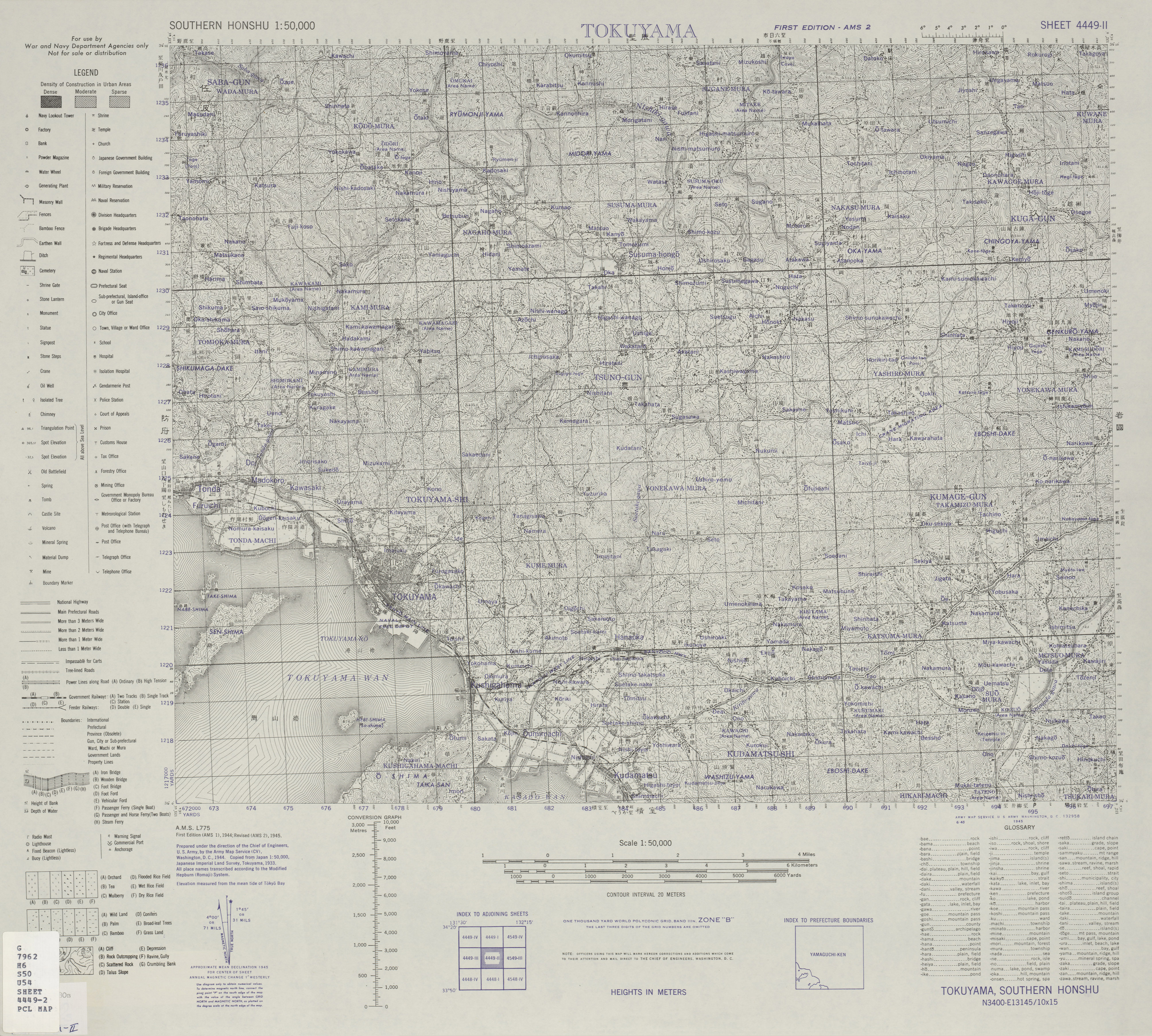
1945 US AMS map showing, to the east of the previous pair and to the bottom left, Tokuyama and Tokuyama Wan (Bay)

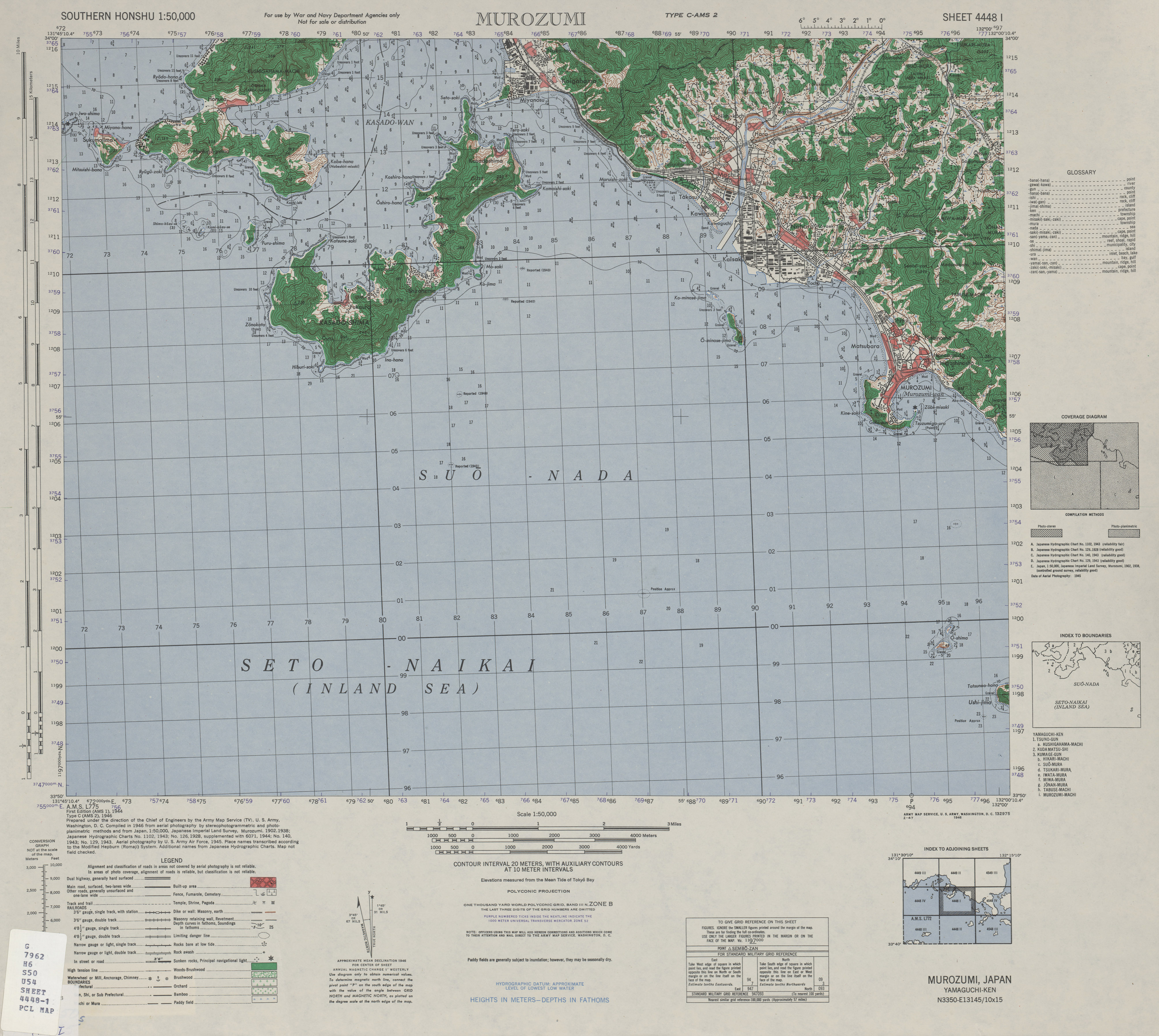
1946 US AMS map from the time of the Occupation showing, to the south of the previous map and to the top left, the tip of the southern arm of Tokuyama Bay and Sukumo-jima, a little to the east of Ōzushima

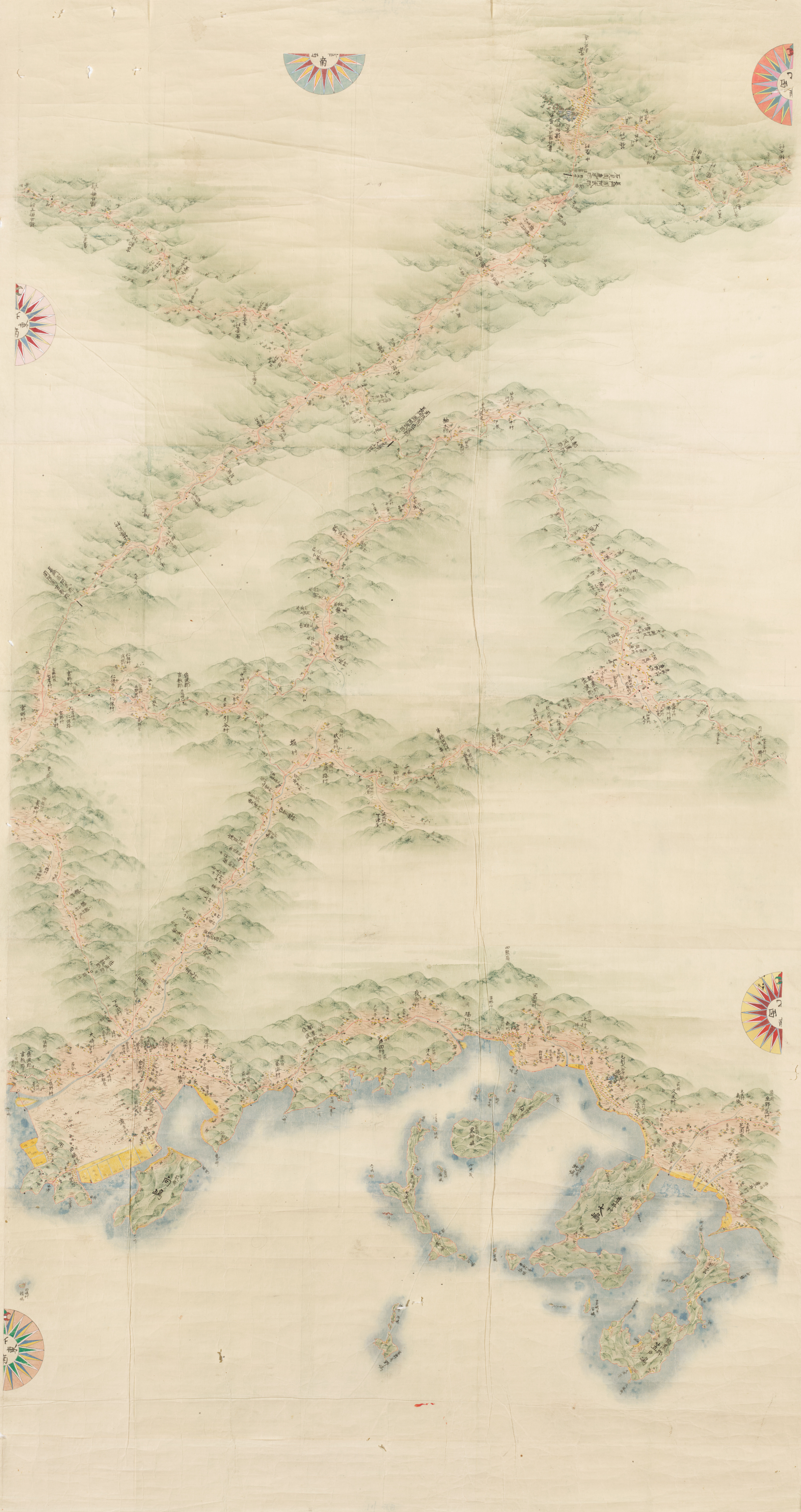
Map dating to before the abolition of the han system and formerly owned by the Mōri clan, marked with Ōzushima (大津島) and Mashima (馬島) (Yamaguchi Prefectural Archives)

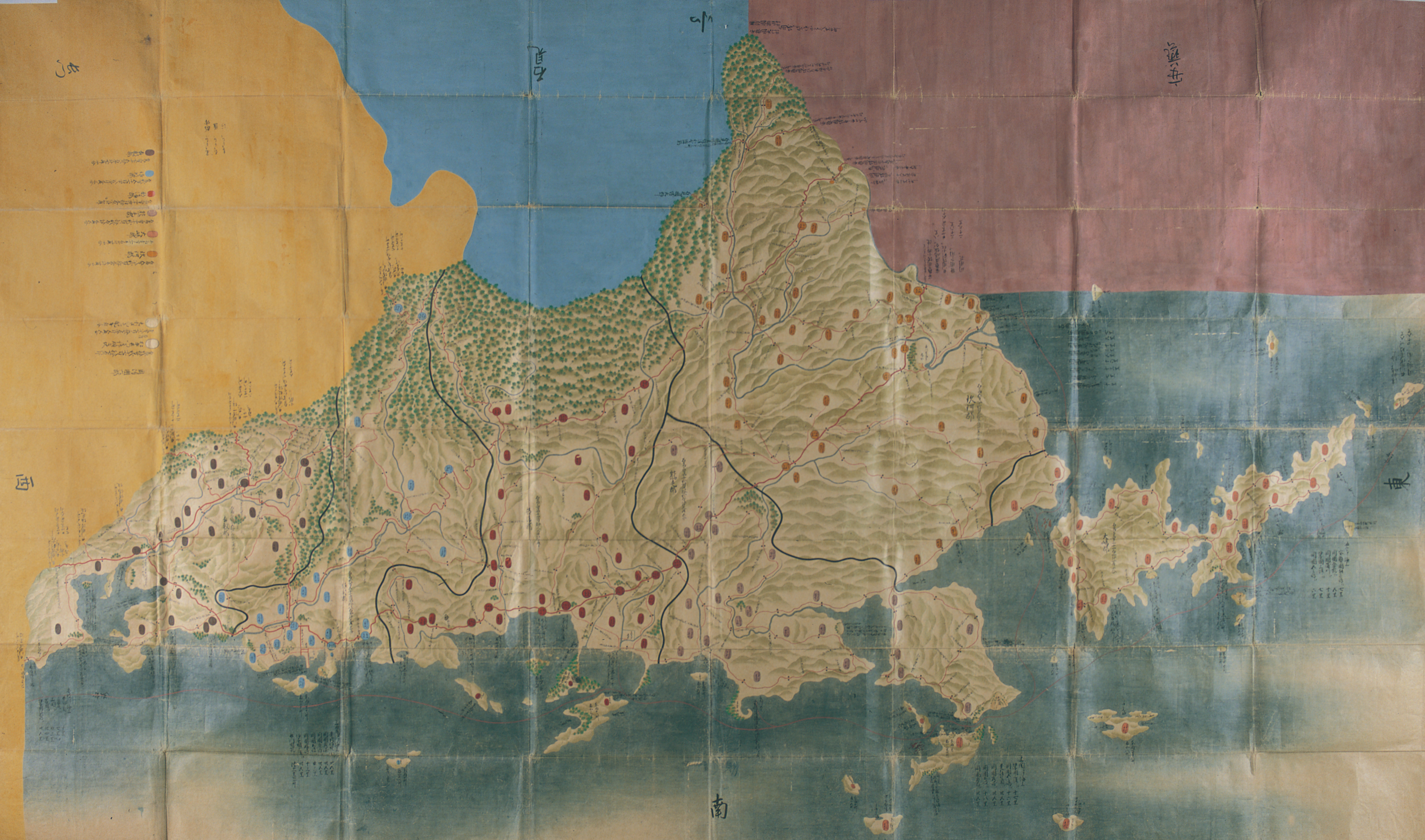
Shōhō Kuniezu - Suō Province, showing water between Ōzushima and Mashima (Yamaguchi Prefectural Archives)

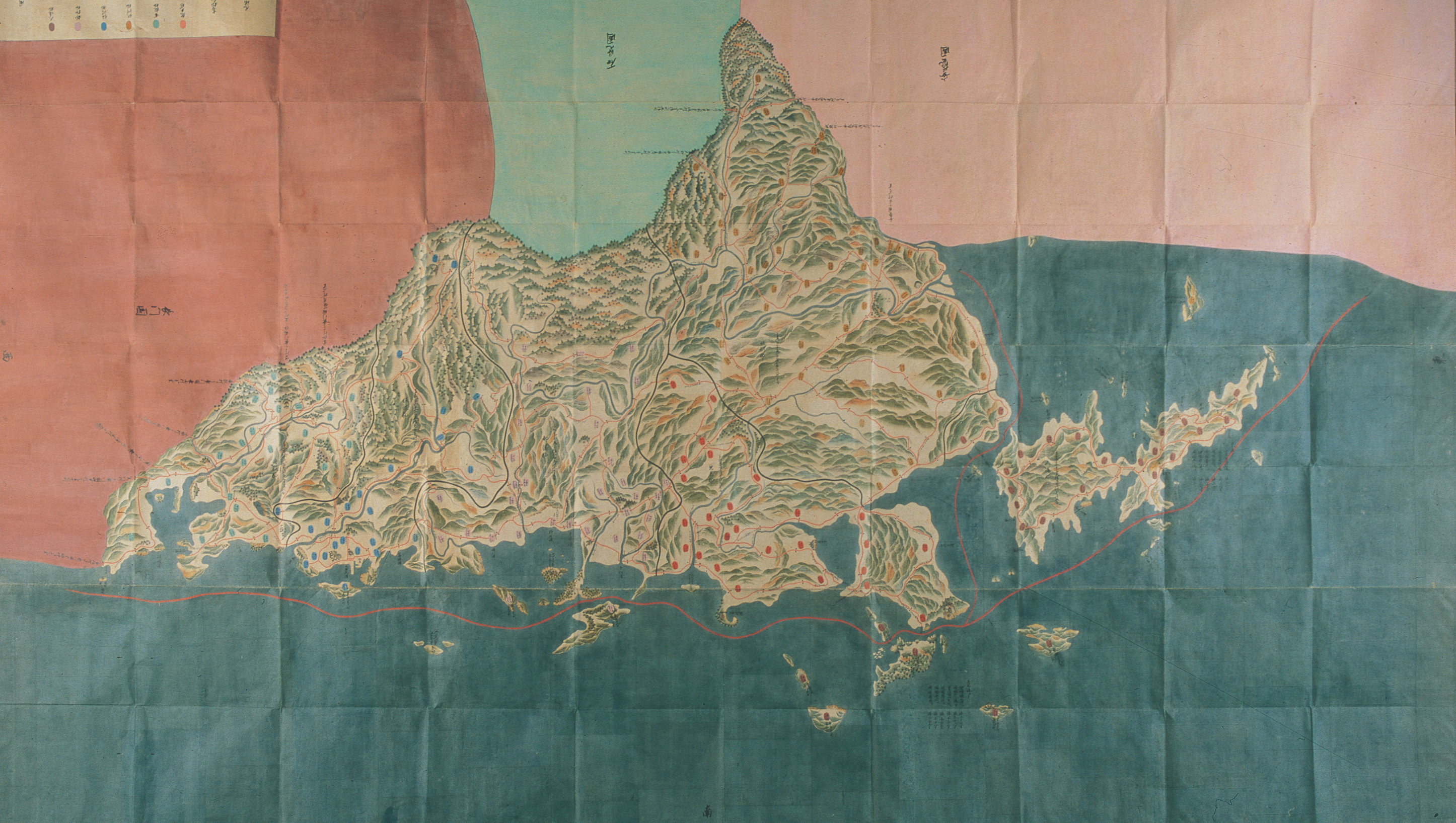
Genroku Kuniezu - Suō Province, with Nagato in red, Iwami in green, and Aki in pink (Yamaguchi Prefectural Archives)

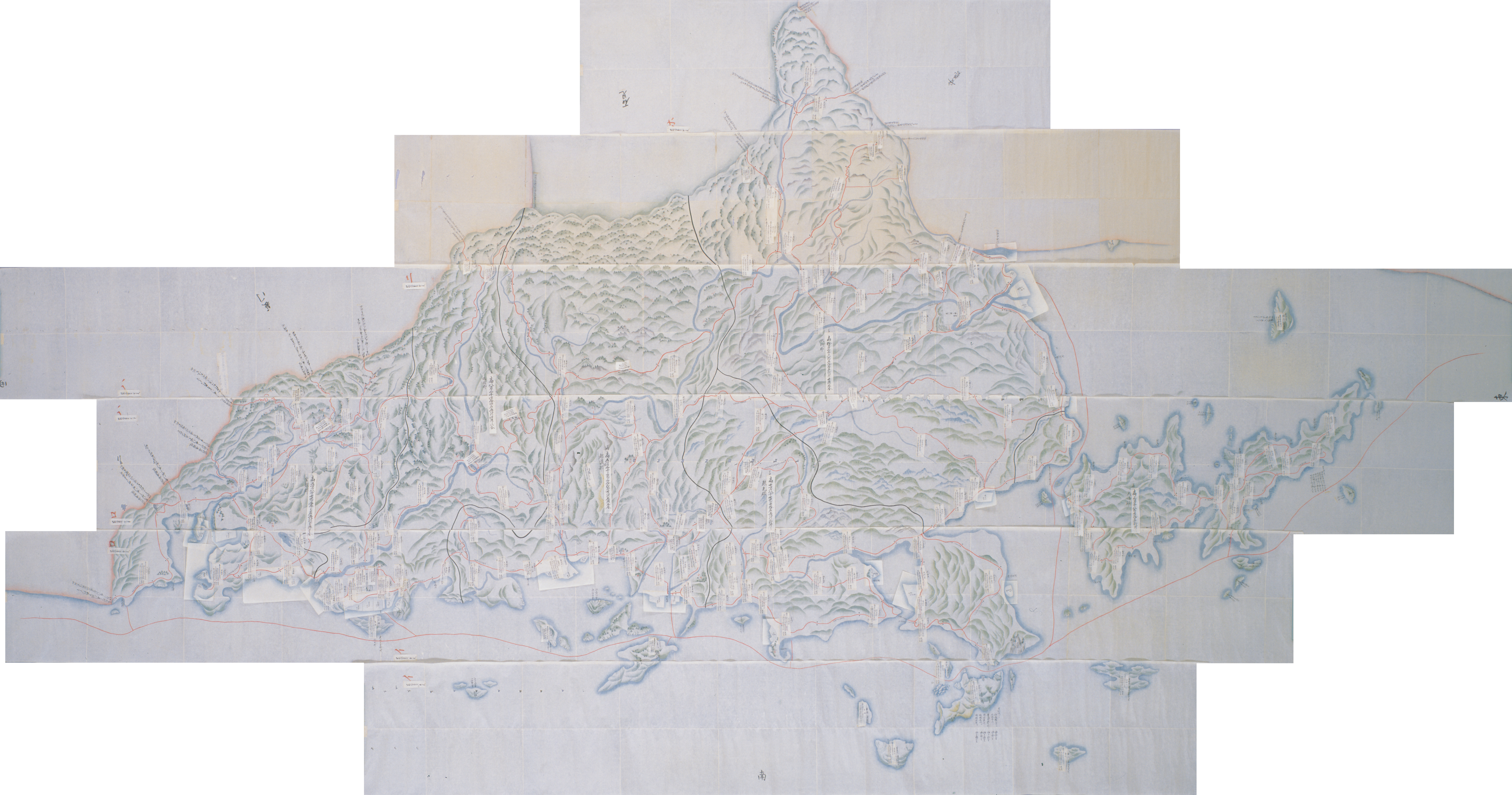
Tenpō Kuniezu - Suō Province (Yamaguchi Prefectural Archives)

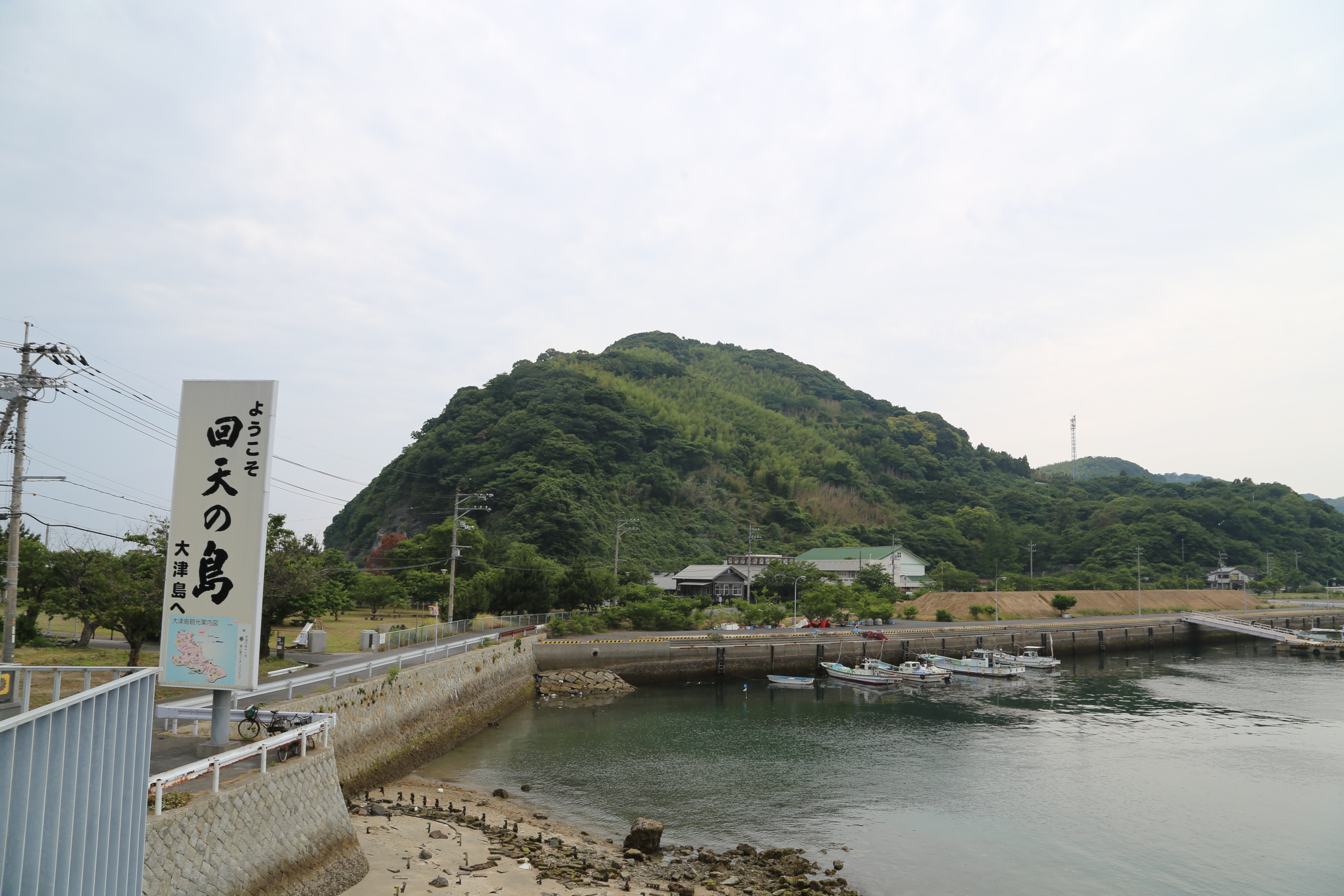
View from Ōzushima Port, with a sign saying "Welcome to Kaiten Island, Ōzushima"

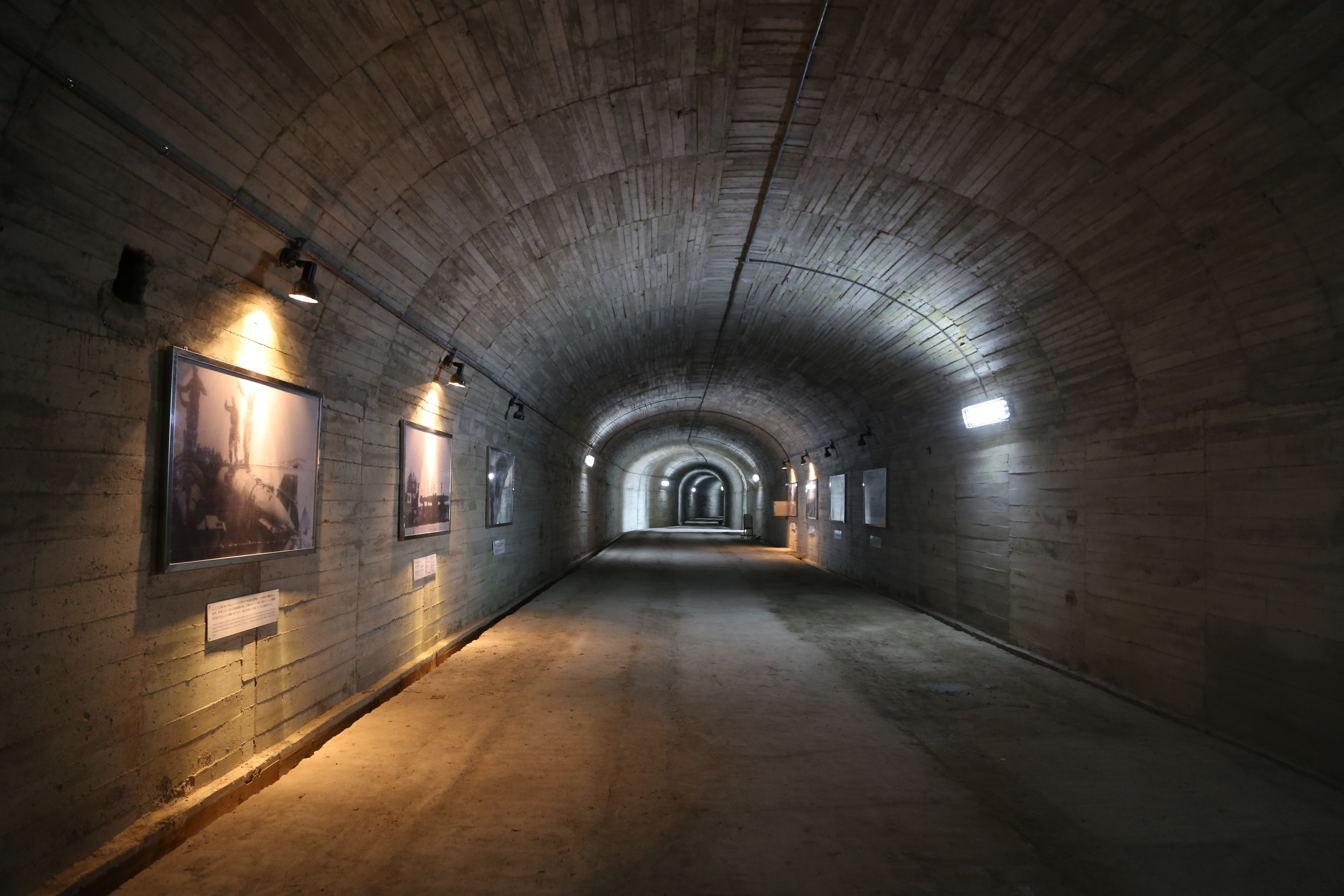
Tunnel from the days of the Kaiten training base

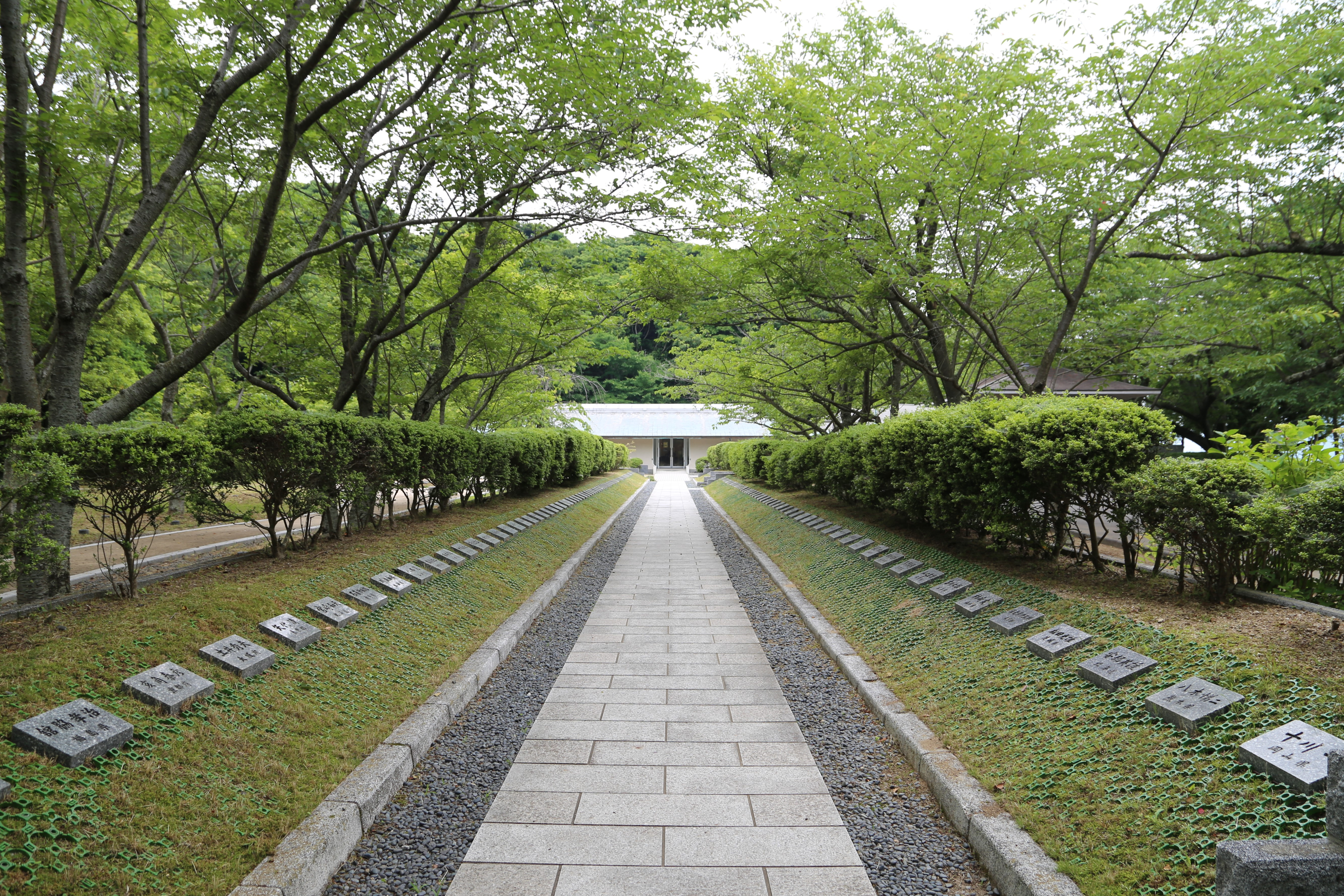
The approach to Kaiten Memorial Museum

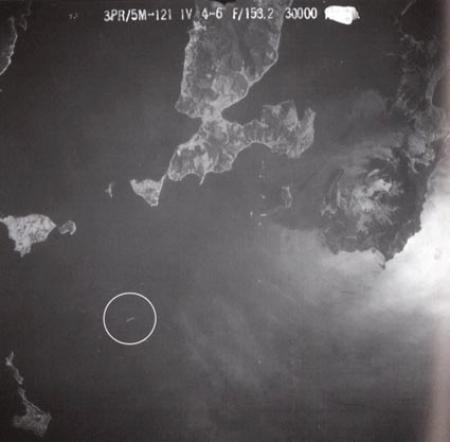
The Yamato at 09:47 on 6 April 1945, hours before departing on her final mission; Mashima can be seen above to the left

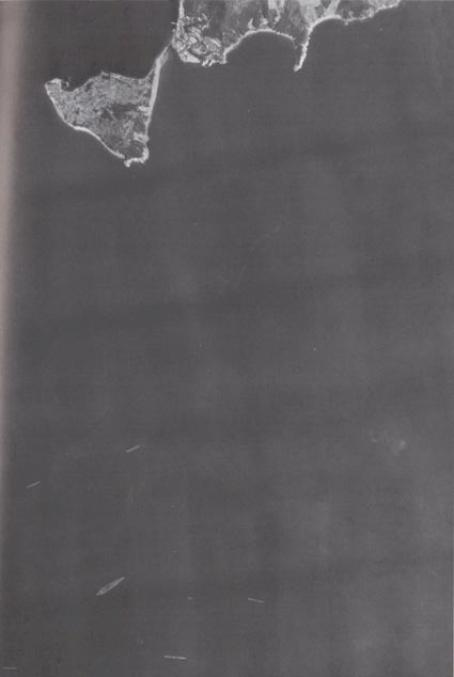
Magnification of the previous image

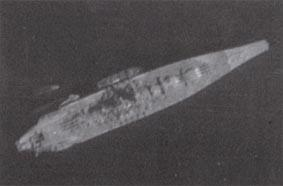
Magnification of the previous image

== See also ==
- Setonaikai National Park
- Etajima, Ōkunoshima, Hashima
- Yasukuni Jinja Yūshūkan
- Chiran Peace Museum for Kamikaze Pilots
- Noshima
