= Potassium cuprocyanide =

Names
- Other names: Copper(I) potassium cyanide; Cuprous potassium cyanide; Potassium copper(I) cyanide; Potassium dicyanocuprate

Identifiers
CAS Number	13682-73-0
3D model (JSmol)	Interactive image
ChemSpider	19968652
EC Number	237-192-2
PubChem CID	61666
UN number	1679
- InChI: InChI=1S/2CN.Cu.K/c2*1-2;;/q2*-1;2*+1 Key: IVDPWEKOUUEEBD-UHFFFAOYSA-N
- SMILES: [C-]#N.[C-]#N.[K+].[Cu+]

Properties
Chemical formula	C_{2}CuKN_{2}
Molar mass	154.680 g·mol^{−1}
Appearance	white solid
Solubility in water	soluble

Hazards
- GHS labelling
Pictograms	(GHS06: Toxic) (GHS09: Environmental hazard)
Signal word	Danger
Hazard statements	H300, H310, H330, H410
Precautionary statements	P260, P262, P264, P270, P271, P273, P280, P284, P301+P316, P302+P352, P304+P340, P316, P320, P321, P330, P361+P364, P391, P403+P233, P405, P501
- NIOSH (US health exposure limits)
PEL (Permissible)	5.0 mg/m^{3}, as CN
IDLH (Immediate danger)	25.0 mg/m^{3}, as CN
- Except where otherwise noted, data are given for materials in their standard state (at 25 °C [77 °F], 100 kPa). Infobox references

Potassium cuprocyanide is an inorganic compound with the chemical formula KCu(CN)_{2}. It is a white solid. It has found use in copper plating baths. Its crystalline structure consists of helical chains of copper atoms in their +1 oxidation state, where each pair is linked by a cyanide (Cu−C≡N−Cu). Each carbon is also coordinated to a non-bridging cyanide, with the potassium atoms scattered adjacently to hold the adjacent chains together.
