= Amphibious assault submarine =

Theoretical submarine equivalent of an amphibious assault ship

An amphibious assault submarine is a theoretical submarine equivalent of an amphibious assault ship. While such ships have been proposed in the past by both the United States and the Soviet Union, none has ever been built (though at least one of the larger Soviet designs did start construction). Converted or standard submarines have often been used to transport small groups of soldiers or supplies, such as the cruiser submarines of the Imperial Japanese Navy.

== In Imperial Japan ==
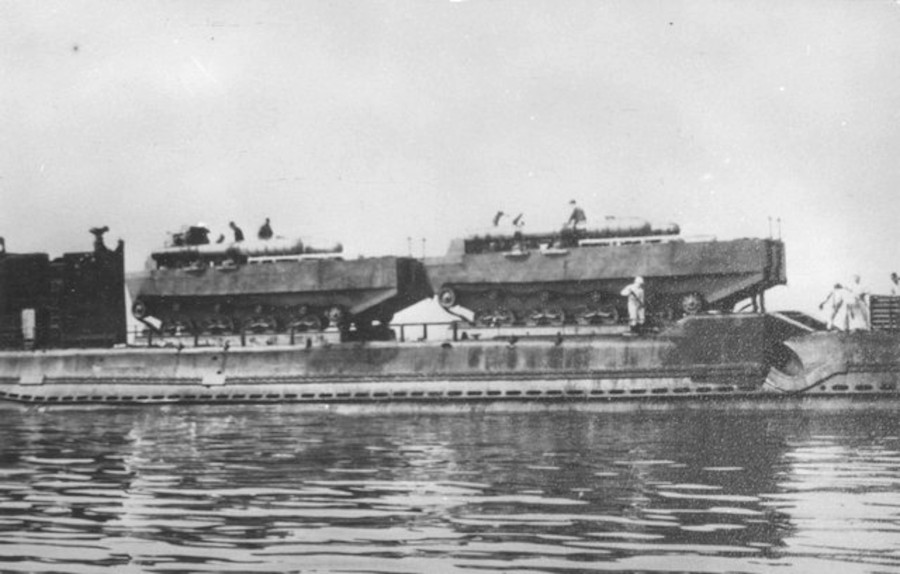
TwoType 4 Ka-Tsu with torpedoes on the deck of a IJN submarine

Most of the Imperial Japanese Navy's cruiser submarines (Junsen Types) were capable of carriying floatplanes for reconnaissance and sometimes limited air strikes, as well as carrying several amphibious landing craft.

This capacity was notably planned to be used during the "Operation Tatsumaki", were in May 1944, called for the submarines I-36, I-38, I-41, I-44 and I-53 to transport modified Type 4 Ka-Tsu amphibious tracked landing craft, each armed with two 450 mm (18 in) torpedoes, from Kure to Majuro. After the submarines launched the Ka-Tsu vehicles, the operation called for the vehicles to proceed to shore, move overland across the atoll's islands, then enter the water in the lagoon and attack Allied ships with torpedoes. Operation Tatsumaki later was postponed pending the correction of defects found in the Ka-Tsu vehicles and eventually was canceled entirely.

== In the Soviet Union ==
The Soviet Union had some experiences using submarines to shuttle weapons, supplies and special forces into besieged areas or behind enemy lines in World War II, specifically during the siege of Sevastopol.

=== Project 621 ===
After the war, in 1948, Project 621 was proposed as a landing ship-transport submarine to set down troops behind enemy lines. With some 5,950 tons, the underwater giant would have been one of the largest submarines of its day. On its two vehicle decks, it was to carry a full infantry battalion of 745 troops, 10 T-34 tanks, 12 trucks, 12 towed cannons, and 3 catapult-launched La-5 fighter aircraft for air cover. The troops and vehicles meanwhile would be unloaded over a bow ramp when the submarine beached on the surface.

=== Project 664 ===
While Project 621 was not built, follow-up designs got even larger and even more ambitious, though this was eventually to be their downfall as well. The additional capabilities, from being expected to do underway replenishment for other submarines to being capable of providing submarine rescue tended to delay the projects which were otherwise considered fully feasible. At least one, Project 664, started construction at Severodvinsk in 1964, but the mixed requirements of replenishment, transport, and mine-laying caused major complications in combination, even with the proposed nuclear propulsion.

=== Project 748 ===
In the late 1960s, another proposal, Project 748, neared construction, a nuclear-powered assault transport (with less added requirements than previous designs) of up to 11,000 tons. This submarine was to carry up to 20 amphibious tanks and BTR-60P armored personnel carriers, and up to 470 troops, with the vehicles stored in double-deck hulls contained to both sides of the main hull, all three within an outer shell. The submarine was to be equipped with a torpedo armament of four bow 21 in (530 mm) torpedo tubes (18 to 20 torpedoes stored) as well as anti-aircraft guns and surface-to-air missiles. It also was to have mine-laying capabilities.

In the end, while the shipyards had already begun to prepare for the production of five submarines of the 748 type, this project was also scrapped in the early 1970s, as the manufacturing capacity was needed for new ballistic missile submarines.

The ideas proposed during these projects helped drive the proposals for nuclear-powered merchant submarines by Russian design offices in the 1990s.

== In the United States ==
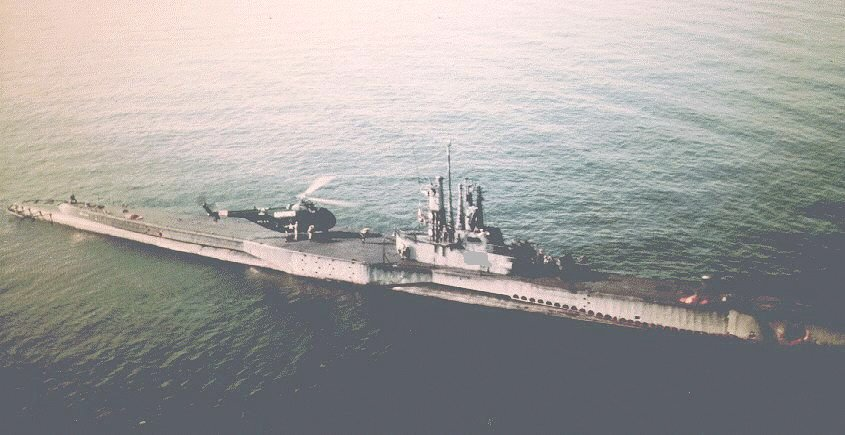
USS Sealion (SS-315) tested helicopter operations in 1956.

The U.S. Navy has in the past also undertaken some preliminary design of submarine transports, but never the extent of the Soviet design efforts.

In 1947, the Balao-class submarines USS Sealion (SS-315) and USS Perch (SS-313) were modified as "Submarine Transports", removing the torpedo tubes and forward engines to berth 123 troops or for alternative use as cargo space. The wardroom was redesigned for use as an operating room; the beam aft of the conning tower was extended, and a large watertight cylindrical chamber was installed abaft the conning tower to store amphibious landing equipment—including a tracked landing vehicle (LVT). A helicopter platform was also installed. The hangar and platform were later removed, and the submarines were decommissioned in the following years.

In the 1950s, a 10,000-ton submarine was proposed, 220 m (720 ft) long, and with a beam of 38 m (125 ft). It was to carry 2,240 Marines, landing them using 'amphibious flying platforms' with an undefined propulsion method, supposed to move at 160 km/h (99 mph).

However, many older submarines have been refitted during US naval history into transport submarines, mainly for use in covert operations, i.e., special forces deployment.

== See also ==
- Submarine aircraft carrier
- I-400 class submarine
