= Japanese submarine I-47 =

1st class submarine of the Imperial Japanese Navy

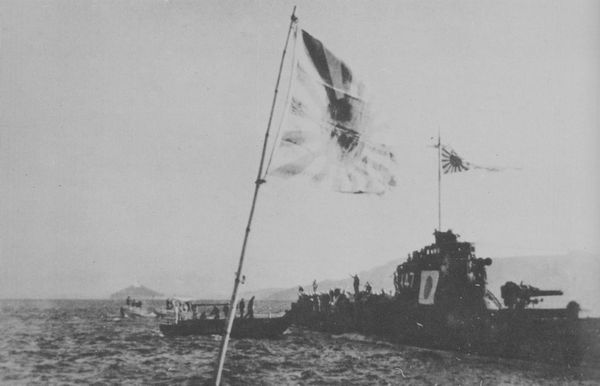
- I-47 at Otsujima Naval Base on 25 December 1944.

History

Empire of Japan
- Name: Submarine No. 377
- Builder: Sasebo Naval Arsenal, Sasebo, Japan
- Laid down: 21 November 1942
- Renamed: I-47 on 31 July 1943
- Launched: 29 September 1943
- Completed: 10 July 1944
- Commissioned: 10 July 1944
- Fate: Surrendered 2 September 1945; Stricken 30 November 1945; Scuttled 1 April 1946

General characteristics
- Class & type: Type C submarine
- Displacement: 2,595 tonnes (2,554 long tons) surfaced; 3,621 tonnes (3,564 long tons) submerged
- Length: 109.3 m (358 ft 7 in) overall
- Beam: 9.1 m (29 ft 10 in)
- Draft: 5.35 m (17 ft 7 in)
- Installed power: 12,400 bhp (9,200 kW) (diesel); 2,000 hp (1,500 kW) (electric motor)
- Propulsion: Diesel-electric; 1 × diesel engine, 751 tons fuel; 1 × electric motor
- Speed: 23.5 knots (43.5 km/h; 27.0 mph) surfaced; 8 knots (15 km/h; 9.2 mph) submerged
- Range: 14,000 nmi (26,000 km; 16,000 mi) at 16 knots (30 km/h; 18 mph) surfaced; 60 nmi (110 km; 69 mi) at 3 knots (5.6 km/h; 3.5 mph) submerged
- Test depth: 100 m (330 ft)
- Crew: 94
- Armament: 8 × bow 533 mm (21 in) torpedo tubes; 1 × 14 cm (5.5 in) deck gun; 2 × single or twin 25 mm (1 in) Type 96 anti-aircraft guns

I-47 (伊47) was the seventh Type C cruiser submarines built for the Imperial Japanese Navy. Commissioned in July 1944, she operated as a kaiten manned suicide attack torpedo carrier during the final year of World War II. Surrendered at the end of the war, she was scuttled by the United States Navy in 1946. It is sometimes considered as part of a sub-class the Type C due to the various designs variations of the latter batch.

== Design and description ==
The Type C submarines were derived from the earlier Kaidai-type VI with a heavier torpedo armament for long-range attacks. They displaced 2,595 tonnes (2,554 long tons) surfaced and 3,618 tonnes (3,561 long tons) submerged. The submarines were 109.3 meters (358 ft 7 in) long, had a beam of 9.1 meters (29 ft 10 in) and a draft of 5.3 meters (17 ft 5 in). They had a diving depth of 100 meters (330 ft).

For surface running, the boats were powered by two 6,200-brake-horsepower (4,623 kW) diesel engines, each driving one propeller shaft. When submerged each propeller was driven by a 1,000-horsepower (746 kW) electric motor. They could reach 23.6 knots (43.7 km/h; 27.2 mph) on the surface and 8 knots (15 km/h; 9.2 mph) underwater. On the surface, the C1s had a range of 14,000 nautical miles (26,000 km; 16,000 mi) at 16 knots (30 km/h; 18 mph); submerged, they had a range of 60 nmi (110 km; 69 mi) at 3 knots (5.6 km/h; 3.5 mph).

The boats were armed with eight internal bow 53.3 cm (21.0 in) torpedo tubes and carried a total of 20 torpedoes. They were also armed with a single 140 mm (5.5 in)/40 deck gun and two single or twin mounts for 25 mm (1 in) Type 96 anti-aircraft guns. They were equipped to carry one Type A midget submarine aft of the conning tower.

== Construction and commissioning ==
Ordered under the Rapid Naval Armaments Supplement Programme and built by the Sasebo Naval Arsenal at Sasebo, Japan, I-47 was laid down on 21 November 1942 with the name Submarine No. 377. She was numbered I-47 and provisionally attached to the Yokosuka Naval District on 31 July 1943. Launched on 29 September 1943, she was completed and commissioned on 10 July 1944.

== Service history ==
Upon commissioning, I-47 was attached formally to the Yokosuka Naval District. From July through September 1944, she was assigned to Submarine Squadron 11 in the 6th Fleet for work-ups in the Iyo-nada. On 8 October 1944, she was reassigned to Submarine Division 15 in the 6th Fleet, and during October she was configured to carry four kaiten manned suicide attack torpedoes on her after deck, two of them with access tubes that allowed their pilots to enter them while she was submerged. She conducted kaiten launch exercises in Tokuyama Bay from 29 to 31 October 1944, and on 6 November 1944 embarked four kaitens at Otsujima Naval Base.

=== First kaiten mission ===
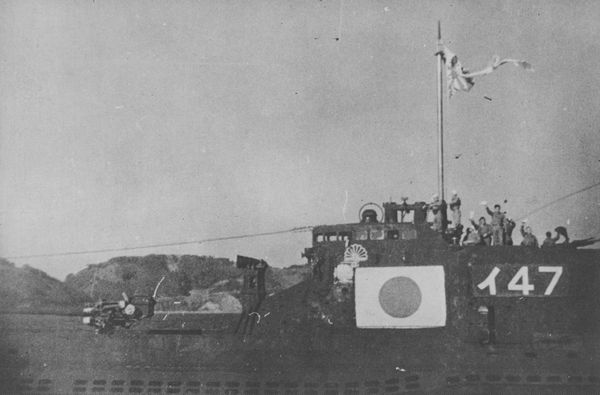
I-47 at Otsujima Naval Base on 8 November 1944.

On 7 November 1944, the commander-in-chief of the Combined Fleet, Admiral Soemu Toyoda, and the commander of the 6th Fleet, Vice Admiral Shigeyoshi Miwa, visited Otsujima to see off the kaiten pilots. On 8 November 1944, the Kikusui-tai Kaiten Group — made up of I-47 and the submarines I-36 and I-37 — got underway from Otsujima to conduct the first kaiten operation. Plans called for I-37 to target an American fleet anchorage at Palau with kaitens, while I-36 and I-47 were to carry out a kaiten attack on the U.S. anchorage at Ulithi Atoll in the Caroline Islands, then proceed to Leyte Gulf to attack Allied ships with conventional torpedoes. On 16 November 1944, the submarines received a report from a Nakajima C6N1 Saiun ("Iridescent Cloud"; Allied reporting name "Myrt") reconnaissance aircraft which made a high-altitude flight over Ulithi Atoll and sighted four fleet aircraft carriers and three battleships as well as cruisers and destroyers in the north central part of the lagoon and transports, oilers, and other ships in the south-central part.

By the evening of 18 November 1944, I-47 was 50 nautical miles (93 km; 58 mi) west of Ulithi, and she began her approach to the atoll from the southwest. She surfaced off Ulithi at dawn on 19 November and moved in at 12 knots (22 km/h; 14 mph) to only 4.5 nautical miles (8.3 km; 5.2 mi) off the atoll, observing over 200 ships in the anchorage. She surfaced again at 00:30 on 20 November 1944, and between 03:28 and 03:42 launched all four of her kaitens. At 05:47, one of them hit the U.S. Navy fleet oiler USS Mississinewa (AO-59), which caught fire, capsized, and sank at 09:28. I-47 then withdrew on the surface at 20 knots (37 km/h; 23 mph) to head for her patrol area in Leyte Gulf. After she transmitted a report of the sinking of Mississinewa on 22 November, however, she and I-36 received orders on 24 November to return to Japan rather than proceed to Leyte Gulf. After stopping at Otsujima, the two submarines arrived at Kure, Japan, on 30 November 1944.

On 2 December 1944, over 200 staff officers and specialists convened aboard the 6th Fleet flagship Tsukushi Maru to evaluate the results of the kaiten attack on Ulithi Atoll. After examining after-action reports and post-attack reconnaissance photographs, they credited the attack with sinking three aircraft carriers and two battleships. In fact, the attack had sunk only Mississinewa.

=== Second kaiten mission ===
On 8 December 1944, I-47 was assigned to the Kongo ("Steel") Kaiten Group along with the submarines I-36, I-48, I-53, I-56, and I-58 for an attack scheduled for dawn 11 January 1945 on five different U.S. anchorages in widely separated locations; the date of the attack later was postponed to 12 January 1945. She got underway on 25 December 1944 bound for her target, Hollandia on the coast of New Guinea. On 30 December 1944, during her voyage, she rescued eight starving Imperial Japanese Army soldiers from a raft in the Philippine Sea 290 nautical miles (540 km; 330 mi) west of Guam; the soldiers had participated in a failed attempt to storm the U.S. airfield on Guam and then escaped the island aboard the raft, drifting at sea for 32 days before I-47 found them.

On 8 January 1945, an Imperial Japanese Army Air Force reconnaissance aircraft flew over the Hollandia area and sighted 40 large transports anchored in Humboldt Bay (02°33′S 140°06′W) and 10 smaller vessels outside the anchorage, and the Japanese passed this report to I-47. I-47 sighted Cape Soeadja on the north coast of New Guinea at 10:30 on 11 January 1945, then proceeded north. After dark, she surfaced 30 nautical miles (56 km; 35 mi) off New Guinea to recharge her batteries. She sighted a U.S. hospital ship, which passed without noticing I-47, then headed south at 23:30 to reach her launch position off Humboldt Bay.

Submerged, I-47 reached the launch area 18 nautical miles (33 km; 21 mi) north of Cape Soeadja by 03:00 on 12 January 1945. She launched all four kaitens between 04:14 and 04:30, then surfaced and departed the area at flank speed. In Humboldt Bay, one kaiten grazed the port side of the anchored Liberty ship Pontus H. Ross 13 feet (4 m) below the waterline, causing a small leak in her No. 3 hold. The kaiten then exploded about 100 yards (91 m) off Pontus H. Ross′s port bow at 05:21, causing additional minor damage to her hull. A few seconds later another explosion took place off Cape Soeadja. At sea, I-47 noted a column of red fire rising from the direction of Humboldt Bay after 05:20. She reached Kure on 1 February 1945. During a conference aboard Tsukushi Maru on 7 February 1945, the 6th Fleet's staff credited I-47′s kaitens with sinking four transports at Humboldt Bay.

=== February–March 1945 ===
During I-47′s stay at Kure, her 140-millimeter (5.5 in) deck gun was removed and she was equipped to accommodate two more kaitens in its place, raising her kaiten-carrying capability to six. She suffered an accident on 16 March 1945 in which a member of her crew died of carbon monoxide poisoning while she was carrying out kaiten launch exercises in the Seto Inland Sea off Hikari. On 20 March 1945 she conducted combat exercises in the Seto Inland Sea with the submarines I-36, I-44, I-53, I-56, and I-58.

On 27 March 1945, I-47 was selected to lead the Tatara Kaiten Group in an attack on American ships off Okinawa. After loading provisions for two months and 20 torpedoes at Kure, she departed on the morning of 28 March 1945 and moved to Hikari, where she embarked six kaitens. She conducted diving tests with the six kaitens aboard on 29 March 1945, then returned to Hikari and embarked the kaiten pilots.

=== Third kaiten mission ===
I-47 got underway from Hikari on the afternoon of 29 March 1945, heading through the Bungo Strait on the surface at 20 knots (37 km/h; 23 mph) under the escort of the submarine chaser CHA-200. About two hours after she rendezvoused with CHA-200, American carrier aircraft attacked the two ships in the Sea of Hyūga off Kyushu at around 16:00, forcing I-47 to crash-dive and sinking CHA-200. I-47 surfaced after dark, but two American aircraft illuminated the area with flares and attacked her with several depth charges. She survived the attack with only minor damage.

While I-47 was on the surface recharging her batteries south of Kyushu 20 nautical miles (37 km; 23 mi) east of Tanegashima at 02:30 on 30 March, she sighted two Allied patrol vessels directly ahead of her and crash-dived. A main ballast tank vent malfunctioned, and she assumed a 50-degree down angle, reaching a depth of 260 feet (79 m) before her crew could stop her descent. Her crew finally stabilized her at a depth of 200 feet (61 m). Allied vessels pursued her for the next 11 hours, during which one of her periscopes and one of her fuel tanks developed leaks and her internal temperature rose to 127 °F (53 °C).

After finally breaking contact, I-47 surfaced 7 nautical miles (13 km; 8.1 mi) south of Tanegashima and headed south, but two Allied patrol aircraft sighted her and attacked her, dropping 20 depth charges. I-47 submerged and escaped with only minor additional damage, but her crew found it impossible to stop the leak in her fuel tank. She entered Uchinoura Bay on the coast of Kyushu before daybreak on 31 March 1945 so that her crew could inspect her damage. Her crew found an unexploded depth charge on her bridge and damage to her outer hull above her ballast tanks and to her anti-sonar coating. After reporting the damage to 6th Fleet Headquarters she received orders to abandon her mission and return to Hikari, which she reached on 1 April 1945. After disembarking her kaitens there, she proceeded to Kure for repairs. Arriving there on 2 April, she was drydocked until 15 April 1945.

=== Fourth kaiten mission ===
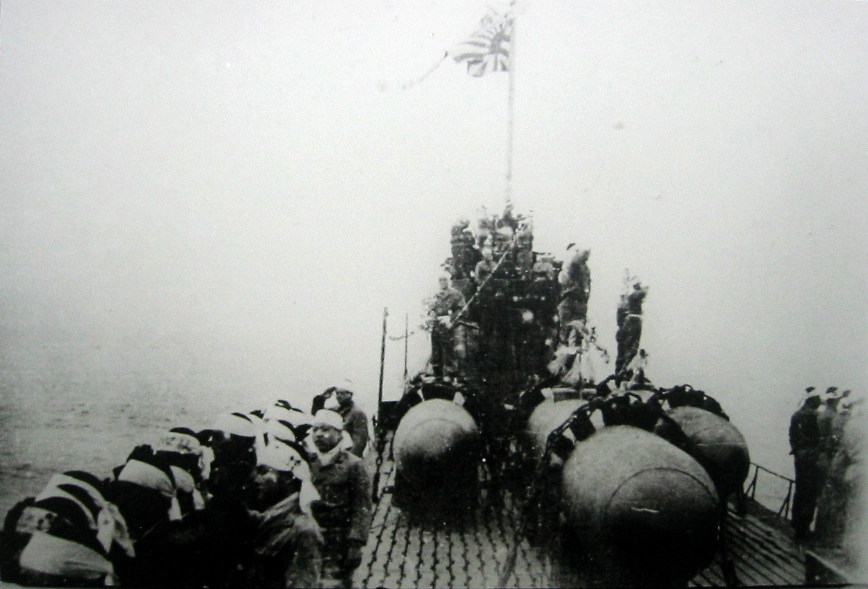
Kaitens aboard the I-47 while on patrol, 20 April 1945

With her repairs complete, I-47 departed Kure on 17 April 1945 bound for Hikari. There on 20 April 1945 she and I-36 formed the Tenmu ("Heavenly Warriors") Kaiten Group, each carrying six kaitens, with orders to attack Allied sea lines of communication between Okinawa, Ulithi Atoll, and the Mariana Islands. Bound for the waters east of Okinawa, I-47 got underway from Hirao on 22 April 1945. During her voyage, she was on the surface recharging her batteries on 23 April 1945 when her radar detector picked up a radar signal and she submerged. She avoided attack, but when she surfaced she sighted a sonobuoy apparently dropped by an American patrol plane that had been searching for her.

I-47 arrived in her patrol area 200 nautical miles (370 km; 230 mi) southeast of Okinawa on 26 April 1945. Her starboard diesel engine immediately broke down, and her crew began repairs. She received a radio message from I-36 on 27 April 1945 in which I-36 reported a successful kaiten attack on an Allied convoy. I-47′s crew completed repairs to her engine on 28 April 1945.

On 1 May 1945, I-47 was 100 nautical miles (190 km; 120 mi) south-southwest of Okidaitōjima when she detected an Allied convoy on radar at a range of 19 nautical miles (35 km; 22 mi). She closed the range and launched three kaitens at a range of 4,370 yards (4,000 m), subsequently hearing large explosions. On 2 May, she was 160 nautical miles (300 km; 180 mi) south-southwest of Okidaitōjima when she sighted a 10,000-ton tanker heading northwest at 10 to 12 knots (19 to 22 km/h; 12 to 14 mph) escorted by two destroyers. She launched a kaiten five minutes later, and subsequently heard two heavy explosions. Her sound operator then heard the propeller noises of two Fletcher-class destroyers, and at 11:20 I-47 launched another kaiten. I-47 temporarily lost sound contact with the kaiten, but then heard high-speed propellers, followed by a heavy explosion. I-47 then departed the area at flank speed, heading southeast.

On 7 May 1945, I-47 detected what she identified as a British Leander-class light cruiser south-southwest of Okidaitōjima on radar. She launched a kaiten and reported a hit on the cruiser. She could not launch her two remaining kaitens because of malfunctioning torpedoes, and the 6th Fleet ordered her to return to Hikari, which she reached on 12 May 1945. After disembarking her two kaitens and their pilots, she got back underway and arrived at Kure on 13 May 1945.

=== May–July 1945 ===
After arriving at Kure, I-47 underwent repairs that lasted until late June 1945. During this time, she probably had a snorkel installed. When her repairs were complete, she departed Kure on 30 June 1945 for work-ups in the Seto Inland Sea. She arrived at Hikari on 5 July 1945 and embarked kaitens with dummy warheads and their pilots to practice kaiten launches in the vicinity of Hikari. She returned to Kure on 13 July 1945 and refueled from other submarines located there. She moved from Kure to Hikari on 17 July and embarked six kaitens and their pilots, then conducted several test dives off Hikari on 18 July 1945.

=== Fifth kaiten mission ===
On 19 July 1945, I-47 became part of the Tamon Kaiten Group along with the submarines I-53, I-58, I-363, I-366, and I-367. She got underway that day, headed for a patrol area 300 nautical miles (560 km; 350 mi) east of Okinawa. She arrived in her patrol area on 23 July 1945. By 29 July she had made contact with three Allied ships but had launched no kaitens, and that day 6th Fleet Headquarters ordered her to proceed to a new patrol area northeast of the Philippine Islands.

On 30 July 1945, a typhoon struck the area. Unable to finish recharging her batteries, I-47 had to remain on the surface during the storm. Large waves swamped her several times before she finally could submerge. When she surfaced in heavy seas on 1 August 1945, one of her kaitens was washed overboard, and it collided with her after it went over the side. Her remaining kaitens developed leaks. She was recalled to Japan on 6 August and arrived at Hikari on 13 August 1945, where she disembarked the kaiten pilots and the five kaitens that remained aboard. She then proceeded to Kure, which she reached on 14 August 1945.

=== End of war ===
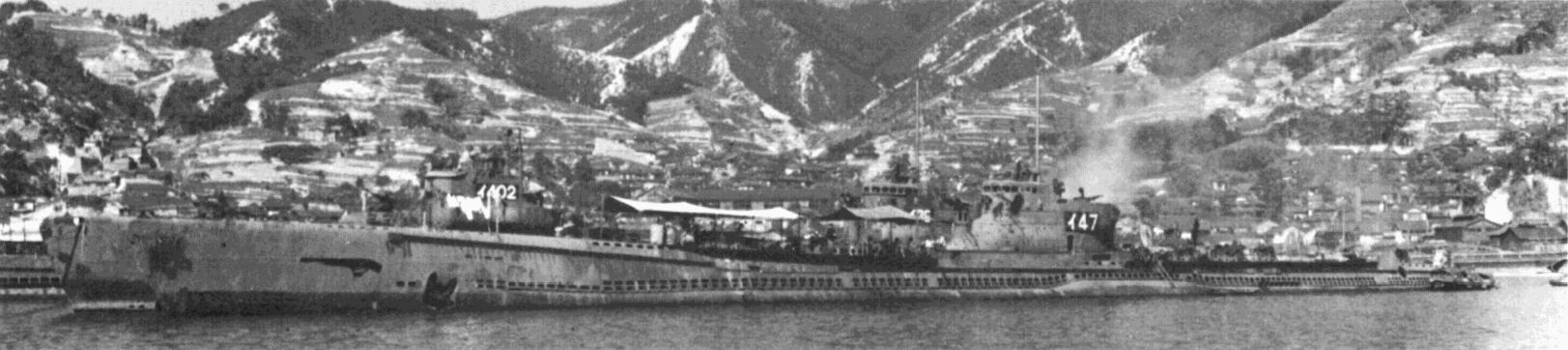
I-47 anchored off Kure after the war. I-36 is behind her

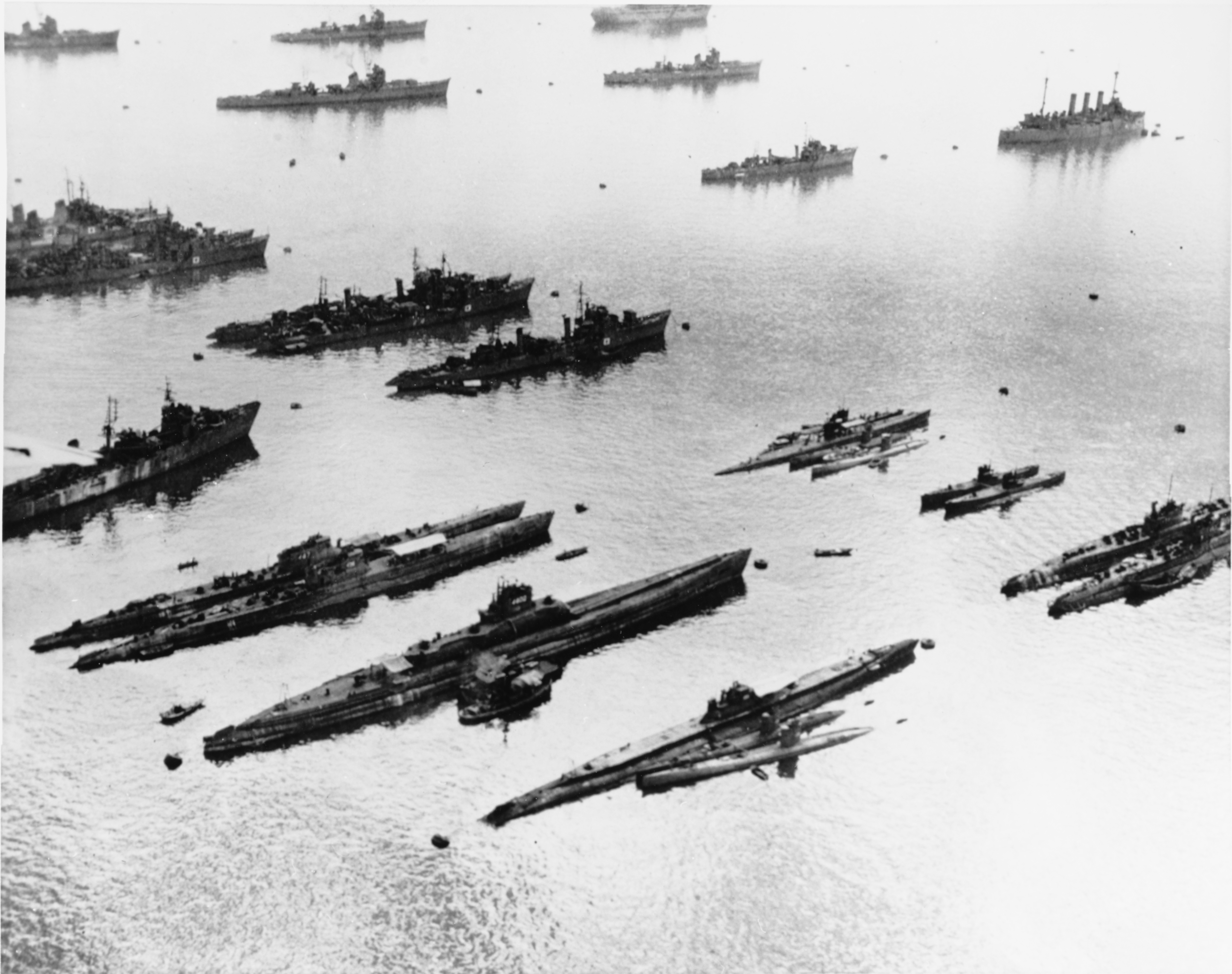
Japanese ships after the war. I-47 is the submarine furthest to the left in the first row, moored alongside I-36

On 15 August 1945, World War II ended with the Hirohito surrender broadcast announcing the cessation of hostilities between Japan and the Allies. Not willing to accept defeat, I-47′s crew decided to refuse to surrender and to try to reach Japanese-held Rabaul on New Britain in the Bismarck Archipelago, where they hoped to continue to fight. I-47 crewmen boarded a kaibokan escort vessel in the harbor at Kure and confiscated its food supply and several rifles and machine guns. They gave up on their plan when they could not find enough fuel for the voyage to Rabaul, and they abandoned I-47. I-47 surrendered to the Allies on 2 September 1945, the same day that Japan formally surrendered in a ceremony aboard the battleship USS Missouri (BB-63) in Tokyo Bay.

== Final disposition ==
The Japanese struck I-47 from the Navy list on 30 November 1945. In Operation Road's End, the U.S. Navy scuttled her off the Goto Islands on 1 April 1946.

Using a multibeam echosounder and a remotely operated vehicle, a research team of the Society La Plongée for Deep Sea Technology found and photographed the wreck of I-47 on 7 September 2017. The wreck lies at a depth of 230 feet (70 m).
