= Japanese submarine I-53 =

I-53 or Japanese submarine I-53 may refer to more than one submarine:

- Japanese submarine I-53 (1925), an Imperial Japanese Navy Type KD3 submarine launched in 1925 and decommissioned in 1945, renumbered I-153 in 1942
- Japanese submarine I-53 (1942), an Imperial Japanese Navy Type C submarine launched in 1942 and decommissioned in 1945
