= Japanese submarine I-44 =

1st class submarine of the Imperial Japanese Navy

- I-44 under outfitting off Yokosuka, 19 January 1944

History

Japan
- Name: Submarine No. 374
- Builder: Yokosuka Naval Arsenal, Yokosuka, Japan
- Laid down: 11 June 1942
- Renamed: I-44
- Launched: 5 March 1943
- Completed: 31 January 1944
- Commissioned: 31 January 1944
- Fate: Missing after 4 April 1945; Probably sunk 29 April 1945
- Stricken: 10 June 1945

General characteristics
- Class & type: Type B2 submarine
- Displacement: 2,624 tons surfaced; 3,700 tons submerged
- Length: 356.5 ft (108.7 m)
- Beam: 30.5 ft (9.3 m)
- Draft: 17 ft (5.2 m)
- Propulsion: 2 diesels: 11,000 hp (8,200 kW); Electric motors: 2,000 hp (1,500 kW)
- Speed: 23.5 knots (43.5 km/h) surfaced; 8 knots (15 km/h) submerged
- Range: 14,000 nautical miles (26,000 km) at 16 knots (30 km/h)
- Test depth: 100 m (330 ft)
- Complement: 114
- Armament: 6 × 533 mm (21 in) forward torpedo tubes; 17 torpedoes; 1 × 14 cm (5.5 in) deck gun (removed October 1944–February 1945); 6 × kaiten suicide attack torpedoes (added October 1944–February 1945)
- Aircraft carried: 1 x floatplane (removed October 1944–February 1945)
- Aviation facilities: Hangar and catapult (removed October 1944–February 1945)

I-44 was an Imperial Japanese Navy Type B2 submarine. Completed and commissioned in January 1944, she served in the late stages of World War II, she conducted war patrols in the Pacific Ocean as a conventional submarine before she was converted into a kaiten suicide attack torpedo carrier. She then conducted kaiten operations during the Battle of Iwo Jima and the Battle of Okinawa before she was sunk in April 1945.

== Construction and commissioning ==
I-44 was laid down on 11 June 1942 by the Yokosuka Naval Arsenal at Yokosuka, Japan, with the name Submarine No. 374. Eventually named I-44, she was launched on 5 March 1943. She was completed and commissioned on 31 January 1944.

== Service history ==
Upon commissioning, I-44 was assigned to Submarine Squadron 11 in the 6th Fleet. Once her workups were complete, she called at the Tokuyama Fuel Depot from 28 to 29 March 1944 to refuel.

=== First war patrol ===
On 31 March 1944, I-44 and the submarines I-183, Ro-47, Ro-116, and Ro-117 received orders to deploy in the Pacific Ocean east of Palau to intercept a Palau-bound United States Navy task force. She got underway from Agenosho Bay that day, but received a recall order on 5 April 1944. She arrived at Kure on 14 April 1944. After her arrival at Kure, I-44 became the first Japanese submarine fitted with the Type 13 air-search radar.

=== Operation Tatsumaki ===
I-44 was reassigned to Submarine Division 15 in Submarine Squadron 1 in the Advance Unit in the 6th Fleet on 28 April 1944. In May 1944, she and the submarines I-36, I-38, I-41 and I-53 and the auxiliary submarine tender Tsukushi Maru began training in the Seto Inland Sea off Nasakejima for Operation Tatsumaki ("Tornado"), which called for the submarines to transport modified Type 4 Ka-Tsu amphibious tracked landing craft, each armed with two 450-millimeter (17.7 in) torpedoes, from Kure to Majuro. After the submarines launched the Ka-Tsu vehicles, the operation called for the vehicles to proceed to shore, move overland across the atoll's islands, then enter the water in the lagoon and attack Allied ships with torpedoes. Operation Tatsumaki later was postponed pending the correction of defects found in the Ka-Tsu vehicles and eventually was canceled entirely.

=== Second war patrol ===
On 15 May 1944, I-44 departed Kure along with I-41 and I-53 to begin her second war patrol. The three submarines were assigned to picket duty off the Bismarck Archipelago, northeast of New Ireland and north of Kavieng. One source has suggested that the U.S. submarine USS Permit (SS-178) torpedoed and damaged I-44 on 26 May 1944, but Japanese sources do not confirm this. Instead, while I-44 was on the surface in the Pacific Ocean in the vicinity of 27°02′N 151°00′E on 27 May 1944 and operating her new air-search radar, an Allied plane surprised her and scored several near-misses; Japanese historians disagree on whether the radar set was defective or its inexperienced operator made mistakes while still learning to use it properly. She crash-dived, but several patrol vessels then attacked her, scoring several more near-misses. She rigged for silent running, and eventually broke contact with them. With her periscopes, her main switchboard, and many of her instruments damaged and a leak in her bow section, she surfaced after escaping the Allied vessels. She soon sighted a U.S. Navy PB4Y-2 Privateer patrol bomber flying nearby; unable to submerge again, she evaded the plane by escaping into a rain squall. She reached Kure on 5 June 1944 and underwent repairs there.

=== Third war patrol ===
The commander-in-chief of the Combined Fleet, Admiral Soemu Toyoda, activated Operation Shō-Gō 1 for the defense of the Philippine Islands on 13 October 1944. With her repairs complete, I-44 got underway from Kure on 19 October 1944 for her third war patrol, assigned a patrol area east of the Philippines and off Leyte as part of Submarine Group B, which also included the submarines I-38, Ro-41, and Ro-43. She was in the Bashi Channel in darkness on 20 October 1944 when an explosion in her automatic trim system pressure tank killed three members of her crew, wrecked her gyrocompass, and disabled one of her propeller shafts. Forced to return to Japan for repairs, she arrived at Kure on 22 October 1944.

=== Conversion to kaiten carrier ===
The last surviving Type B2 submarine, I-44 was selected for conversion to carry kaiten suicide attack torpedoes. While she was under repair, her 140-millimeter (5.5 in) deck gun was removed to make room on her afterdeck for fittings to allow her to carry four kaitens abaft her conning tower and her aircraft hangar and catapult were removed from her foredeck to make room forward of her conning tower for the fittings for two more kaitens. In addition, a Type 22 surface-search radar also was installed aboard her.

The Japanese originally intended to assign I-44 to take part in the first operational use of kaitens, but cancelled her participation in the mission in early November 1944. In early February 1945, she received orders to proceed to the kaiten base at Otsujima along with the submarines I-368 and I-370 to begin kaiten-handling training.

=== First kaiten mission ===
On 19 February 1945, the Battle of Iwo Jima began with the U.S. landings on Iwo Jima. That day, I-44, I-368, and I-370 were assigned to the Chihaya Kaiten Group, with orders to attack Allied ships off the island. I-44 was the last of the three submarines to get underway, departing Otsujima at 09:00 on 22 February 1945 for her fourth war patrol and first kaiten mission. She was on the surface recharging her batteries 48 nautical miles (89 km; 55 mi) southwest of Iwo Jima on 25 February 1945 when two or three Allied warships — which her lookouts identified as destroyers or submarine chasers — sighted her and forced her to dive. She remained submerged for 47 hours, during which the carbon dioxide levels inside her reached 6 percent, before she could break contact and surface safely.

I-44 reached her patrol area south of Iwo Jima late on 26 February 1945. On 28 February, she attempted an approach to Iwo Jima on the surface from east of the island, but a TBF Avenger aircraft attacked her and forced her to submerge and retire. Later that day, her commanding officer reported the incident and I-44′s withdrawal, but his message did not reach the commander-in-chief of the 6th Fleet, Vice Admiral Shigeyoshi Miwa. On 1 March 1945, she reported her commanding officer's intention to move to the Okidaitōjima area in the Daitō Islands southeast of Okinawa, but after 6th Fleet headquarters asked her on 2 March 1945 to report her location and any success she had had against Allied ships, her reply on 3 March 1945 was a routine situation report which failed to provide the details the 6th Fleet had requested.

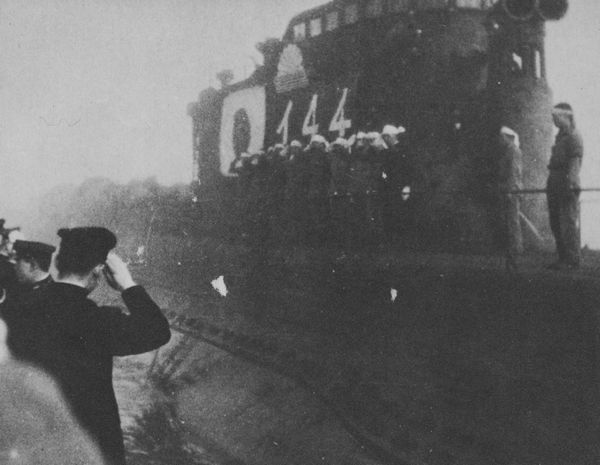
I-44 sorting on a kaiten mission from the naval base at Otsujima, Japan, 3 April 1945

On 6 March 1945, the 6th Fleet cancelled all submarine operations in the Iwo Jima area, and I-44 headed for Japan. She disembarked her kaitens and their pilots at Otsujima on 9 March and on 11 March she arrived at Kure, where Miwa relieved her commanding officer of command.

=== Second kaiten mission ===
Between 26 and 29 March 1945, U.S. forces landed in the Kerama Islands southwest of Okinawa and captured advance bases in preparation for an invasion of Okinawa itself. On 27 March 1945, the Tatara Kaiten Group — which included I-44 and the submarines I-47, I-56, and I-58, each carrying six kaitens — was formed to attack Allied ships off Okinawa. On 1 April 1945, the Battle of Okinawa began with U.S. landings on the island, and on 3 April I-44 received orders to get underway for Okinawan waters as part of the Tatara Group. She departed Otsujima on 4 April 1945 for her fifth war patrol and second kaiten mission, carrying the same four kaiten pilots as she had on the Chihaya Group deployment. On 21 April 1945, 6th Fleet headquarters ordered her to return to Japan, but she did not reply.

=== Loss ===
I-44 was lost sometime in April 1945, and the circumstances of her loss remain unknown. Some Japanese historians have concluded that a hunter-killer group made up of the light aircraft carrier USS Bataan (CVL-29) and several destroyers sank I-44 on 18 April 1945, but it is more likely that the submarine sunk in the action was I-56.

On 29 April 1945, a TBM Avenger of U.S. Navy Composite Squadron 92 (VC-92) took off from the escort aircraft carrier USS Tulagi (CVE-72) 220 nautical miles (410 km; 250 mi) southeast of Okinawa at 14:18. During the flight, the Avenger's crew sighted a Japanese submarine on the surface and dived on it from an altitude of 4,000 feet (1,200 m). As the submarine crash-dived, the plane dropped a depth charge that exploded adjacent to the submarine's conning tower. On its next pass, the Avenger dropped a Mark 24 "Fido" acoustic homing torpedo which exploded against the submarine's hull, sinking it at 24°15′N 131°16′E. The submarine probably was I-44.

On 2 May 1945, the Imperial Japanese Navy declared I-44 to be presumed lost in the Okinawa area with the loss of all 134 men aboard — 130 crewmen and four embarked kaiten pilots. She was stricken from the Navy list on 10 June 1945.

== Sources ==
- Hackett, Bob & Kingsepp, Sander. IJN Submarine I-44: Tabular Record of Movement. Retrieved on September 16, 2020.
