= Japanese submarine I-53 (1942) =

Type C cruiser submarine

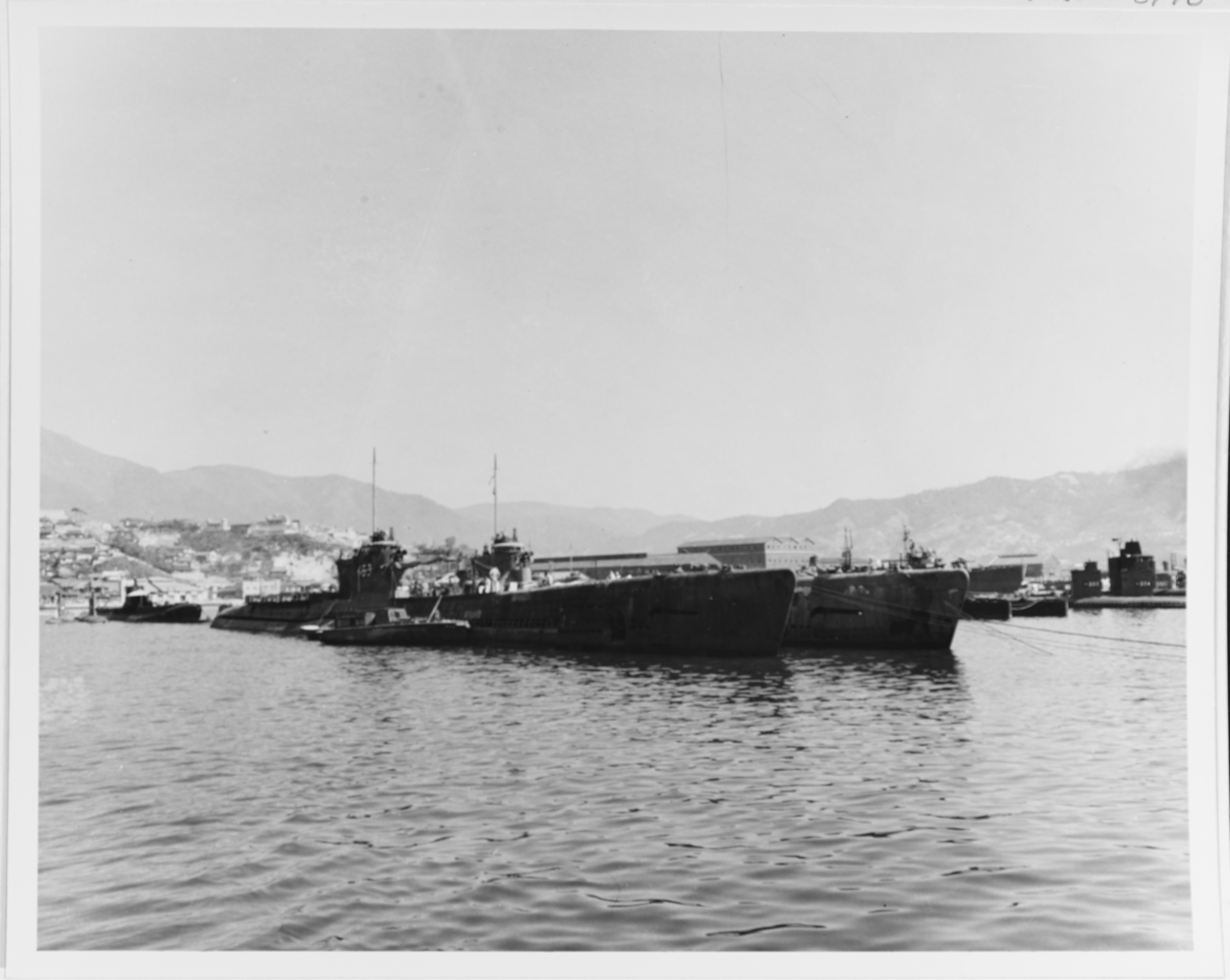
- I-53 anchored at Kure, 16 October 1945. The submarine I-58 is moored besides her.

History

Empire of Japan
- Name: Submarine No. 626
- Builder: Kure Navy Yard, Kure, Hiroshima
- Laid down: 15 May 1942
- Renamed: I-53 on 1 November 1942
- Launched: 24 December 1942
- Completed: 20 February 1944
- Commissioned: 20 February 1944
- Fate: Surrendered 1945; Stricken 30 November 1945; Scuttled 1 April 1946

General characteristics
- Class & type: Type C2 submarine
- Displacement: 2,605 tonnes (2,564 long tons) surfaced; 3,702 tonnes (3,644 long tons) submerged
- Length: 108.7 m (356 ft 8 in) overall
- Beam: 9.3 m (30 ft 6 in)
- Draft: 5.1 m (16 ft 9 in)
- Installed power: 4,700 bhp (3,500 kW) (diesel); 1,200 hp (890 kW) (electric motor)
- Propulsion: Diesel-electric; 1 × diesel engine; 1 × electric motor
- Speed: 17.7 knots (32.8 km/h; 20.4 mph) surfaced; 6.5 knots (12.0 km/h; 7.5 mph) submerged
- Range: 27,000 nmi (50,000 km; 31,000 mi) at 12 knots (22 km/h; 14 mph) surfaced; 105 nmi (194 km; 121 mi) at 3 knots (5.6 km/h; 3.5 mph) submerged
- Test depth: 100 m (330 ft)
- Crew: 94
- Armament: 6 × bow 533 mm (21 in) torpedo tubes; 2 × 14 cm (5.5 in) deck gun; 1 × twin 25 mm (1 in) Type 96 anti-aircraft guns

The second I-53 was the second of three Type C cruiser submarines of the C2 sub-class built for the Imperial Japanese Navy. Commissioned in February 1944, she operated primarily as a kaiten manned suicide attack torpedo carrier during the final year of World War II and sank the destroyer escort USS Underhill (DE-682). Surrendered at the end of the war, she was scuttled by the United States Navy in 1946.

== Design and description ==
The Type C2 submarines were derived from the earlier C1 sub-class although with fewer torpedo tubes, an additional deck gun, and less-powerful engines to extend their range. They displaced 2,605 tonnes (2,564 long tons) surfaced and 3,702 tonnes (3,644 long tons) submerged. The submarines were 108.7 meters (356 ft 8 in) long, had a beam of 9.3 meters (30 ft 6 in) and a draft of 5.1 meters (16 ft 9 in). They had a diving depth of 100 meters (330 ft).

For surface running, the boats were powered by two 2,350-brake-horsepower (1,752 kW) diesel engines, each driving one propeller shaft. When submerged each propeller was driven by a 600-horsepower (447 kW) electric motor. They could reach 17.7 knots (32.8 km/h; 20.4 mph) on the surface and 6.5 knots (12.0 km/h; 7.5 mph) underwater. On the surface, the C2s had a range of 27,000 nautical miles (50,000 km; 31,000 mi) at 12 knots (22 km/h; 14 mph); submerged, they had a range of 105 nmi (194 km; 121 mi) at 3 knots (5.6 km/h; 3.5 mph).

The boats were armed with six internal bow 53.3 cm (21.0 in) torpedo tubes and carried a total of 19 torpedoes. They were also armed with two 140 mm (5.5 in)/40 deck guns and one twin mount for 25 mm (1 in) Type 96 anti-aircraft guns.

== Construction and commissioning ==
Ordered under the Rapid Naval Armaments Supplement Programme and built by the Kure Navy Yard at Kure, Japan, I-53 was laid down on 15 May 1942 with the name Submarine No. 626. She was numbered I-53 and provisionally attached to the Kure Naval District on 1 November 1942; she was the second Japanese submarine of that number, the first I-53 having been renumbered I-153 on 20 May 1942. Launched on 24 December 1942, she was completed and commissioned on 20 February 1944.

== Service history ==
=== Operation Tatsumaki ===
Upon commissioning, I-53 was attached formally to the Kure Naval District. She was assigned to Submarine Squadron 11 in the 6th Fleet for work-ups. After refueling at the 3rd Fuel Depot, she departed Tokuyama on 29 March 1944 to resume work-ups in the Seto Inland Sea. In April 1944, she joined the submarines I-36, I-38, I-41, and I-44 in training in the Seto Inland Sea for Operation Tatsumaki ("Tornado"), in which the submarines were to transport modified Type 4 Ka-Tsu amphibious tracked landing craft, each armed with two 450-millimeter (17.7 in) torpedoes, from Kure to Majuro in the Marshall Islands. After the submarines launched the Ka-Tsu vehicles, the operation called for the vehicles to proceed to shore, move overland across the atoll′s islands, then enter the water in the lagoon and attack Allied ships with torpedoes. The operation was cancelled before any of the submarines could take part in it.

=== First war patrol ===
On 17 May 1944, I-53 departed Saeki, Japan, to begin her first war patrol, assigned a patrol area northeast of Kavieng on New Britain in the Bismarck Archipelago. While she was on the way to her patrol area, she was reassigned to Submarine Division 15 in the 6th Fleet on 19 May 1944. After that, her patrol passed uneventfully until 28 June 1944, when her crew discovered a serious diesel fuel leak in one of her fuel tanks. She departed her patrol area and called at Truk from 2 to 15 July 1944 to undergo temporary repairs, then embarked the commander of Submarine Squadron 7 and proceeded to Kure, which she reached on 25 July 1944.

=== July–October 1944 ===
I-53 arrived at Sasebo on 28 July 1944 and entered drydock there for repairs and an overhaul, during which shipyard workers renewed her anti-radar coating and anti-sonar coating. In late August 1944, she was selected for conversion to carry kaiten manned suicide attack torpedoes. As part of the conversion, the 140-millimeter (5.5 in) deck gun abaft her conning tower was removed to make way for fittings for four kaitens on her after deck.

On 13 October 1944, the Combined Fleet ordered the activation of Operation Shō-Gō 1, the defense of the Philippine Islands, in anticipation of an American invasion of the islands, Although her kaiten conversion was incomplete, I-53 was ordered to participate in Shō-Gō 1 as a conventional submarine, and on 13 October she received orders to join the submarines I-26, I-45, I-54, and I-56 in forming Group "A" under the direct command of the 6th Fleet.

=== Second war patrol ===
I-53 departed Kure to begin her second war patrol on 19 October 1944, assigned a patrol area off the Philippines. On 20 October 1944, U.S. amphibious landings on Leyte began the Battle of Leyte. I-53 received orders on 21 October to proceed to waters in the Philippine Sea east of Leyte. Although the reaction of Japanese naval forces to the American invasion led to the Battle of Leyte Gulf, fought from 23 to 26 October 1944, I-53 saw no action during the battle, and her patrol was uneventful until 4 November 1944. On that date, she surfaced in the Philippine Sea 650 nautical miles (1,200 km; 750 mi) east of Manila at around 01:00 and drew the attention of a United States Navy destroyer — probably USS Boyd (DD-544), later joined by the destroyer USS Brown (DD-546) — which pursued her for 38 hours. With her crew issued special vials containing chemical compounds to minimize the carbon dioxide content in her interior, I-53 had to descend to a depth of 490 feet (149 m) before she finally managed to break contact. She returned to Kure on 22 November 1944.

=== First kaiten mission ===
While I-53 was at Kure, shipyard workers completed her conversion to carry kaitens. On 8 December 1944, she was assigned to the Kongo ("Steel") Kaiten Group along with the submarines I-36, I-47, I-48, I-56, and I-58 for an attack scheduled for dawn on 11 January 1945 on five different U.S. anchorages in widely separated locations; the date of the attack later was postponed to 12 January 1945. On 19 December 1944 she took part in exercises with the other submarines of the Kongo group. I-53 and I-58 arrived at Otsujima on 28 December 1944, where they embarked their kaitens and the kaiten pilots.

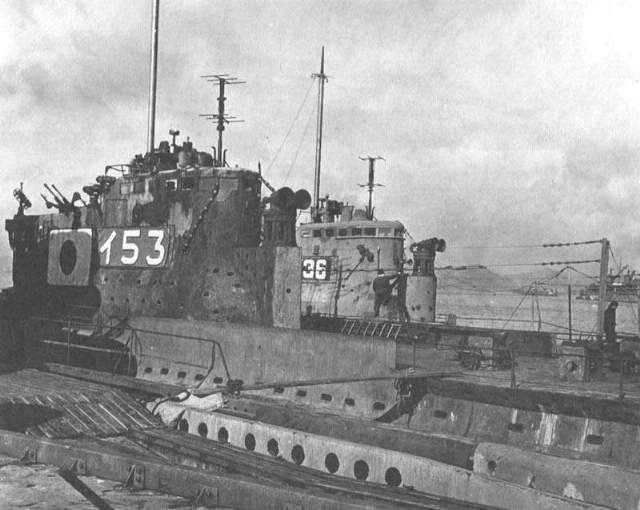
I-53 and I-36 moored in Kure after their first Kaiten mission, January 1945

At 10:00 on 30 December 1944, I-53 got underway in company with I-36 and I-58 bound for their target, the U.S. fleet anchorage at Kossol Roads in the Palau Islands. She surfaced 4 nautical miles (7.4 km; 4.6 mi) off Kossol Roads at 07:00 on 12 January 1945 and launched her kaitens. One exploded soon after launch, and another never started its engine. The other two launched without incident. I-53 submerged to await developments and heard two explosions from the direction of Kossol Roads about 80 minutes after launching her kaitens. Japanese observers on a nearby island reported that two kaitens had scored hits on Allied ships in the anchorage and I-53 was credited with sinking two transports, although postwar analysis could confirm no sinkings. I-53 then surfaced to inspect the kaiten which had not started its engine and discovered that its pilot had been rendered unconscious by fumes from its fuel. I-53 returned to Kure on 26 January 1945 for repairs and an overhaul.

=== Second kaiten mission ===
On 27 March 1945, I-53 was assigned to the Tatara Kaiten Group along with I-44, I-47, I-56, and I-58 for an attack on American ships off Okinawa, with I-47 serving as the group's flagship. She got underway from Kure on the afternoon of 30 March 1945 bound for Hikari, where she was to embark four kaitens and their pilots. While conducting a trim test en route, however, she grazed a magnetic mine laid by a United States Army Air Forces B-29 Superfortress off Iwai Island on the northern side of the eastern entrance to Suō-nada in the Seto Inland Sea. The mine exploded, knocking out her diesel engines, destroying a number of her batteries, and causing a leak in a fuel tank on her starboard side. The damage forced her to return to Kure on one shaft, using her auxiliary engine.

=== April–July 1945 ===
I-53 departing Otsujima for her third Kaiten mission, during which she sank the USS Underhill, 14 July 1945.

After arriving at Kure on 1 April 1945, I-53 entered drydock for repairs. In addition, her forward 140-millimeter (5.5 in) deck gun was removed to make room for fittings on her forward deck allowing her to carry two more kaitens, giving her a maximum kaiten-carrying capability of six. Shipyard workers also equipped her with a snorkel and fitted underwater access tubes for all six of her kaitens so that their pilots could man them while she was submerged. With the work complete, she departed Kure on 9 July 1945 bound for Otsujima and carried out combat exercises during her voyage. She arrived at Otsujima on 13 July 1945.

=== Third kaiten mission ===
On 14 July 1945, I-53 was assigned to the Tamon Kaiten Group along with the submarines I-47, I-58, I-363, I-366, and I-367. She embarked six kaitens and their pilots that morning and in the afternoon got underway for her operating area in waters about 300 nautical miles (560 km; 350 mi) southeast of the southern tip of Formosa, which she reached on 22 July 1945.

I-53 was operating submerged in the Philippine Sea 260 nautical miles (480 km; 300 mi) northeast of Cape Engaño Lighthouse on 24 July 1945 when she sighted a U.S. Navy convoy consisting of the stores ship USS Adria (AF-30) and six tank landing ships, carrying the United States Army′s 96th Infantry Division, which was being withdrawn from the Battle of Okinawa. Making 10 knots (19 km/h; 12 mph), the convoy was proceeding toward the Philippines escorted by the destroyer escort USS Underhill (DE-682), the patrol craft escort USS PCE-872, and the submarine chasers USS PC-803, USS PC-804, USS PC-807, USS PC-1251, USS SC-1306, and USS SC-1309. At about 12:00, Underhill picked up a sonar contact on I-53 and ordered PC-804 to conduct a depth-charge attack. Underhill then maneuvered to ram I-53, but I-53 dived and launched a kaiten at 14:25. Underhill dropped a pattern of 13 depth charges at 14:53. Meanwhile, the kaiten passed beneath PC-804. After it surfaced alongside Underhill, Underhill rammed the port side of the kaiten at 15:07 and it exploded, obliterating Underhill′s forward section as far back as her stack and killing 113 members of her crew. Underhill′s stern section remained afloat, but PCE-872, PC-803, and PC-804 sank it with gunfire at 19°24′N 126°43′E. I-53′s commanding officer reported sinking a large transport.

At around 1300 on 27 July 1945, I-53 was submerged east of the Bashi Channel when she sighted a southbound American convoy of ten ships. I-53 began an approach, but as the convoy moved out of torpedo range her commanding officer considered letting it go. However, one of the embarked kaiiten pilots begged for the chance to attempt a long-range suicide attack, and I-53 launched his kaiten at around 17:00. She heard a heavy explosion around 18:00 and departed, heading for her earlier patrol area.

On 7 August 1945, I-53 sighted a convoy of American tank landing ships bound from Okinawa to Leyte in the Philippine Sea at 20°17′N 128°07′E. She began a submerged approach. The destroyer escort USS Earl V. Johnson (DE-702) detected her on sonar at 00:23 and dropped a pattern of 14 depth charges, then lost contact. After 25 minutes, Earl V. Johnson regained contact, and she conducted a second depth-charge attack at 00:55 and a third at 02:12. Although none of the attacks achieved a hit on I-53, she was rocked by explosions that knocked out some of her batteries and all of her internal lighting and disabled her rudder engine. At 02:30, she launched a kaiten from a depth of 130 feet (40 m).

Meanwhile, the patrol craft escort USS PCE-849 joined Earl V. Johnson in attacking I-53 and fired a Hedgehog salvo at 02:33, scoring no hits. At 02:35, Earl V. Johnson sighted a passing torpedo at 02:35, then two more at 02:45, one of which passed beneath Earl V. Johnson before exploding at 02:46. At about 02:50, the crew of I-53 heard an explosion. PCE-849 conducted another unsuccessful Hedgehog attack at 02:56, and Earl V. Johnson regained sonar contact on I-53 soon afterward. I-53 launched another kaiten at 03:00, but her remaining two kaitens developed mechanical problems that prevented her from launching them. At 03:26, Earl V. Johnson conducted a depth-charge attack against a new target, suffering slight damage from the detonation of her own depth charges, and her crew heard a heavy explosion at 03:30 and sighted a plume of white smoke. Earl V. Johnson then broke off the action to return to the convoy. I-53′s crew heard a heavy explosion at 03:32.

Earl V. Johnson claimed one submarine sunk in the action. In fact, I-53 had survived, and that evening the 6th Fleet ordered her to return to Japan. She reached Otsujima on 12 August 1945 and disembarked her two remaining kaitens, then got underway for Kure, where she arrived on 13 August 1945.

=== End of war ===
I-53's conning tower during the day of her disposal, 1 April 1946

On 15 August 1945, World War II ended with the Hirohito surrender broadcast announcing the cessation of hostilities between Japan and the Allies. Japan formally surrendered in a ceremony aboard the battleship USS Missouri (BB-63) in Tokyo Bay on 2 September 1945.

I-53 underwent an inspection at Kure on 5 October 1945, when it was recorded that she was manned by a reduced crew of 50 under the command of her navigation officer and had 15 tons of fuel, 7.2 tons of rice, 20 tons of fresh water, and no weapons on board. In November 1945 she was moved to Ebisu Bay near Sasebo, and her crew was reduced further .

== Final disposition ==
The Japanese struck I-53 from the Navy list on 30 November 1945. After she was stripped of all useful equipment and valuable materials, the U.S. Navy submarine tender USS Nereus (AS-17) towed her from Sasebo to an area off the Goto Islands and scuttled her with gunfire at 32°37′N 129°17′E on 1 April 1946 as part of Operation Road's End.

Using a multibeam echosounder and a remotely operated vehicle, a research team of the Society La Plongée for Deep Sea Technology found and photographed the wreck of I-53 on 7 September 2017.
