= Japanese submarine I-36 =

Type B1 submarine

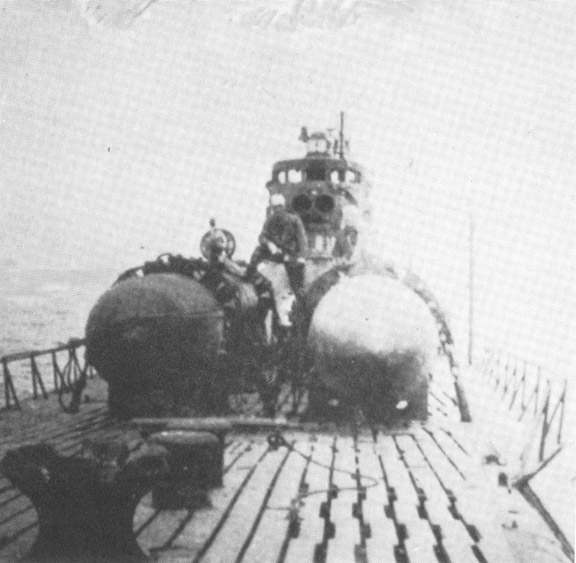
- Kaiten suicide torpedoes loaded aboard I-36's deck, April 1945

History

Japan
- Name: Submarine No. 149
- Builder: Yokosuka Navy Yard, Yokosuka, Japan
- Laid down: 4 December 1940
- Launched: 1 November 1941
- Renamed: I-36 on 1 November 1941
- Completed: 30 September 1942
- Commissioned: 30 September 1942
- Fate: Surrendered September 1945; Stricken 30 November 1945; Scuttled 1 April 1946

General characteristics
- Class & type: Type B1 submarine
- Displacement: 2,584 tons surfaced; 3,654 tons submerged
- Length: 108.7 m (357 ft)
- Beam: 9.3 m (31 ft)
- Draft: 5.14 m (16.9 ft)
- Propulsion: 2 diesels: 12,400 hp (9,200 kW); Electric motors: 2,000 hp (1,500 kW)
- Speed: 23.5 knots (43.5 km/h) surfaced; 8 knots (15 km/h) submerged
- Range: 14,000 nautical miles (26,000 km) at 16 knots (30 km/h)
- Test depth: 100 m (330 ft)
- Complement: 94
- Armament: 6 × 533 mm (21 in) forward torpedo tubes; 17 torpedoes; 1 × 14 cm/40 11th Year Type naval gun
- Aircraft carried: 1 Yokosuka E14Y seaplane

I-36 was an Imperial Japanese Navy B1 type submarine. Completed and commissioned in 1942, she served in World War II, operating in the Guadalcanal campaign, New Guinea campaign, Aleutian Islands campaign, and the Marshall Islands. She finished the war as a kaiten manned suicide attack torpedo carrier, operating against Allied ships at Ulithi Atoll and in the Philippine Sea. The only submarine of her class to survive the war, she surrendered to the Allies in September 1945 after the end of the war and was scuttled by the United States Navy in 1946.

== Construction and commissioning ==
I-36 was laid down on 4 December 1940 at the Yokosuka Navy Yard at Yokosuka, Japan, with the name Submarine No. 149. She was both renamed I-36 and launched on 1 November 1941. She finished her acceptance trials on 20 September 1942, and was completed and commissioned on 30 September 1942.

== Service history ==
Upon commissioning, I-36 was attached to the Kure Naval District and assigned to the Kure Submarine Squadron. She moved to Agenosho Bay for work-up in the Iyo-nada in the Seto Inland Sea. With her work-up completed, she arrived at Kure on 30 November 1942.

On 15 December 1942, I-36 was reassigned to Submarine Division 15 in Submarine Squadron 1 in the 6th Fleet. She departed Kure at 13:00 on 18 December 1942 and proceeded to Truk, which she reached on 28 December 1942.

=== Guadalcanal campaign ===
Assigned to take part in submarine cargo runs to supply Japanese forces on Guadalcanal fighting in the Guadalcanal campaign, I-36 got back underway from Truk on the same day she arrived. She proceeded to the Japanese anchorage in the Shortland Islands off Shortland Island, arriving there on 31 December 1942. After the submarine I-31 arrived at Shortland after a supply run to Kamimbo Bay on the northwestern coast of Guadalcanal, I-36′s commanding officer and navigation officer went aboard I-31 on 1 January 1943 to receive a briefing on the naval situation in the Kamimbo Bay area and the cargo unloading procedures there. During the afternoon, I-36 loaded a cargo of 20 tons of rice in supply drums, then conducted a test dive off Shortland Island. She got underway for Guadalcanal at 18:00. A half an hour after dark on 3 January 1943, she surfaced at Kamimbo Bay, discharged her cargo into four Daihatsu-class landing craft, and headed back for Shortland Island, where she arrived at 07:39 on 5 January 1943.

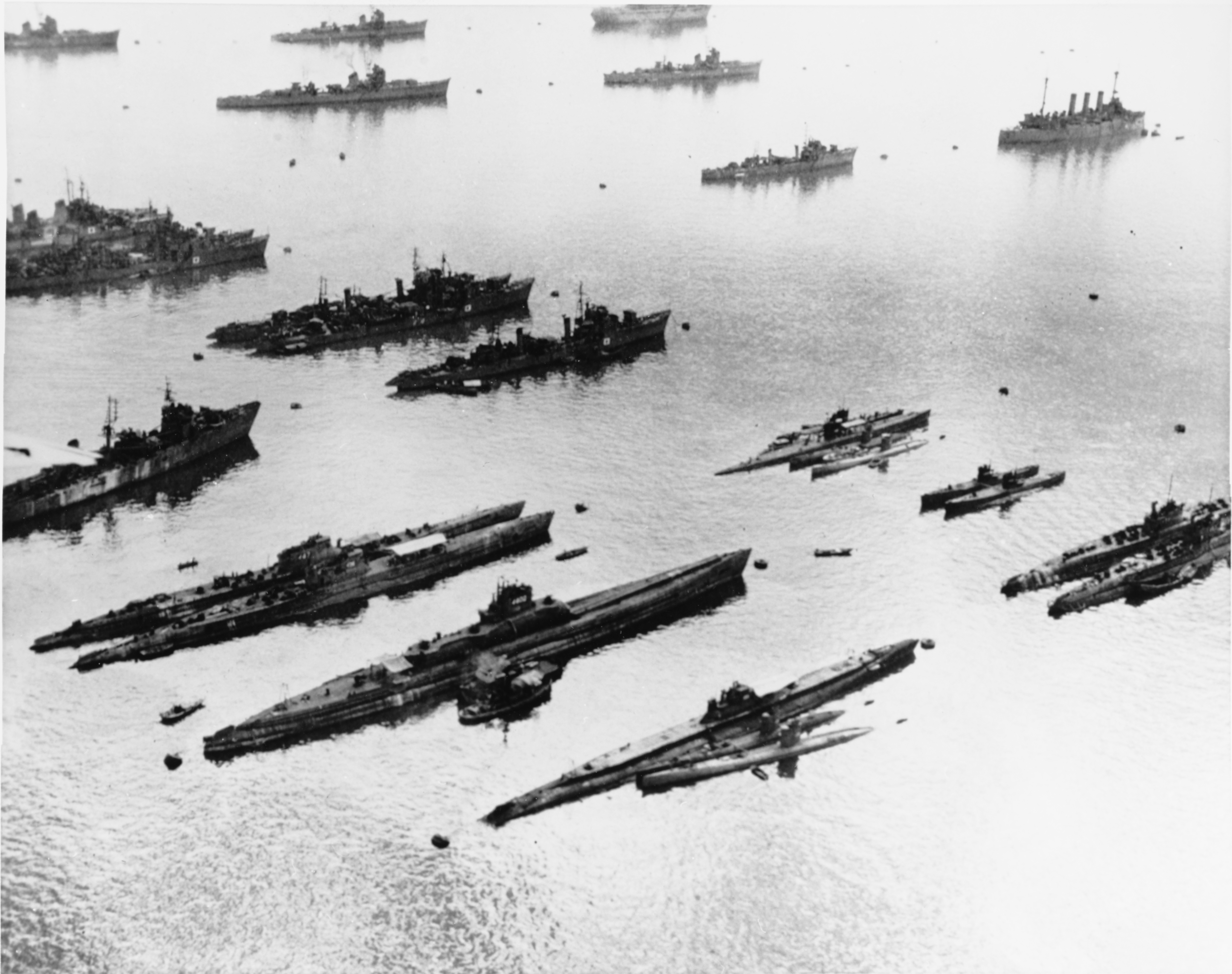
I-36 (2nd to furthest submarine in front row) anchored alongside several Japanese ships, 10 December 1945.

On 6 January 1943, I-36 departed Shortland for her second supply run at 18:00. Arriving at Kamimbo Bay after dark on 8 January, she unloaded her cargo — 12 rubber containers of food — into Daihatsus, embarked 39 Imperial Japanese Army soldiers, and got back underway, returning to the Shortland anchorage at 06:30 on 10 January 1943. She left the same day at 18:00 bound for Rabaul on New Britain.

=== New Guinea campaign, January–February 1943 ===
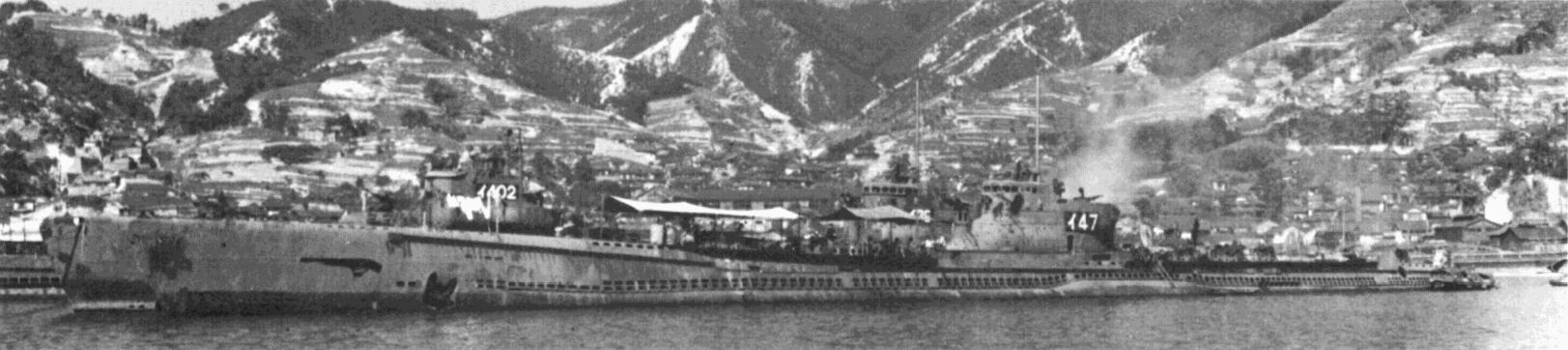
I-36 anchored off Kure behind I-47 after the end of WW2

I-36 arrived at Rabaul on 11 January 1943 at 11:21, and that day the commander of Submarine Squadron 1 briefed her commanding officer on her next assignment, the delivery of supplies at Buna on the coast of New Guinea in support of Japanese forces fighting in the New Guinea campaign. She departed Rabaul at 12:00 on 14 January 1943 on her first supply run, arrived at the Mambare River estuary at Buna on 17 January, unloaded cargo and embarked 47 soldiers, and put back to sea, returning to Rabaul at 09:36 on 18 January 1943. She left Rabaul on her second run at 18:06 on 22 January 1943, arriving at the Mambare River on 24 January to unload 13 supply drums and bring aboard 39 soldiers, and returning to Rabaul on 27 January 1943. On her next run to New Guinea, she visited the Mambare on 30 January 1943, delivering 23 tons of supplies and evacuating 59 soldiers.

I-36 remained active on the Buna run into February 1943, departing Rabaul at 11:00 on 3 February, visiting the Mambare estuary on 5 February to discharge 18 tons of supplies and embark 40 soldiers, and returning to Rabaul at 08:14 on 7 February. She then began runs to Lae, also on New Guinea's coast, departing Rabaul on 14 February 1943 and delivering 45 tons of supplies at Lae after dark on 16 February, and getting back underway after embarking 90 soldiers. Early in her return voyage to Rabaul, she sighted two Allied motor torpedo boats 50 nautical miles (93 km; 58 mi) off Lae at 01:10 on 17 February 1943 and submerged. They subjected her to a brief depth-charge attack, but she escaped unscathed and arrived at Rabaul at 10:00 on 18 February 1943. She then made her final run to Lae, leaving Rabaul at 10:00 on 20 February 1943, visiting Lae after dark on 22 February to drop off 40 tons of supplies and bring 72 soldiers aboard, and returning to Rabaul at 08:50 on 24 February 1943.

Several staff officers of Submarine Squadron 1 boarded I-36 with their luggage and documents at Rabaul, and she got underway at 0900 on 25 February bound for Truk, which she visited from 27 February to 2 March 1943. Then she headed for Japan, where she arrived at Yokosuka at 07:00 on 7 March 1943. Her crew was granted four weeks of leave at the resort at Atami while I-36 underwent upkeep and repairs.

=== Typhoon ===
At 15:30 on 6 April 1943, I-36 departed Yokosuka bound for Truk. Her voyage had barely begun, however, when a typhoon struck while she was in the Philippine Sea. The weather prevented her from completing the recharging of her batteries, forcing her to stay surfaced while 30-foot (9.1 m) waves pummeled her. She turned back to try to find shelter from the worst of the storm in the lee of Miyake-jima in the Izu Islands. Early on the morning of 7 April 1943, a huge wave swamped her, flooding her control room and main engine room. Inspecting the damage, her crew found one bent piston rod in each of her diesel engines. I-36 turned back for Yokosuka, dumping diesel fuel along the way to gain additional buoyancy.

On 8 April 1943, I-36 was 80 nautical miles (150 km; 92 mi) east of Chōshi lighthouse on Honshu when she finally was able to determine her true position for the first time since departing Yokosuka. With her starboard diesel engine repaired, she made for Yokosuka at 9.2 knots (17.0 km/h; 10.6 mph). She reached Yokosuka on 9 April 1943 at 09:30 and subsequently began repairs at Yokosuka Navy Yard.

=== Aleutian Islands campaign ===
On 13 May 1943, I-36 was assigned to the Northern Unit in the 5th Fleet for service in the Aleutian Islands campaign. Before departing Japan for the Aleutian Islands, she took part in towing tests for the Unkato cargo container — a 135-foot (41.1 m) submersible cargo container that could carry up to 377 tons of supplies, designed for a one-way trip in which the cargo's recipients released, recovered, and unloaded it — in the Seto Inland Sea on 29–30 May 1943 and again from 3 to 5 June 1943. She then departed Kure at 10:00 on 7 June 1943 bound for Paramushiro in the Kurile Islands, which she reached on 13 June 1943.

Upon I-36′s arrival, her commanding officer received a briefing on the situation in the Aleutians from the commander of Submarine Squadron 1. The Americans had annihilated the Japanese garrison on Attu during the Battle of Attu of 11–30 May 1943, isolating the last remaining Japanese garrison on Kiska. Even before the fall of Attu, Japanese Imperial General Headquarters had decided on 21 May 1943 to evacuate the Kiska garrison by submarine beginning on 26 May 1943. I-36 was assigned to the effort to keep the Kiska garrison supplied while continuing the ongoing evacuation.

Towing an Unkato supply container, I-36 got underway from Paramushiro at 10:00 on 15 June 1943 for her first supply run, with an estimated time of arrival at Kiska of 19 June. She soon lost the Unkato container in heavy seas, and while heading northeast at 12 knots (22 km/h; 14 mph) on 17 June 1943, she nearly ran aground on Middle Reef in the North Pacific Ocean south of Buldir Island. Concerned with an alarming rise in losses and near-losses of submarines in the Aleutians — including I-36′s near-grounding — the commander of Submarine Squadron 1 ordered the suspension of the Kiska supply effort on 21 June 1943, and I-36 turned back. She was in the Bering Sea 30 nautical miles (56 km; 35 mi) north of Kiska an hour before dawn on 24 June 1943 when Submarine Squadron 1 ordered her to abandon her supply mission entirely and return to Paramushiro, which she reached on 25 June. I-36 and the submarine I-169 refueled from the oiler Teiyō Maru on 27 June 1943.

I-36 departed Paramushiro on 2 July 1943 for an operating area east and north of Kiska. The Japanese completed the evacuation of Kiska on 28 July, and after an uneventful patrol, I-36 received orders on 4 August 1943 to return to Paramushiro. On 6 August, she got underway from Paramushiro and set course for Yokosuka, which she reached on 10 August 1943 to undergo an overhaul and have a radar detector installed.

=== Hawaii reconnaissance operation ===
On 16 August 1943, Combined Fleet Headquarters ordered I-36 to conduct a reconnaissance seaplane flight over Pearl Harbor in Hawaii, with the flight to take place on or about 20 September 1943. She embarked a Yokosuka E14Y1 (Allied reporting name "Glen") floatplane and its two-man crew and began launch and recovery tests with the plane in the Seto Inland Sea. During a launch test on 5 September 1943, one of her diesel engines broke down, and she returned to Yokosuka for repairs.

I-36 departed Yokosuka on 8 September 1943 bound for Hawaii with an E14Y1 floatplane, its two-man crew, and the Combined Fleet's Staff Operations Officer for Submarines embarked, the latter personally supervising the operation. She was 40 nautical miles (74 km; 46 mi) north of Niihau, Hawaii, on 18 September 1943 when her radar detector picked up nearby radar emissions, and soon thereafter her lookouts sighted a large American patrol plane approaching. She crash-dived and avoided detection. At dawn on 20 September 1943, she was off the western tip of Niihau and surfaced several times to launch her plane, but made numerous contacts and submerged again each time. Deciding that a radar station on nearby Kauai could be detecting I-36 when she surfaced, her commanding officer and the Combined Fleet staff officer decided to move to waters southwest of the island of Hawaii, believing I-36 was likely to be detected there, and to postpone the flight until the next favorable moon phase in mid-October 1943.

With I-36 200 nautical miles (370 km; 230 mi) southeast of Hawaii on 12 October, the two officers decided to launch the E14Y1 from a point 120 nautical miles (220 km; 140 mi) south-southwest of Oahu after dark on 16 October 1943. Accordingly, I-36 launched the plane from that point on the evening of 16 October. The plane approached Oahu at minimum altitude to avoid detection by American radar, but was detected when it climbed over Pearl Harbor to make its observations. Several searchlights illuminated it, and it dived away to head for the recovery area at low altitude. As it crossed the coast of Oahu, its observer transmitted a single dash in Morse code, prompting I-36 to head for the recovery area at flank speed. I-36 received a garbled message from the plane indicating the sighting of four aircraft carriers, four battleships, five cruisers, and 17 destroyers in the harbor, but she never saw or heard from the plane and its two-man crew again despite searching the recovery area for five hours, flashing her running lights and an Aldis lamp, and making a number of efforts to establish radio contact with it. She transmitted a report of the reconnaissance flight's results and the loss of the floatplane and its crew to 6th Fleet headquarters on 18 October 1943.

I-36 was 300 nautical miles (560 km; 350 mi) south-southwest of Hawaii on 19 October 1943 when she sighted a convoy of six U.S. Navy fleet oilers steaming southwest at 10 knots (19 km/h; 12 mph) and began an attack approach, but escorting destroyers forced her to go deep and lose contact. She reported the sighting on 20 October, prompting the 6th Fleet to order the submarines I-19, I-35, I-169, and I-175 to intercept the convoy. She also received orders on 20 October 1943 to shell the airfield on Canton Island, which she did on 1 November 1943, firing 13 140-millimeter (5.5 in) rounds. She called at Kwajalein from 7 to 9 November 1943 to refuel, then arrived at Truk on 12 November 1943.

=== New Guinea campaign, December 1943–January 1944 ===
While at Truk during December 1943, I-36 took aboard torpedoes, distilled water, stores, and supplies from the auxiliary submarine tender Heian Maru. Reassigned to the Southeast Area Fleet on 18 December, she got underway on 21 December bound for Rabaul to resume her role of running supplies to New Guinea. She arrived at Rabaul on 24 December 1943, and that day aircraft of the United States Army Air Forces Fifth Air Force attacked Japanese airfields in the area. To avoid attack, I-36 submerged and waited on the harbor bottom until the American aircraft had left.

On 28 December 1943, I-36 embarked on a supply run to Sarmi on the northern coast of New Guinea, where she surfaced a half hour after dark on 31 December 1943 and began to transfer her cargo into four Daihatsus. When an Allied bomber arrived in the area, she suspended the unloading of her cargo, crash-dived, and moved out to sea until the bomber departed. She then returned to Sarmi, completed unloading her cargo into the Daihatsus, and got back underway, returning to Rabaul on 2 January 1944. While she was there, a routine inspection discovered significant erosion of the tiller for her stern planes. As a result, she received orders to cancel her next supply run and return to Japan for repairs. She departed Rabaul on 5 January 1944, was reassigned to Submarine Squadron 1 on 6 January while at sea, called at Truk from 9 to 10 January, was attached directly to 6th Fleet headquarters when Submarine Squadron 1 was disbanded while she was at sea on 15 January, and arrived at Sasebo on 16 January 1944. She entered drydock there on 17 January 1944 for an overhaul, during which workers installed radar aboard her.

=== Marshall Islands ===
In January and February 1944, U.S. forces concluded the Gilbert and Marshall Islands campaign, invading the Marshall Islands and capturing Kwajalein, Roi-Namur, Majuro, and Eniwetok′s Engebi and Parry Islands. After embarking a Yokosuka E14Y1 floatplane, I-36 departed Kure on 26 March 1944 with orders to conduct an anti-shipping patrol in the Pacific Ocean east of the Marshalls and a reconnaissance of the Allied anchorage at Majuro. Alerted by Ultra intelligence information to the operations of I-36 and the submarines I-16, I-38, and I-45 between the Marshalls and Hawaii, United States Pacific Fleet Headquarters organized Task Group 11.1 — a hunter-killer group consisting of the escort aircraft carrier USS Altamaha and the destroyer escorts USS Cabana, USS Elden, USS Harold C. Thomas, and USS Wileman — on 30 March 1944 to find and sink them. The task group's first success came on 4 April 1944, when aircraft from Altamaha crippled I-45 and forced her to return to base.

Around 14:00 on 14 April 1944, I-36 detected propeller noises. She later sighted Altamaha in the vicinity of 14°00′N 177°30′W and began a lengthy pursuit. She finally achieved a firing position at 18:30 on 15 April as Altamaha turned into the wind to recover aircraft, although I-36's attack set-up was spoiled when one of the destroyer escorts turned sharply toward her. I-36 fired six torpedoes at Altamaha anyway from a range of 2,200 yards (2,000 m) and dived to a depth of 100 feet (30 m), hearing two explosions 2 minutes and 10 seconds after launch. Altamaha's lookouts, meanwhile, sighted between two and four torpedo wakes to the southwest at a range of 4,000 yards (3,700 m) at 18:44 and Altamaha made a hard turn to starboard at flank speed to avoid them. A minute later, two torpedoes passed Altamaha 200 yards (180 m) off her port beam, running parallel to her new course. The task group's destroyer escorts attempted to find I-36 but did not succeed, and the encounter ended without damage to either side.

At 16:55 on 22 April 1944, I-36 launched her floatplane off Majuro. Flying over the anchorage at 3,900 feet (1,200 m), the plane's observer reported sighting 11 aircraft carriers and three battleships. The plane's pilot could not find I-36 during the return flight, and I-36 did not locate the plane and recover its crew until dawn on 23 April 1944. To avoid detection by Allied forces, she scuttled the plane rather than spend more time on the surface recovering it, and then departed the area. She transmitted a report of the flight's findings on 23 April 1944.

I-36 was on the surface when an Allied patrol plane attacked her at 21:25 on 30 April 1944. She crash-dived to 260 feet (79 m). Several more aircraft arrived and dropped depth charges, creating a number of leaks aboard I-36 and causing her to assume a steep down-angle, but her crew quickly got her back under control. She escaped the planes and her crew soon repaired her damage. She arrived at Kure on 9 May 1944 and the 6th Fleet mistakenly credited her with sinking Altamaha.

In May 1944 I-36, the submarines I-38, I-41, and I-44, and the auxiliary submarine tender Tsukushi Maru began training in the Seto Inland Sea off Nasakejima for Operation Tatsumaki ("Tornado"), which called for the submarines to transport modified Type 4 Ka-Tsu amphibious tracked landing craft, each armed with two 450-millimeter (17.7 in) torpedoes, from Kure to Majuro. After the submarines launched the Ka-Tsu vehicles, the operation called for the vehicles to proceed to shore, move overland across the atoll's islands, then enter the water in the lagoon and attack Allied ships with torpedoes. I-36 herself carried out diving tests in the Aki-nada in the Seto Inland Sea with two Ka-Tsu vehicles embarked on 23 May 1944, after which Operation Tatsumaki was postponed pending the correction of defects found in the vehicles. The operation later was canceled entirely.

=== June–November 1944 ===
On 19 June 1944, I-36 departed Kure on a supply run to Truk, carrying diesel fuel, torpedoes, and ammunition. She called at Truk from 30 June to 5 July 1944, where she unloaded her cargo and brought aboard 86 passengers for her return trip to Japan. She arrived at Kure on 16 July 1944.

I-36 was selected on 1 September 1944 for conversion to carry kaiten manned suicide attack torpedoes. She took part in kaiten launch exercises off the kaiten base at Otsujima in Tokuyama Bay on 28 September 1944, and by October 1944 her 140-millimeter (5.5 in) gun had been removed to make room for fittings that allowed her to carry four kaitens on her after deck, two of them with access tubes allowing their pilots to man them while I-36 was submerged. On 7 November 1944, the commander of the 6th Fleet, Vice Admiral Shigeyoshi Miwa, informed the crew of plans for a kaiten attack on the United States Third Fleet anchorage at Ulithi Atoll.

=== First kaiten mission ===
I-36 and the submarines I-37 and I-47 formed the Kikusui ("Floating Chrysanthemum") Group, with I-36 as the group's flagship. The three submarines, each armed with four kaitens and eight conventional torpedoes and with the commander of Submarine Division 15 embarked on I-36 as the group's overall commander, got underway from Otsujima at 09:00, with I-36 and I-47 tasked to launch their kaiten attack at Ulithi Atoll while I-37 launched her kaitens to attack Allied shipping at Palau. On 16 November 1944, the submarines received a report from a Nakajima C6N1 Saiun ("Iridescent Cloud"; Allied reporting name "Myrt") reconnaissance aircraft which made a high-altitude flight over Ulithi Atoll and sighted four fleet aircraft carriers and three battleships as well as cruisers and destroyers in the north central part of the lagoon and transports, oilers, and other ships in the south-central part. I-36 and I-47 reached the waters off Ulithi on 19 November, and I-36 headed for her launch area at the entrance to Mugai Channel, the eastern opening to the Ulithi anchorage.

I-36 surfaced north of Loosiyep Islet at 00:30 on 20 November 1944 so that the pilots of the two kaitens without underwater access tubes could man their craft. She then submerged. After 0300, the other two kaiten pilots manned their kaitens via the underwater access tubes. Her crew soon discovered that the two access-tube-equipped kaitens were wedged in their racks and could not launch, and one of the other kaitens developed a heavy leak in its pilot compartment. She launched her only other kaiten at 04:15 9.5 nautical miles (17.6 km; 10.9 mi) east-southeast of Masi Inlet; the destroyer USS Case (DD-370) probably rammed and sank it 2 nautical miles (3.7 km; 2.3 mi) south of Mugai Channel at 05:38. Meanwhile, I-36 surfaced 15 nautical miles (28 km; 17 mi) east of Falalop Islet to extricate the pilot of the leaking kaiten on her afterdeck. Immediately after I-36 brought him back aboard, two aircraft which I-36′s crew identified as Grumman Avengers attacked her, but she crash-dived and avoided damage. As she departed the area at full speed, she heard two heavy explosions, one at 05:45 and another at 06:05. She surfaced at 23:40 to recharge her batteries, then set course for the Philippines area, where she was ordered to conduct an anti-shipping patrol off Leyte. She transmitted a report of the results of her kaiten attack on 23 November 1944.

On 23 November, a Truk-based C6N1 ("Myrt") flew over Ulithi to assess the damage resulting from the kaiten attack. It reported a large oil slick in the harbor but no change in the number of anchored vessels. On 24 November 1944, I-36 and I-47 received orders to cancel their planned patrols off Leyte and return to Japan. After a stop at Otsujima to drop off their remaining kaitens and kaiten pilots, the two submarines arrived at Kure on 30 November 1944.

On 2 December 1944, over 200 staff officers and specialists convened aboard the 6th Fleet flagship Tsukushi Maru to evaluate the results of the kaiten attack on Ulithi Atoll. After examining after-action reports and post-attack reconnaissance photographs, they credited the attack with sinking three aircraft carriers and two battleships. In fact, the only ship sunk had been the fleet oiler USS Mississinewa (AO-59), by a kaiten from I-47.

=== Second kaiten mission ===
At Kure, I-36 began preparations on 22 December 1944 for her second kaiten mission and visited Otsujima to pick up four kaitens and their pilots on 27 December. On 29 December 1944, I-36 was assigned to the Kongo ("Steel") Kaiten Group along with the submarines I-47, I-48, I-53, I-56, and I-58 for an attack scheduled for dawn on 11 January 1945 on five different U.S. anchorages in widely separated locations; the date of the attack later was postponed to 12 January 1945.

I-36 departed Kure on 30 December 1944 in company with I-53 and I-58, bound for her target, Ulithi Atoll. While approaching Ulithi she ran aground on a reef on 11 January 1945, but managed to free herself by blowing her main ballast tanks. On 12 January 1945, she launched her four kaitens between 03:42 and 03:57. A U.S. Navy PBM Mariner flying boat of Patrol Bombing Squadron 21 (VPB-21) dropped four depth charges on one of I-36′s kaitens in the lagoon and sank it. I-36 returned to Kure on 21 January 1945, and the Japanese credited her kaitens with sinking four ships, but post-World War II analysis concluded that they damaged the ammunition ship USS Mazama (AE-9) and sank the landing craft infantry USS LCI-600.

=== Third kaiten mission ===
On 28 February 1945: I-36 and I-58 formed the Shimbu ("Divine Warriors") Group to attack American shipping off Iwo Jima, where the Battle of Iwo Jima had begun on 19 February 1945. I-36 departed the kaiten base at Hikari carrying four kaitens. On 6 March 1945, however, the Combined Fleet ordered the 6th Fleet to cease operations off Iwo Jima, and I-36 returned to Kure on 10 March 1945.

In mid-March 1945, I-36 underwent a conversion in which her aircraft hangar and catapult were removed from her foredeck and replaced by fittings to carry two more kaitens, bringing her kaiten capacity to six. All of her kaiten racks were fitted with access tubes to allow their pilots to man them while I-36 was submerged, and a new air-search radar was installed.

=== Fourth kaiten mission ===
The Battle of Okinawa began on 1 April 1945 with the U.S. landings on Okinawa. On 22 April 1945, I-36 departed Hikari carrying six kaitens to patrol in the Philippine Sea between the Mariana Islands and Okinawa as part of the Tembu ("Heavenly Warriors") Group. She sighted a U.S. Navy PBM Mariner on an antisubmarine patrol off Iheya Island in darkness on 25 April 1945. Early on the morning of 27 April 1945, she sighted a 28-ship U.S. convoy of tank landing ships and medium landing ships bound from Saipan to Okinawa, at least some of which she misidentified as transports. Two of her kaitens malfunctioned, but she launched the other four. At 08:23, the high-speed transport USS Ringness (APD-100) sighted a passing torpedo wake, and at 08:25 her lookouts spotted a periscope astern of her. She dropped four depth charges at the location she had sighted the periscope, and at 08:45 witnessed a huge explosion at 24°07′N 132°39′E, followed by debris rising to the surface. The destroyer escort USS Fieberling (DE-640), escorting the same convoy, also sighted a torpedo. I-36 claimed her kaitens sank four transports, but in fact they had no success against the convoy. She returned to Hikari on 30 April 1945 and disembarked her two remaining kaitens and their pilots.

I-36 was engaged in kaiten training off Otsujima on 17 May 1945 when one of her kaitens, carrying a dummy warhead, collided with a target and sank, killing its pilot.

=== Fifth kaiten mission ===
On 4 June 1945, I-36 put to sea to patrol in the Philippine Sea as part of the Todoroki ("Sound of Great Cannon") Group. She was on the surface in the East China Sea west of Osumi Kaikyo at 32°44′N 129°15′E on 10 June 1945 when the submarine USS Tirante (SS-420) — which misidentified her as a "RO-type submarine" — attacked her, firing two Mark 18 torpedoes, which both missed. On 22 June 1945, I-36 sighted the unaccompanied landing craft repair ship USS Endymion (ARL-9), which she mistook for an oiler. I-36 tried to launch two kaitens, but they both malfunctioned, so she fired four conventional torpedoes, all of which exploded prematurely. The explosions slightly damaged Endymion and I-36′s commanding officer thought she took on a list, but Endymion put on speed and escaped.

On 28 June 1945, I-36 was 400 nautical miles (740 km; 460 mi) north-northeast of Truk when she sighted the stores ship USS Antares (AKS-3) steaming alone from Saipan to Pearl Harbor at 13°10′N 154°57′E and launched a kaiten. Antares sighted the kaiten′s periscope and wake 100 yards (91 m) off her starboard quarter at 13:29 and turned hard to starboard, causing the kaiten to miss her astern. Her lookouts then spotted the kaiten in her wake to port, turning to the right. At 13:31, Antares opened fire on kaiten′s periscope and began to zigzag, and as her stern swung to starboard one of her 3-inch (76.2 mm) guns hit the kaiten, which disappeared. At 13:44, Antares sighted I-36′s periscope, and I-36 broached. Antares opened fire on I-36 with her aft 5-inch (127 mm) gun.

Antares signaled the destroyer USS Sproston (DD-577), which was steaming independently to the United States for overhaul, that she was under attack, and when Sproston arrived on the scene she made sonar contact with I-36 at a range of 1,000 yards (910 m). At a range of 500 yards (460 m) she sighted a periscope passing from starboard to port and tried to ram the submarine without success, then dropped a full pattern of depth charges, later seeing an oil slick on the surface. She made six more depth-charge attacks without success. Meanwhile, aboard I-36, a leak began in the forward torpedo room after more than 10 depth-charge explosions, and she launched two more kaitens from a depth of 200 feet (61 m). After Sproston sighted the wake of an approaching kaiten 60 degrees off her port bow, she turned hard to port, causing the kaiten to pass down her port side. Sproston then sighted a kaiten′s periscope off her port quarter and opened fire on it with her main battery, hitting the kaiten and triggering a large secondary explosion. Other ships then arrived to increase the overnight radar coverage of the area, and on the morning of 29 June 1945 three destroyer escorts arrived to assist in the hunt for I-36. After a thorough search of the area, all the ships departed. I-36 escaped with a damaged rudder. She was east of Guam on 29 June when her sound operator heard a distant explosion at around 10:00 and later several more explosions identified as those of depth charges.

I-36 made for Japan. She was in the Bungo Strait 11 nautical miles (20 km; 13 mi) south of Okinoshima on 9 July 1945 when the submarine USS Gunnel (SS-253) attacked her, mistaking her for a Ro-60-class submarine, at 32°40′N 132°34′E. All four of Gunnel′s torpedoes missed astern, and I-36 arrived at Hikari later that day to disembark her remaining kaitens and their pilots, and during the afternoon continued on to Kure, where she entered drydock for repairs.

=== End of war ===
Undocked early on the morning of 6 August 1945, I-36 moved into the harbor at Kure and moored to a buoy. Later that morning, her crew witnessed the atomic bombing of Hiroshima. She was in the Hayase Seto Channel in Hiroshima Bay on 11 August 1945, preparing to get underway for the submarine base at Hirao to participate in the Shinshu-tai ("Divine Country Unit") kaiten mission when two Iwo Jima-based U.S. Army Air Forces P-51 Mustang fighters subjected her to a strafing attack at 10:40. The attack wounded her commanding officer and navigation officer and damaged a diesel fuel tank and a radar. Repairs were estimated to take eight days.

On 15 August 1945, I-36 and I-47 were at Kure when Emperor Hirohito made his surrender broadcast announcing the cessation of hostilities between Japan and the Allies. I-36 was the only Type B1 submarine to survive World War II.

== Final disposition ==
I-36 surrendered to Allied forces in September 1945. She was inspected at Kure on 5 October 1945 and found to have a partial crew of 55, over 100 tons of diesel fuel, and 20 tons of fresh water aboard, and all of her weapons and usable equipment had been removed. She later was transferred from Kure to Sasebo and stripped of all remaining useful equipment and valuable materials. The Japanese struck her from the Navy list on 30 November 1945.

The submarine tender USS Nereus (AS-17) eventually towed I-36 from Sasebo to an area off the Goto Islands, where on 1 April 1946 she was among 24 Japanese submarines scuttled in Operation Road's End. She was lashed to the submarine Ha-106, and the two submarines were sunk together using demolition charges at 15:58 at 32°37′N 129°17′E.

== Sources ==
- Hackett, Bob & Kingsepp, Sander. IJN Submarine I-36: Tabular Record of Movement. Retrieved on August 29, 2020.
- Milanovich, Kathrin (2021). "The IJN Submarines of the I 15 Class". In Jordan, John (ed.). Warship 2021. Oxford, UK: Osprey Publishing. pp. 29–43. ISBN 978-1-4728-4779-9.
