= Japanese submarine I-41 =

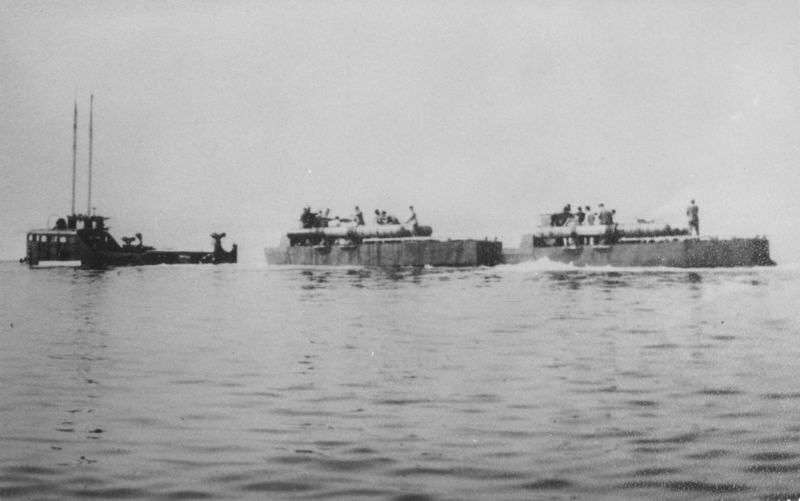
- I-41 during training exercises with two Type 4 Ka-Tsu torpedo APC, April 1944

History

Japan
- Name: I-41
- Builder: Kure Naval Arsenal
- Laid down: 18 March 1942
- Launched: 10 November 1942
- Commissioned: 18 September 1943
- In service: 1943-44
- Stricken: 2 December 1944
- Fate: Sunk, 18 November 1944

General characteristics
- Class & type: Type B2 submarine
- Displacement: 2,624 tons surfaced; 3,700 tons submerged
- Length: 356.5 ft (108.7 m)
- Beam: 30.5 ft (9.3 m)
- Draft: 17 ft (5.2 m)
- Propulsion: 2 diesels: 11,000 hp (8,200 kW); Electric motors: 2,000 hp (1,500 kW)
- Speed: 23.5 knots (43.5 km/h) surfaced; 8 knots (15 km/h) submerged
- Range: 14,000 nautical miles (26,000 km) at 16 knots (30 km/h)
- Test depth: 100 m (330 ft)
- Complement: 114
- Armament: 6 × 533 mm (21 in) forward torpedo tubes; 17 torpedoes; 1 × 14 cm (5.5 in) Deck Gun

I-41 was an Imperial Japanese Navy B2 type submarine. She was completed at Kure Navy Yard on 18 September 1943, whereupon she entered into service with the Imperial Japanese Navy Yokosuka Naval District, SubRon 11, and sailed to Yokosuka for final trials under the command of Lt. Commander Tamori Yoshimatsu. This was completed by 15 December 1943 and command was transferred to Lt. Commander Itakura Mitsuma. I-41 was reassigned to the Sixth Fleet in SubRon 1's Sub Division 15.

== World War II service ==
=== Supply submarine ===
On 29 December 1943 the new submarine departed Tokosuka for Truk. Arriving at Truk on New Years Day 1944, her deck gun and all of her torpedoes were taken on shore to prepare the sub for a supply mission. Nine days later I-41 was designated as the flagship of SubDiv 15. On 15 January 1943 I-41 sailed from Truk for Rabaul. While en route, SubRon1 was disbanded and the submarine was attached directly to the Sixth Fleet Headquarters. She docked at Rabaul on 19 January 1944, loaded supplies, and left four days later on her first supply run to Sarmi, New Guinea. I-41 arrived at Sarmi on 25 January and unloaded, departing immediately to return to Rabaul. She arrived there on 27 January. Heading to sea again on 31 January the submarine made for Bougainville Island. After evading minefields and enemy patrols she arrived at Buin, unloaded on 4 February, and returned to Rabaul on 7 February. Between 12 February and 24 February she made another supply run to Buin, tying up at Rabaul once again before setting out for Truk on 27 February carrying 98 naval pilots and staff officers as passengers, including the commanding officer of the 501st Naval Air Group. She arrived safely at Truk on 2 March and discharged her passengers. She sailed on 7 March toward Rabaul, but was recalled to Truk on the 9th.

After a week's respite I-41 sailed for Rabaul once again on 15 March. While en route, on March 19, I-41 was running surfaced north of Rabaul when she was attacked by two torpedoes from an unknown enemy submarine. The lookouts saw the "fish" in time and Lt. Commander Itakura was able to evade the attack by turning sharply to port; the nearest torpedo passed 55 yards ahead of the submarine. Upon arrival at Rabaul the next day she was reassigned to SubRon 7.

USN Fleet Radio Unit Melbourne (FRUMEL) intercepted and decoded a message the same day indicating that I-41 was expected to leave Rabaul at 0300 on 21st, pass through 3-08S, 149-21E at 0200 on 23rd, and arrive Truk at 1330 on 25th. This was accurate information. The sub left at the appointed time transporting 98 passengers including the CO of SubRon 7, Rear Admiral Owada Noboru, his staff, and a number of airmen. While she was en route FRUMEL intercepted another message reading, "Expect submarine I-41 to arrive South Channel about 0900 tomorrow 25th." This was also accurate. Despite this, the submarine was not attacked and arrived safely at Truk on 25 March. She was escorted in through the south channel by Kinpo Maru No. 1.

=== Operation Tatsumaki ===
In April 1944, I-41 was selected as one of several submarines to participate in an amphibious assault on Majuro in the Marshall Islands. She was ordered to train with I-36, I-38, I-44, and I-53 for this attack, which called for the submarines to carry Type 4 Ka-Tsu amphibious landing crafts armed with torpedoes from Kure to Majuro. Once there they would be put ashore, make their way overland, and enter the water again to attack ships in harbor there. The plan was cancelled before it could be realized.

=== Return to supply duty ===
With the cancellation of Operation Tatsumaki, I-41 returned to her previous duties as a supply sub. She left Truk on 1 April 1944, making her third run to Buin with 50 tons of food. She arrived on 7 April, unloaded her cargo, embarked 73 passengers, and returned to Truk. I-41 docked at Truk on 13 April. Her deck gun was remounted during her layover in Truk Lagoon. In recognition of I-41's successful supply runs, Lt. Commander Itakura was given a gift of cigarettes from Vice Admiral Takagi Takeo, the CINC of the Sixth Fleet. On 19 April the sub departed Truk for Yokosuka, where she arrived on the 25th. She was then transferred to Kure.

=== First War patrol ===
After needed upkeep, I-41 departed Kure to patrol between the Admiralty Islands and Wewak, New Guinea, on 15 May 1944. No targets were sighted, but while still on patrol 13 June word was received by Admiral Toyoda Soemu, CINC, Combined Fleet, that the American anchorage at Marujo was empty. The admiral ordered Vice Admiral Takagi to redeploy his boats, I-41 among them, toward the Marianas. I-41 received the order the next day, being dispatched to a region South of Guam at best possible speed.

On 15 June 1944 the American invasion of Saipan started. As a result, communication with Vice Admiral Takagi Takeo and Sixth Fleet Command was disrupted and command of sixth fleet submarines passed to Rear Admiral Owada Noboru of SubRon 7 at Truk. In his final message sent from the island, Takagi announced he and his staff were planning to join a banzai charge imminently. He was promoted to Admiral, posthumously. Following this, I-41 was redirected to a patrol area southeast of the Marianas in the company of the submarines Ro-113, Ro-114, Ro-115, and Ro-116.

On 22 June 1944, I-41 was detached from her group and ordered to Guam to evacuate naval aviators stranded there. She arrived two days later and surveyed the island from periscope depth in search of a suitable embarkation point. After sunset she surfaced 1,100 yards offshore and contacted units on land. Two barges managed to transfer a total of 106 pilots (mostly from the 705th Naval Air Group) before an approaching patrol bomber (a Consolidated B-24 Liberator) forced the submarine to dive. Further embarkation was aborted. The submarine and her passengers returned to Ōita on Kyushu, landing there on 30 June 1944.

Beginning 1 July, the submarine arrived at Kure and commenced battle training. On 5 August command of the submarine was transferred to Lt. Commander Kondo Fumitake, the former CO of Ro-112; training continued until 9 October, when I-41 was transferred to the Otsujima Kaiten base in the Inland Sea to train human torpedo crews, returning to Kure thereafter.

=== Second War patrol ===
On 13 October Operation Sho-I-Go (Defense of the Philippines) was ordered. Six days later I-41 departed Kure to patrol east of the Philippines. The next day an American fleet of 738 ships landed on Leyte, precipitating an order to I-41 to proceed at flank speed to a patrol area east of Leyte. There she operated in tandem with I-38. I-41 reported sinking an American transport on 27 October, but there is no corroborating loss on the American side.

On 30 October the submarine reported sighting a task force with three aircraft carriers 220 miles east by northeast of Suluan Island but was not able to engage. A few days later, on 3 November, I-41's lookouts sighted what they believed was an aircraft carrier near the San Bernardino Strait, in the company of other ships. It is possible this was USS Lexington, which was in the area at the time. At 2330 hours Lt. Commander Kondo set up his shot and fired a salvo of four type 95 torpedoes at the target. Two of these torpedoes hit the light cruiser USS Reno, one failed to detonate but the other left Reno dead in the water, listing at 16 degrees to port, and down by the stern. Reno nearly sank but was just barely kept afloat by excellent damage control and was later towed to Ulithi by the tug USS Zuni. However, Reno had been damaged so badly that I-41 permanently ended the cruiser's participation in the war, with Reno only finishing repairs in October 1945.

Kondo reported sinking a carrier, but in fact no hits were scored on any carrier, a Yokosuka P1Y "Frances" attack bomber "confirmed" Lt. Commander Kondo's claim and he was awarded a special citation from Emperor Hirohito. On 12 November 1944 Lt. Commander Kondo reported attacking another task force. This communication was the last word received from I-41.

=== Loss ===
East of Samar on 18 November 1944 during an ASW patrol in the Philippine Sea, Task Group 30.7's USS Anzio was alerted to the presence of a Japanese submarine in her operating area by an "Ultra" signals-intelligence message. Anzio's aircraft conducted an ASW sweep. One of the aircraft reported a radar contact on a submarine on the surface. After a 14-hour hunt, USS Lawrence C. Taylor, in a coordinated depth charge attack with her sister ship USS Melvin R. Nawman and two planes from Anzio, sank I-41 at 12°44′N 130°42′E. There were no survivors. Overdue from patrol, I-41 was presumed lost with all hands on 2 December 1944 and removed from the Navy List on 10 March 1945.

== Sources ==
- Hackett, Bob & Kingsepp, Sander. IJN Submarine I-41: Tabular Record of Movement. http://www.combinedfleet.com/I-41.htm. Retrieved on July 23, 2014.
- Jentschura, Hansgeorg; Jung, Dieter & Mickel, Peter (1977). Warships of the Imperial Japanese Navy, 1869–1945. Annapolis, Maryland: United States Naval Institute. ISBN 978-0-87021-893-4.
