= Japanese submarine I-38 =

Type B1 submarine

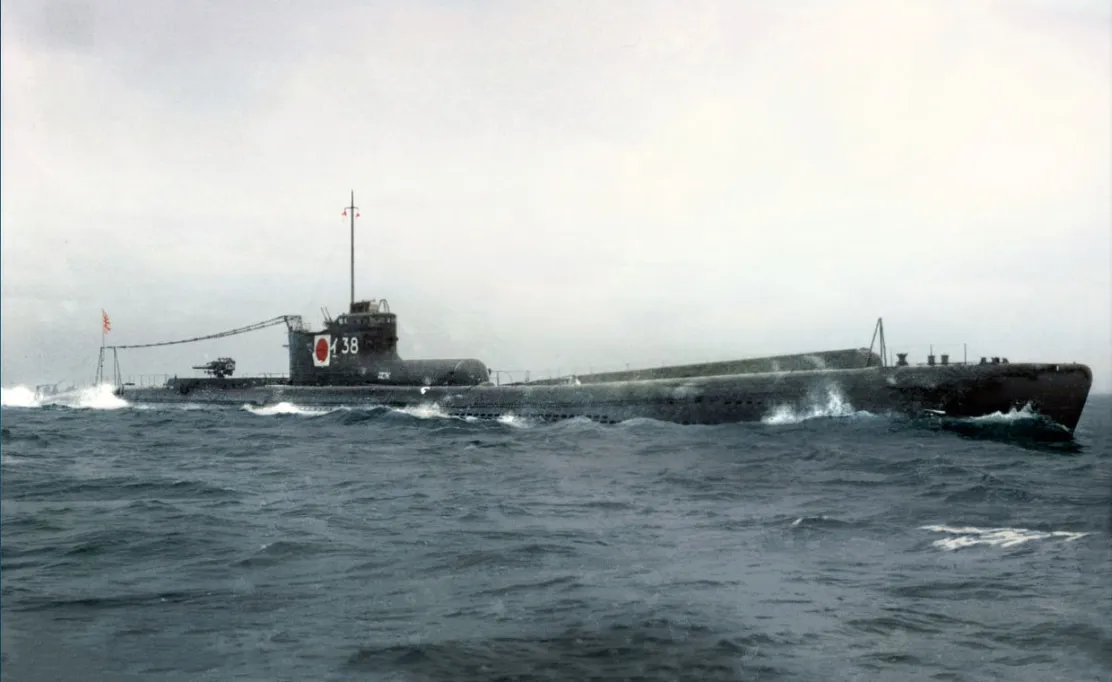
- I-38 on sea trials, January 1943

History

Japan
- Name: Submarine No. 151
- Builder: Sasebo Navy Yard, Sasebo, Japan
- Laid down: 19 June 1941
- Renamed: I-38
- Launched: 15 April 1942
- Completed: 31 January 1943
- Commissioned: 31 January 1943
- Fate: Missing after 7 November 1944; Probably sunk 13 November 1944
- Stricken: 10 March 1945

General characteristics
- Class & type: Type B1 submarine
- Displacement: 2,584 tons surfaced; 3,654 tons submerged
- Length: 108.7 m (357 ft)
- Beam: 9.3 m (31 ft)
- Draft: 5.14 m (16.9 ft)
- Propulsion: 2 diesels: 12,400 hp (9,200 kW); Electric motors: 2,000 hp (1,500 kW)
- Speed: 23.5 knots (43.5 km/h) surfaced; 8 knots (15 km/h) submerged
- Range: 14,000 nautical miles (26,000 km) at 16 knots (30 km/h)
- Test depth: 100 m (330 ft)
- Complement: 94
- Armament: 6 × 533 mm (21 in) forward torpedo tubes; 17 torpedoes; 1 × 14 cm/40 11th Year Type naval gun
- Aircraft carried: 1 Yokosuka E14Y seaplane

I-38 was an Imperial Japanese Navy B1 type submarine. Completed and commissioned in 1943, she served in World War II, operating on supply missions in the New Guinea campaign and the Solomon Islands campaign, and conducting war patrols in the Solomons, off the Mariana Islands, and in the Philippine Sea before she was sunk in November 1944.

== Construction and commissioning ==
I-38 was laid down on 19 June 1941 in the Sasebo Navy Yard at Sasebo, Japan, with the name Submarine No. 151. Renamed I-38, she was launched on 15 April 1942 and provisionally attached to the Kure Naval District. She was completed and commissioned on 31 January 1943.

== Service history ==
=== January–May 1943 ===
Upon commissioning, I-38 was attached formally to the Kure Naval District and assigned to the Kure Submarine Squadron. The same day, she got underway to participate in tests of a new type of shallow-depth torpedo in the Seto Inland Sea. After that, she conducted tests of the new Unpoto gun sled, a 70-foot (21.3 m) sled that could carry up to 15 tons of cargo, usually in the form of three Type 96 15-centimeter (5.9 in) howitzers and ammunition for them. She became the first Japanese submarine equipped with fittings to carry an Unpoto. She participated in torpedo practice with the submarines I-37, Ro-104, and Ro-105 on 26 March 1943. On 1 April 1943 she was assigned to Submarine Squadron 11 for work-ups.

With her work-ups completed, I-38 was reassigned to Submarine Division 15 in Submarine Squadron 1 on 30 April 1943. On 8 May 1943, she got underway from Kure with an Unpoto on her afterdeck, paused at Osako, then continued to Saeki, where she spent the night of 8–9 May 1943. She departed Saeki on 9 May with the Unpoto in tow bound for Truk, which she reached on 14 May 1943. During her stay at Truk, the commander-in-chief of the 6th Fleet, Vice Admiral Teruhisa Komatsu, inspected I-38 and her Unpoto installation on 15 May, after which I-38 unloaded her provisions and a repair ship moored alongside her to repair the Unpoto. She was assigned to the Southeast Area Fleet that day. I-38 departed for Rabaul on New Britain on 16 May 1943.

=== New Guinea campaign, May–June 1943 ===
Assigned to supply runs to New Guinea in support of Japanese forces fighting in the New Guinea campaign, I-38 arrived at Rabaul on 18 May 1943. There she detached her Unpoto and transferred some of her provisions to the submarine tender Chōgei, and her commanding officer boarded Chōgei to receive a briefing on the supply operations from the commander of Submarine Squadron 7. On 19 May, she conducted an Unpoto test with the commanders-in-chief of the Southeast Area Fleet, Vice Admiral Jinichi Kusaka, and Eighth Area Army, General Hitoshi Imamura, looking on. She then transferred all remaining provisions in her after storeroom and all but four of her torpedoes to Chōgei.

On 21 May 1943 I-38 set out from Rabaul on her first supply run, bound for Lae on the coast of New Guinea carrying 12 naval officers as passengers and a cargo of 48.6 tons of ammunition and provisions. She arrived at Lae on 23 May, quickly discharged her passengers and cargo, embarked 17 sick and wounded Imperial Japanese Army soldiers, and got back underway for Rabaul. Soon after she departed Lae, a United States Navy PT boat sighted her and fired six torpedoes at her, but they all missed, and I-38 arrived safely at Rabaul on 25 May 1943.

I-38 got underway from Rabaul on 27 May 1943 for her second supply run, carrying 29 Special Naval Landing Forces personnel and a cargo of 48.6 tons of food and medicine. As she approached Lae on 28 May, her lookouts sighted a U.S. Navy PT boat, and she dived to avoid it. That night she dropped off her passengers and cargo, brought aboard six soldiers, and headed back for Rabaul, where she arrived on 31 May 1943. After taking aboard cargo from Goshu Maru, she left Rabaul on her third supply run on 2 June and met a Daihatsu-class landing craft off Lae on 4 June, transferred her cargo to it, embarked General Imamura and three members of his staff for transportation to Eighth Area Army headquarters at Rabaul, and headed back to Rabaul, arriving there on 6 June 1943.

At Rabaul, I-38 loaded cargo from Taisei Maru and an Unpoto sled was mounted on her afterdeck. She departed on 9 June 1943 and headed for New Guinea, discharging some of her cargo at Salamaua on 11 June 1943, then proceeding to Lae, where on 12 June she unloaded the rest of it and disembarked her Unpoto, the first successful delivery of artillery using an Unpoto. She embarked six soldiers, and soon after she left Lae on her return voyage to Rabaul, an Allied plane spotted her and dropped three bombs after she crash-dived. She avoided damage, but another Allied plane forced her to crash-dive again at around midnight. She arrived safely at Rabaul on 13 June 1943.

I-38 refueled from the oiler Naruto at Rabaul on 15 June 1943 and received a new Unpoto sled from Taisei Maru on 17 June. She began her fifth supply run on 19 June, departing Rabaul with 48.5 tons of provisions aboard, calling at Lae to unload them on 21 June, and returning to Rabaul on 23 June 1943. After receiving another new Unpoto from Taisei Maru on 24 June and undergoing maintenance work and having her upper deck repainted on 25 June 1943, I-38 departed on her sixth supply run on 26 June 1943, calling at Lae after dark on 28 June to unload 48.5 tons of provisions and embark 15 soldiers, and then made for Rabaul, which she reached on 30 June 1943.

=== First war patrol ===
After taking aboard supplies from Chōgei on 1 July 1943, I-38 departed Rabaul on 2 July on her first war patrol, ordered to attack Allied shipping in the Solomon Islands, where Japanese forces were fighting in the Solomon Islands campaign, and conduct a reconnaissance of Kula Gulf. She arrived in her patrol area on 4 July, and on 5 July sighted two Allied transports, but was unable to attack them. On 6 July, she fired a torpedo at a U.S. Navy destroyer, but it missed.

I-38 was on the surface in darkness in New Georgia Sound on 7 July 1943, when an Allied warship — probably the destroyer USS Waller at 08°00′S 158°05′E — surprised her, suddenly opening fire with her main gains and machine guns. I-38 crash-dived, and 10 minutes later the warship dropped a pattern of depth charges. I-38 descended to a depth of 265 feet (81 m) and finally broke contact with the warship after 90 minutes.

I-38 conducted her reconnaissance of Kula Gulf on 8 July, again after dark on 9 July, and a final time on 10 July 1943, when she received orders to return to Rabaul to resume her New Guinea supply runs. During her voyage to Rabaul, Allied aircraft attacked her repeatedly on 11 July 1943, forcing her to crash-dive each time, but she arrived safely at Rabaul on 12 July 1943.

=== New Guinea campaign July–August 1943 ===
On 17 July 1943, I-38 began her seventh New Guinea supply run from Rabaul, calling at Lae on 19 July and reaching Rabaul safely on 21 July despite coming under frequent attack by Allied bombers during her return voyage. She received a new Unpoto sled and cargo on 23 July and made her next round trip between Rabaul and New Guinea from 24 to 28 July 1943, discharging cargo at Lae on 26 July. On her ninth trip, conducted between 30 July and 3 August 1943, she lost five or six supply drums overboard while outbound from Rabaul, but she dropped off the rest of her cargo at Lae on 2 August 1943. On her tenth run, she departed Rabaul on 6 August 1943, called at Lae on 8 August, and crash-dived during her return trip after her lookouts sighted an Allied plane on 9 August, but returned safely to Rabaul on 10 August 1943.

=== New Guinea and Solomon Islands ===
After taking aboard cargo from Nagoya Maru on 12 August 1943, I-38 departed Rabaul on 14 August on her eleventh supply run and first to the Solomon Islands, carrying cargo to Kolombangara. She was only about 100 nautical miles (190 km; 120 mi) into her voyage that day when an Allied plane bombed and strafed her. On 15 August, six Allied aircraft attacked her in darkness and depth-charged her. She nonetheless unloaded her cargo at Kolombangara on 17 August. During her return voyage to Rabaul, her lookouts sighted six United States Army Air Forces B-24 Liberator bombers on 19 August and she crash-dived, but she made it back to Rabaul on 20 August 1943.

I-38 received a new Unpoto from Toyo Maru on 26 August 1943. For her twelfth supply trip, she returned to the New Guinea run, departing Rabaul on 28 August, calling at Lae on 30 August, and then making for Rabaul. En route, she had to crash-dive several times on 1 September 1943 when Allied aircraft sighted her, but she reached Rabaul that day.

After receiving another new Unpoto from Toyo Maru on 2 September, I-38 set out for her second trip to Kolombangara on 7 September 1943. While she was entering the Kolombangara Gulf, an Allied aircraft attacked her with a bomb but missed. Rather than unload her cargo at Kolombangara, she proceeded to Shortland Island, where she unloaded it on 12 September 1943 and got back underway for Rabaul. Only 30 minutes into her return voyage, her lookouts sighted an Allied plane, and she crash-dived. She was back on the surface again at 23:00 when an Allied plane surprised her — I-38′s crew reporting that the plane had switched off its engine to approach I-38 silently — and dropped three bombs, all of which missed. I-38 arrived at Rabaul on 13 September 1943.

=== New Guinea campaign, September–December 1943 ===
I-38 resumed her focus on supplying the New Guinea campaign. After taking aboard a cargo of provisions from Toyo Maru on 17 September 1943, she got underway with the commander of Submarine Division 15 embarked on her fourteenth supply run to deliver supplies at Finschhafen on the Huon Peninsula. She arrived off Finschhafen on 22 September but could not make contact with the Imperial Japanese Army garrison ashore and moved back out to sea. She again approached Finschhafen after dark on 23 September and again failed to contact the soldiers on the coast, and later that night she sighted an Allied convoy but was unable to attack it because of the cargo she still had aboard. She made a third and final attempt to contact the Japanese forces ashore on 24 September, and when that failed as well she received orders to patrol in the area until 27 September and then deliver her cargo at Sarmi, New Guinea. After dropping off half her cargo at Sarmi on 27 September, she returned to Rabaul on 28 September 1943.

On 3 October 1943, I-38 began her fifteenth supply run, departing Rabaul bound for Sarmi. While she was unloading at Sarmi on 5 October, an Allied plane attacked her, forcing her to submerge with two-thirds of her cargo still on her deck. She soon surfaced, completed unloading, and began her return trip to Rabaul, where she arrived on 8 October 1943.

While at Rabaul, I-38 began tests of the Unkato supply container — a 135-foot (41.1 m) submersible cargo container that could carry up to 377 tons of supplies, designed for a one-way trip in which the cargo′s recipients released, recovered, and unloaded it — on 10 October 1943. On 12 October 1943, the U.S. Army Air Forces Fifth Air Force and the Royal Australian Air Force combined to stage the largest Allied air raid of the Pacific War up to that time, with 349 aircraft based in New Guinea and Australia hitting Japanese airfields around Rabaul and shipping in Simpson Harbour at Rabaul. I-38 and the submarines I-36, I-176, I-177, Ro-105, and Ro-108 were in the harbor during the air raid and most of them submerged to avoid attack. I-38 concluded her unsuccessful Unkato tests on 13 October 1943.

On 15 October 1943, I-38 got underway from Rabaul on her sixteenth supply run. She arrived at Sarmi on 16 October, but had to suspend cargo-unloading operations when a severe thunderstorm struck. A U.S. Navy PT boat then attacked her, forced her to dive, and dropped four depth charges. I-38 returned to Sarmi after dark on 17 October and managed to discharge 80 percent of her cargo into two Daihatsus before departing for Rabaul. She was off Rabaul on 18 October when she sighted Allied aircraft heading for Rabaul and had to dive four times to avoid them, but she made it safely into Rabaul that day. At Rabaul, she conducted Unkato supply container tests again on 20 and 21 October 1943.

I-38 left Rabaul for her seventeenth supply run on the morning of 24 October 1943, submerging at around 09:15 when her lookouts spotted an Allied plane. She delivered her cargo at Sarmi on 25 October and had to crash-dive again because of an Allied plane on her return voyage to Rabaul, which she reached on 26 October 1943. On her eighteenth supply run, she departed Rabaul on 29 October 1943, submerged en route when she sighted an approaching formation of Allied aircraft, called at Sio, New Guinea, on 31 October, and headed back for Rabaul, where she arrived at around 13:00 on 2 November 1943. That afternoon, 145 aircraft of the U.S. Army Air Forces Fifth Air Force attacked Rabaul's airfields and harbor in support of the previous day′s landings at Cape Torokina on Bougainville, which began the Bougainville campaign. I-38 submerged in the harbor to avoid attack, and after she resurfaced she used her 140-millimeter (5.5 in) deck gun to scuttle a crippled ship in Simpson Harbour.

I-38 loaded cargo on 4 November 1943 and got underway for her nineteenth supply run on 5 November, towing an Unkato supply container. Allied aircraft attacked her that day, forcing her to submerge, and when she surfaced she abandoned the Unkato at sea. She unloaded her cargo at Sio on the evening of 7 November, embarked wounded and sick soldiers, and got back underway for Rabaul. She sighted Allied reconnaissance aircraft and submerged twice on 9 November 1943 during her return voyage, but arrived safely at Rabaul that day. She conducted more Unkato towing tests off Rabaul on 16 and 17 November 1943. She began her twentieth supply run on 18 November 1943, and saw action on 19 November, when a U.S. Navy PT boat attacked her, forcing her to crash-dive, and attacked her with four depth charges. Emerging from the encounter unscathed, she unloaded her cargo at Sarmi that evening and arrived at Rabaul on 20 November 1943. She made one more run before the end of November 1943, departing Rabaul on 23 November, delivering her cargo at Sio on 25 November, and surviving an encounter with an Allied bomber which dropped a bomb but missed her during her return trip on 26 November. She arrived at Rabaul on 27 November 1943.

Between 1 and 7 December 1943, I-38 conducted more Unkato towing tests and performed a speed trial. She resumed her supply activities on 7 December 1943, when she began her 22nd supply run, departing Rabaul with an Unpoto sled in tow and unloading her cargo and transferring the Unpoto to a Daihatsu at Sarmi on 9 December, and on 11 December she returned to Rabaul, where she conducted Unkato towing tests on 18 and 19 December. She got underway from Rabaul towing an Unkato on 19 December 1943 for her 23rd — and, as it turned out, last — supply run. Detached from the Southeast Submarine Force while at sea on 20 December, she delivered her cargo and the Unkato at Sio on 21 December before returning to Rabaul on 24 December 1943. She had delivered a total of 753 tons of cargo to New Guinea, Kolombangara, and Shortland Island during her 23 trips, and in March 1944 the commander-in-chief of the Combined Fleet, Admiral Mineichi Koga, decorated I-38′s commanding officer for his submarine′s supply achievements.

=== December 1943–March 1944 ===
I-38 left Rabaul on 26 December 1943 and set course for Truk, where she arrived on 29 December. At 15:00 on 30 December 1943, she got back underway, bound for Japan. By 1 January 1944 a member of Submarine Division 15 in Submarine Squadron 1 along with the submarines I-32, I-35, I-36, and I-41, I-38 arrived at Kure for repairs and overhaul on 7 January 1944.

While I-38 was at Kure, Submarine Squadron 1 was disbanded, and Submarine Division 15 — I-32, I-35, I-36, I-38, and I-41 — was attached directly to the 6th Fleet on 15 January 1944. After her overhaul was completed, I-38 departed Kure on 14 March 1944 to return to combat. On 19 March 1944, the submarine chaser Ch-20 and auxiliary submarine chaser Fuyo Maru escorted her into Truk Lagoon.

=== Second war patrol ===
I-38 remained at Truk until 30 March 1944, when she got underway for her second war patrol, assigned a patrol area in the Palau area. On 4 April 1944, she received orders to divert from her patrol to pick up the staff of the 9th Fleet at Wewak, New Guinea, and transfer it to Hollandia, New Guinea. She embarked a first group of 9th Fleet staff members at Wewak on 8 April, disembarked them at Hollandia on 10 April, brought aboard the remainder of the staff at Wewak on 12 April, and completed the transfer by discharging them at Hollandia as well on 14 April 1944. She called at Truk from 19 to 20 April 1944, then proceeded to Kure, where she arrived on 27 April 1944.

=== Operation Tatsumaki ===
In April 1944 I-38, the submarines I-36, I-41, and I-44, and the auxiliary submarine tender Tsukushi Maru began training in the Seto Inland Sea off Nasakejima for Operation Tatsumaki ("Tornado"), which called for the submarines to transport modified Type 4 Ka-Tsu amphibious tracked landing craft, each armed with two 450-millimeter (17.7 in) torpedoes, from Kure to Majuro in the Marshall Islands. After the submarines launched the Ka-Tsu vehicles, the operation called for the vehicles to proceed to shore, move overland across the atoll′s islands, then enter the water in the lagoon and attack Allied ships in the Majuro anchorage with torpedoes. In the later part of May 1944, Operation Tatsumaki was postponed pending the correction of defects found in the vehicles. The operation later was canceled entirely.

=== Third war patrol ===
I-38 set out from Kure on 18 May 1944 with a Yokosuka E14Y1 (Allied reporting name "Glen") floatplane embarked to begin her third war patrol, during which she was to patrol in the Pacific Ocean east of the Marshall Islands and use the floatplane to conduct a reconnaissance fight over Kwajalein. After she put to sea, she received orders changing her reconnaissance target to Majuro. On 13 June 1944, the commander-in-chief of the Combined Fleet, Admiral Soemu Toyoda, activated Operation A-Go for the defense of the Mariana Islands and ordered the commander-in-chief of the 6th Fleet, Vice Admiral Takeo Takagi, to redeploy all 6th Fleet submarines to the Marianas. When the Marianas campaign began with the U.S. landings on Saipan on 15 June 1944, I-38 and the submarines I-6, I-10, I-41, I-53, and Ro-47 received orders to remain on patrol off the Marianas while the rest of the 6th Fleet′s submarines withdrew from the area.

On 16 June 1944, I-38 was assigned to Submarine Unit A, tasked with patrolling in the Pacific east of the Marianas. She received orders on 28 June 1944 to evacuate the 6th Fleet′s staff from Saipan, but did not succeed, and Takagi canceled all rescue operations for his staff on 2 July 1944. Ordered on 7 July 1944 to return to Japan, I-38 arrived at Sasebo on 16 July 1944 to undergo a refit that included applying an anti-radar coating to her.

=== Fourth war patrol ===
Toyoda activated Operation Shō-Gō 1 for the defense of the Philippine Islands on 13 October 1944. With her refit complete, I-38 was assigned to Submarine Unit B on 18 October 1944, and on 19 October 1944 got underway from Kure for her fourth war patrol, assigned a patrol area with I-41 in the Philippine Sea east of the Philippines. The Battle of Leyte began with the U.S. landings on Leyte on 20 October 1944, and the Japanese naval reaction to the landings resulted in the Battle of Leyte Gulf of 23–26 October 1944. I-38 arrived in her patrol area east of Leyte and Samar on 25 October 1944 with the Battle of Leyte Gulf raging, but saw no action in the battle.

On 5 November 1944, I-38 received orders to conduct a reconnaissance of Ngulu Atoll in the Caroline Islands to determine if Allied ships were anchoring there, information that the Japanese needed to plan future attacks by piloted kaiten suicide attack torpedoes against Allied anchorages. Her reconnaissance was planned for 11 November 1944. While en route to Ngulu Atoll, she transmitted a report that she had sighted an Allied task force in the Philippine Sea east of Luzon on 7 November 1944. The Japanese never heard from her again.

=== Loss ===
On 12 November 1944, the destroyer USS Nicholas — which along with the destroyer USS Taylor was escorting the light cruiser USS St. Louis on a voyage from Ulithi Atoll to Kossol Roads at Palau — picked up a surface contact on radar east of Palau at a range of 22,000 yards (20,100 m) at 20:03. Nicholas closed the range and opened radar-directed gunfire with her 5-inch (127 mm) guns, but the contact disappeared, indicating it was a submarine that had submerged. At around 22:30, Nicholas acquired sonar contact on a submerged submarine and dropped a pattern of 18 depth charges. She subsequently lost contact with the submarine, but at 00:30 on 13 November 1944 she regained it and approached for an attack. When her sonar operator reported that the submarine had made a last-minute hard turn to starboard, Nicholas also turned hard to starboard, backing with her starboard engine as she did. The maneuver put her almost on top of the submarine, and she dropped a pattern of depth charges. A few minutes after the last depth charge detonated, a huge underwater explosion occurred. It marked the sinking of a Japanese submarine at 08°04′N 138°03′E. After sunrise on 13 November, debris and human remains were sighted floating in the area.

I-38 did not send a scheduled message to the 6th Fleet on 13 November 1944, and the submarine Nicholas sank early that morning probably was her. On 6 December 1944, the Imperial Japanese Navy declared I-38 to be presumed lost off the Palau Islands along with all 110 men on board. She was stricken from the Navy list on 10 March 1945.

== Bibliography ==
- Hackett, Bob & Kingsepp, Sander. IJN Submarine I-38: Tabular Record of Movement. Retrieved on September 4, 2020.
- Milanovich, Kathrin (2021). "The IJN Submarines of the I 15 Class". In Jordan, John (ed.). Warship 2021. Oxford, UK: Osprey Publishing. pp. 29–43. ISBN 978-1-4728-4779-9.
