= Type 4 Ka-Tsu =

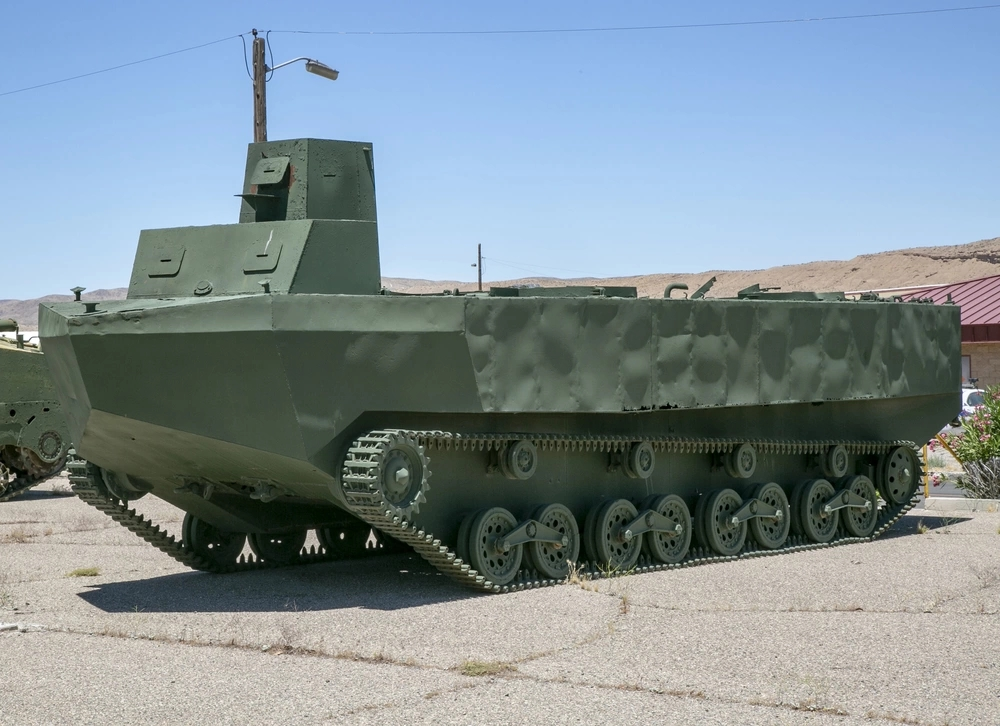
- A Ka-Tsu on display
- Type: Amphibious armored personnel carrier
- Place of origin: Empire of Japan

Production history
- Designed: 1942–1943
- No. built: 49

Specifications
- Mass: 16 tons
- Length: 11 m
- Width: 4 m
- Height: 2.25 m
- Crew: 5
- Armor: 10 mm
- Main armament: 2x torpedoes
- Secondary armament: 2x 13 mm machine guns
- Engine: gasoline (petrol) in a water-tight pressure box 62 HP
- Power/weight: 3 HP/1 ton
- Suspension: -
- Operational range: -
- Maximum speed: (sea) 5 knots

The special Type 4 Launch Ka-Tsu (特四式内火艇 カツ, toku-yon-shiki uchibitei Ka-Tsu) was a Japanese amphibious landing craft of World War II. The first prototype was completed in late 1943 and trials were conducted off Kure in March 1944.

== History ==
Japan's combat experience in the Solomon Islands in 1942, which revealed the difficulty of resupplying Japanese forces in such situations, prompted the IJN to commence an amphibious tractor program in 1943, as the Ka-Tsu.

== Design ==
The Ka-Tsu's primary purpose was to transport cargo and/or troops ashore. It had light armored shielding with a maximum of 10 mm. Its engine compartment and electric final drives were hermetically sealed, as it was intended to be launched from a submarine. The twin drive propeller shafts were designed to retract "into their ducts" once the vehicle reached the beach.

The first prototype was completed in late 1943 and trials were conducted off Kure in March 1944. By the time development had been completed, it was proposed that the Ka-Tsu be used to attack US battleships anchored in atolls (such as Ulithi), which could not readily be attacked using conventional means. It was proposed that a Ka-Tsu armed with a pair of naval Type 93 torpedoes be dropped off by submarine away from the atoll, propel itself to the outer reef using its tracks, and then enter the lagoon on the inside of the reef. Tests were successfully carried out with a modified Ka-Tsu carrying two torpedoes on the submarine deck. A total of 49 units were produced.

=== Operation Tatsumaki ===
In May 1944, the submarines I-36, I-38, I-41, I-44 and I-53 and the auxiliary submarine tender Tsukushi Maru began training in the Seto Inland Sea off Nasakejima for Operation Tatsumaki ("Tornado"), which called for the submarines to transport modified Ka-Tsu's, each armed with two torpedoes, from Kure to Majuro. After the submarines launched the Ka-Tsu's, the operation called for the tracked vehicles to proceed to shore, moving overland across the atoll's, then enter the water of the lagoon and attack Allied ships with the torpedoes. The war ended before any such mission could be mounted and the Ka-Tsu deployed in combat.

== Gallery ==
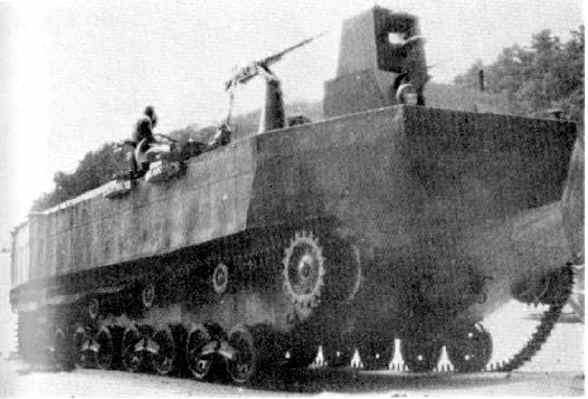
Type 4 Ka-Tsu with machine guns mounted

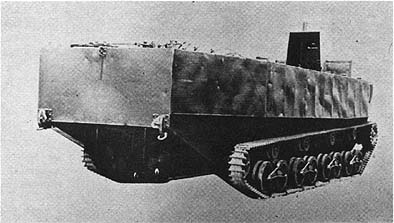
Rear-side angle view of Type 4 Ka-Tsu

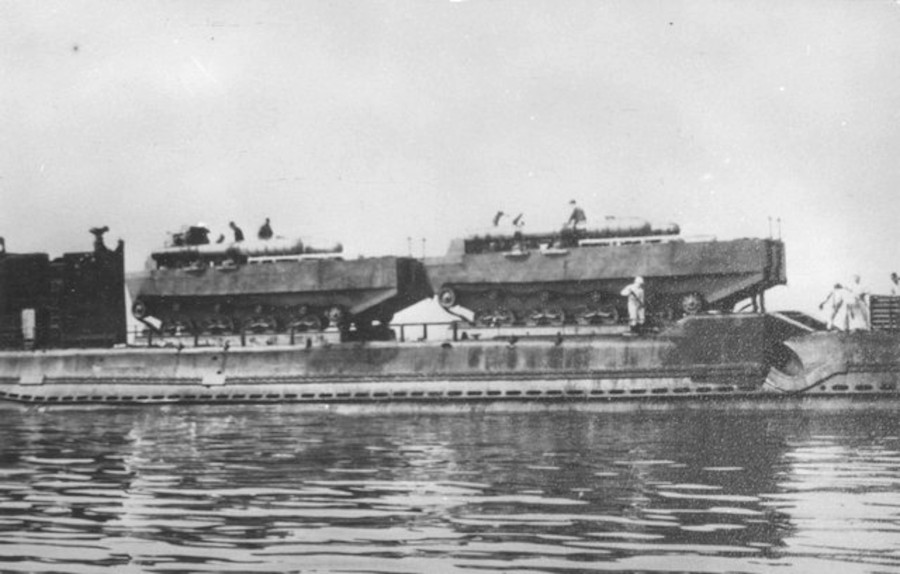
Two Type 4 Ka-Tsu with torpedoes aboard the Japanese submarine I-41 off Kure, May 1944

== See also ==
- Blockade Runner
- Type 3 submergence transport vehicle
- Ha-101 class submarine
