= Maness =

Maness may refer to:

- Maness, Virginia, a community in Lee County
- Maness (surname)
