= Joseph C. Eversole =

American lawyer, merchant, and clan leader (1852–1888)

Joseph Castle Eversole (July 26, 1852 – April 15, 1888) was an American lawyer and merchant. He was the leader of the Eversole side of the French-Eversole Feud.

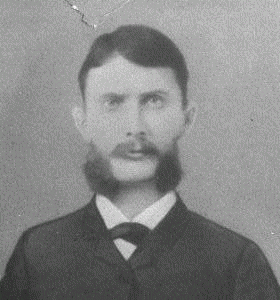
Joseph Castle Eversole about 1884

== Early life ==
Eversole was born on July 26, 1852 to Cavalry (14th Kentucky) Major John C. Eversole (1828–1864) and Nancy Ann Duff (1828–1900). He was one of nine known children. The Eversole, Duff, Combs, and Cornett families were early settlers of what became Hazard, Perry County, Kentucky.

Eversole owned a general store in Hazard and is listed as holding various elected positions in the area. He married Susan Combs (1855–1947) on May 31, 1871, and had seven children, of which five lived to adulthood.

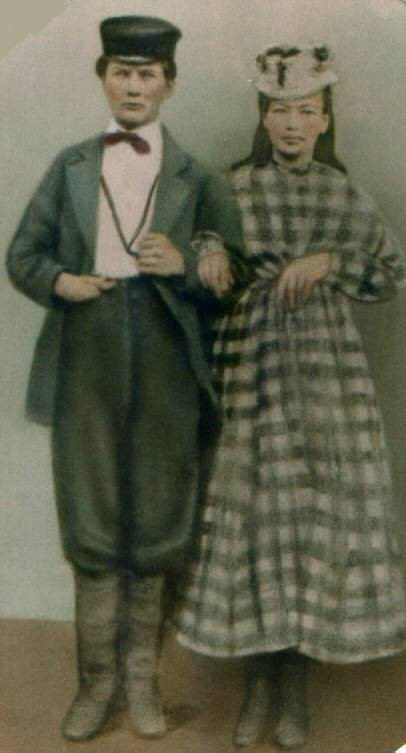
Joseph C. (left) and Susan (Combs) (right) Eversole on their wedding day

Their children were:

- William C. Eversole (1873–1943)
- John Boyd Eversole (1875–1910)
- Lillie C. Eversole (1877–1878)
- Martha Alice Eversole (1878–1879)
- Dr. Chester Arthur Eversole (1881–1967), named after US President Chester A. Arthur
- Clara Belle Eversole (1883–1967), spouse of William Manon Cornett
- Harry Clay Eversole (1885–1939), sometimes referred to as 'One Arm Harry'

Eversole attended the 1884 Republican National Convention, held in June 1884, as one of the delegates from the 10th district of Kentucky.

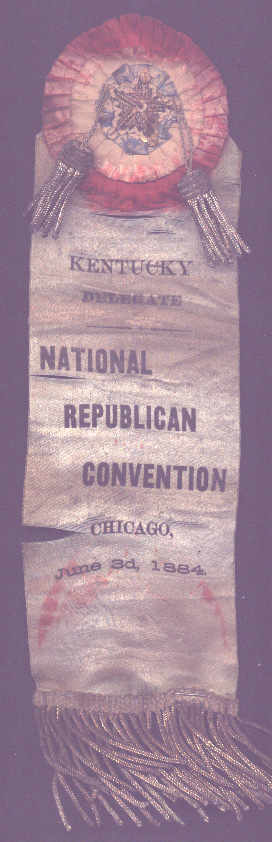
1884 Delegate badge of Joseh C. Eversole

== Assassination ==
Eversole was killed on April 15, 1888, along with a member of the Combs family. Several accounts of Eversole's assassination were written in the years after his death. One such account, a school letter written by student Malta Elle Davidson in 1891, read in part:

Alice Combs was sweeping her yard about 4 miles north of Hazard.. Her son Nickolas Combs had gone to Hyden [Kentucky] from Hazard [Kentucky]. Alice's brother Josiah H. Combs was judge and Joseph Eversole, Nick's best friend, were going with him to attend court, the county seat of Leslie County, Kentucky. Nick was riding her [Alice Combs] horse..... About 5 miles (8.0 km) from the house she found Nick lying by the side of the road. He had been shot several times and his eyes were shot out. Nick was still alive and lived for a few minutes after she found him. Joe Eversole had been shot about the same number of times of Nick. Joe Eversole was dead - Nick's mouth was full of blood and couldn't talk to his mother. Nick and his friend Joe Eversole were buried together in the same coffin and the same grave.

The individual arrested and hanged for the murder was known as 'Bad Tom' Smith. Another man, Joe Adkins, was also implicated in Eversole's murder, and was later convicted for the 1894 assassination of Judge Josiah H. Combs. 'Bad Tom' said that the murders were committed on orders from the leader of the French faction, Benjamin Fulton French. Media of the time recorded Smith's confession in detail. The June 28, 1895 Courier-Journal (Louisville, Kentucky) reported Mr. Smith saying:

Then he helped kill Joe Eversole and Nick Combs. He said Joe Adkins shot first with a shotgun and he shot at them as they fell off their horses and then robbed Eversole's body of $30.

A number of books claim that most people believed that Benjamin Fulton French, Eversole's counterpart in the Eversole-French Feud, was ultimately responsible for the murders of Joseph C. Eversole as well as his father-in-law, Josiah Henry Combs.

== Aftermath ==
In 1913, French coincidentally ran into Joe Eversole's widow, Susan Combs Eversole, in the lobby of a hotel in Elkatawa, Kentucky (near Jackson, Kentucky). With Mrs. Eversole was her youngest son, Harry C. Eversole, then 28 years old. When French spoke to Mrs. Eversole, Harry pulled out a revolver and shot French in the spleen. Harry C. Eversole was fined $75 for disturbing the peace; the fine was paid by his mother.

Although French initially recovered from his wounds, he died from complications of the wound in 1915, a little over a year after the shooting, and was buried at the Winchester Cemetery in Clark County. While French never went to prison for the crime of orchestrating the Eversole clan murders, Harry Eversole was never tried for Fulton French's murder.

== Media articles ==
The French-Eversole Feud was the subject of much newspaper coverage, through which the public followed the twists and turns of the various trials, battles, indictments, convictions, re-trials, and deaths of the participants. This is a list of the newspapers that ran articles about the feud, in order of publication:

First Notice of Feud

- June 30, 1886 Louisville Courier-Journal, Louisville, Ky Page 1
- July 24, 1886 St. Louis Post Dispatch, St. Louis, Missouri Page 8
- July 25, 1886 Topeka Daily Capital, Topeka Kansas, Page 1
- August 24, 1886 The Republic, Columbus, Indiana, Page 1
- August 25, 1886 Wilkes-Barre Record, Wilkes-Barre, PA, page 1
- September 3, 1886 The Hickman Courier, Hickman, Ky, Page 1
- November 16, 1886 St. Paul Globe, St. Paul, Minnesota, Page 1

The Peace Treaty

- November 22, 1886 Newton Daily Republican, Newton, Kansas, Page 2
- November 25, 1886 Scott Weekly Monitor, Scott, Kansas, Page 6
- November 27, 1886 Phillipsburg Herald, Phillipsburg, Kansas, Page 1
- December 2, 1886 Phillipsburg Herald, Phillipsburg, Kansas, Page 1
- December 2, 1886 Greensboro North State, Greensboro, NC, Page 1

Assassination of Joseph C. Eversole

- April 17, 1888 Louisville Courier-Journal, Louisville, Ky, Page 1
- November 14, 1888 Decatur Herald, Decatur, Illinois, Page 1
- November 14, 1888 Ottawa Daily Republic, Ottawa, Kansas, page 1
- December 2, 1888 St. Louis Post Dispatch, St. Louis, Missouri, Page 6
- December 21, 1888 Columbus Journal, Columbus, Nebraska, Page 2
- December 21, 1888 Kingston Daily Freeman, Kingston, NY, Page 2
- December 23, 1888 Democrat and Chronicle, Rochester, NY, Page 1
- December 23, 1888 Galveston Daily News, Galveston, Texas, Page 3
- December 23, 1888 St. Paul Globe, St. Paul, Minnesota, page 22
- December 23, 1888 Detroit Free Press, Detroit, Michigan, page 3
- December 24, 1888 Ottawa Daily Republic, Ottawa, Kansas, Page 2
- December 27, 1888 Worthington Advance, Worthington, Minnesota, Page 2
- January 28, 1889 St. Louis Post Dispatch, St. Louis, Missouri, page 5

Battle of Hazard

- November 14, 1889 Salina Daily Republican, Salina, Kansas, Page 1
- November 15, 1889 Lawrence Daily Journal, Lawrence, Kansas, Page 1
- November 15, 1889 Times Picayune, New Orleans, Louisiana, Page 2
- November 15, 1889 The Cincinnati Enquirer, Cincinnati, Ohio, Page 1
- November 15, 1889 Detroit Free Press, Detroit, Michigan, Page 2
- November 15, 1889 Arkansas City Daily Traveler, Arkansas City, Kansas, Page 8
- November 15, 1889 Pittsburgh Daily Post, Pittsburgh, PA, Page 6
- November 16, 1889 Scranton Republican, Scranton, PA, Page 1
- November 16, 1889 The Times, Philadelphia, PA, Page 4
- November 23, 1889 Ohio Democrat, Logan, Ohio, Page 2
- December 21, 1889 People's Press, Winston-Salem, NC, Page 3

Continuing Bloodshed

- August 10, 1890 St. Louis Post Dispatch, St. Louis, Missouri, Page 3
- August 17, 1890 Independent Record, Helena, Montana, Page 9
- August 29, 1890 The Tennessean, Nashville, TN, Page 1
- August 29, 1890 Daily Arkansas Gazette, Little Rock, Arkansas, page 1
- August 29, 1890 Indianapolis News, Indianapolis, Indiana, Page 1
- August 30, 1890 Ironwood Times, Ironwood, Michigan, Page 1
- September 1, 1890 Independent Record, Helena, Montana, Page 1
- September 1, 1890 The Tennessean, Nashville, Tn, Page 1
- September 1, 1890 Sandusky Register, Sandusky, Ohio, Page 1
- September 2, 1890 Cincinnati Enquirer, Cincinnati, Ohio, Page 1
- September 2, 1890 Detroit Free Press, Detroit, Michigan, Page 4
- September 3, 1890 Somerset Herald, Somerset, PA, page 2
- September 3, 1890 The Republic, Columbus, Indiana, Page 1
- September 4, 1890 The Onaga Herald, Onaga, Kansas, Page 1
- September 7, 1890 Cincinnati Enquirer, Cincinnati, Ohio, Page 17
- September 8, 1890 The World, New York City, New York, Page 11
- September 11, 1890 The Index, Hermitage, Missouri, Page 1
- September 12, 1890 Big Stone Gap Post, Big Stone Gap, VA, Page 3
- September 19, 1890 Cincinnati Enquirer, Cincinnati, Ohio, Page 1
- September 20, 1890 The Lima News, Lima, Ohio, Page 1
- September 27, 1890 Chicago Daily Tribune, Chicago, Illinois, Page 4

Bad Tom Smith given Bail

- November 24, 1890 McPherson Daily Republican, McPherson, Kansas, Page 4

Continuing Bloodshed

- May 5, 1891 Scott Daily Monitor, Scott, Kansas, Page 1
- May 8, 1891 Lebanon Daily News, Lebanon, PA, Page 1
- February 28, 1892 St. Paul Globe, St. Paul, Minnesota, Page 16
- November 7, 1892 San Francisco Call, San Francisco, CA, page 16

False reports that Josiah Combs elderly wife was murdered

- May 21, 1893 Davenport Democrat and Leader, Davenport, Iowa, Page 9
- May 25, 1893 Warren Sheaf, Warren, Minnesota, Page 3
- May 25, 1893 Big Stone Gap Post, Big Stone Gap, VA, Page 3
- June 1, 1893 Der Fortshritt, New Ulm, Minnesota, Page 2
- June 1, 1893 Princeton Union, Princeton, Minnesota, Page 2

Indictments, Trials and Acquittals

- October 10, 1893 Louisville Courier-Journal, Louisville, KY, Page 4
- December 15, 1893 Louisville Courier-Journal, Louisville, KY, Page 5

Judge Josiah Combs Targeted and killed

- October 18, 1894 Atchison Daily Champion, Atchison, Kansas, Page 1
- October 27, 1894 Perrysburg Journal, Perrysburg, Ohio, Page 2
- December 12, 1894 New York Times, New York, New York, Page 1
- December 12, 1894 Scranton Republican, Scranton, PA, page 2

More Trials, More indictments

- January 24, 1895 Springfield Leader, Springfield, Missouri, Page 1
- April 14, 1895 St. Louis Post Dispatch, St. Louis, Missouri, Page 21
- April 14, 1895 Louisville Courier-Journal, Louisville, KY, Page 15
- April 25, 1895 Louisville Courier-Journal, Louisville, KY Page 1
- June 15, 1895 Alexandria Gazette, Alexandria, Virginia, Page 2

Bad Tom Smith Confesses

- June 29, 1895 Daily Democrat, Huntington, Indiana, Page 1
- June 29, 1895 Cincinnati Enquirer, Cincinnati, Ohio, Page 1 and 5
- December 9, 1895 Cincinnati Enquirer, Cincinnati, Ohio, Page 1

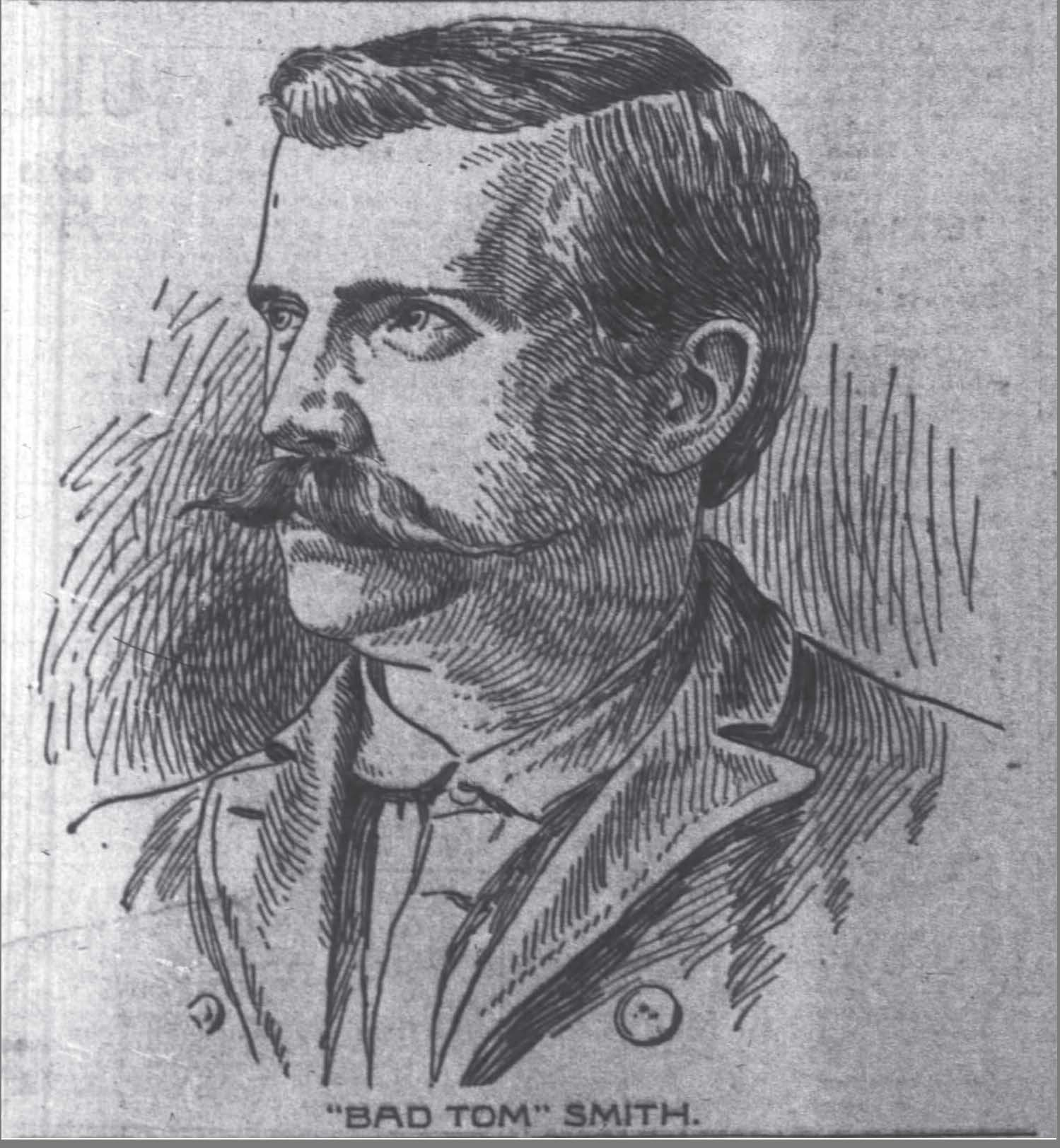
'Bad Tom' Smith

- December 16, 1895 Louisville Courier-Journal, Louisville, KY, Page 1
- December 17, 1895 Reading Times, Reading, PA, Page 1
- July 7, 1899 The Evening Times, Washington, DC, Page 3
- June 6, 1903 The Pittsburgh Press, Pittsburgh, PA, Page 40

Fulton French Charged with Murder over Marcum case

- March 4, 1904 Mountain Advocate, Barbourville, KY, Page 1
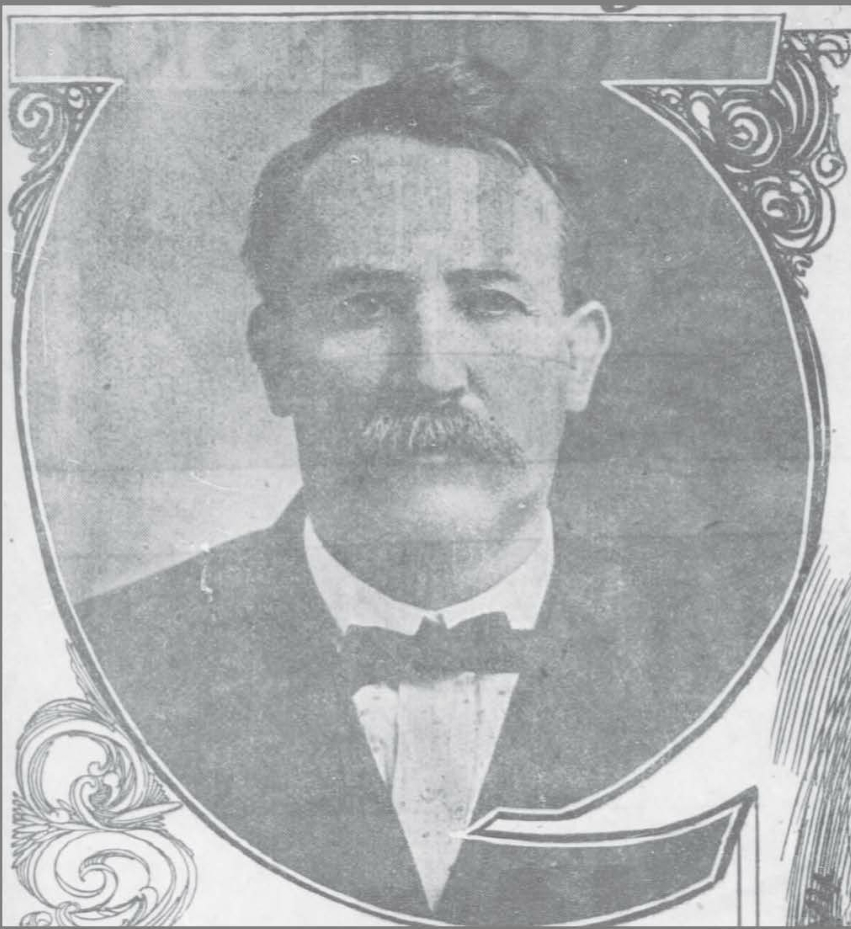
  B. Fulton French (leader of the French faction in the French-Eversole War)
- March 25, 1904 Hartford Republican, Hartford, KY, Page 2
- August 17, 1906 Louisville Courier-Journal, Louisville, KY, Page 1
- March 17, 1907 Cincinnati Enquirer, Cincinnati, Ohio, Page 27
- March 24, 1907 Washington Times, Washington, DC, Page 44
- June 17, 1907 Janesville Daily Gazette, Janesville, Wisconsin, Page 1
- June 17, 1907 Kansas City Globe, Kansas City, Kansas, Page 1
- June 17, 1907 Goldsboro Daily Argus, Goldsboro, NC, Page 1
- November 30, 1907 The Pantagraph, Bloomington, Illinois, Page 1
- December 10, 1907 Louisville Courier-Journal, Louisville, KY, Page 1
- December 28, 1907 Paducah Evening Sun, Paducah, KY, Page 1
- November 20, 1908 New York Times, New York, New York, Page 2
- December 4, 1908 Hartford Republican, Hartford, Kentucky, Page 6

Fulton French and Mrs. Eversole meet

- July 31, 1910 Louisville Courier-Journal, Louisville, KY, Page 12

Fulton French dies

- January 6, 1915 Louisville Courier-Journal, Louisville, KY, Page 1
- January 7, 1915 Louisville Courier-Journal, Louisville, KY, Page 4
- January 7, 1915 Public Ledger, Maysville, KY, Page 4
