= Maness (surname) =

Maness is an American surname of Dutch origin. Germanic settlers from Holland settled the low-lying coastal areas of the Carolinas in the 17th and 18th centuries, but did not own slaves. Notable people with the surname include:

- Jack Maness, American singer-songwriter, guitarist, and keyboardist
- Ryan Maness, American cybersecurity expert and co-author
- Seth Maness (born 1988), American baseball pitcher
- Arch Glass Mainous, American Banker and Businessman (1899-1990)

Many genealogy researchers point to the Maness surname being of Scottish origin. Maness is a sept of Clan Gunn, one of the oldest Scottish clans located in northeastern Scotland in the area of Caithness, Sutherland and possibly the Orkney Islands. Scottish origin is further evidenced by the first Maness to settle in North America, William Maness, who arrived in Virginia from Scotland in or around 1715. He returned to Scotland for several years before finally returning to the colonies and settling in Moore County, North Carolina. According to DNA testing most Maness's in the USA are descendants of William Maness.

DNA testing site, FTDNA, https://www.familytreedna.com/, has a dedicated MANESS (and related spellings) testing site here: https://www.familytreedna.com/groups/maness/dna-results.

A test of Individuals who have tested is here: https://www.familytreedna.com/public/Maness?iframe=ydna-results-overview

Most Maness (and related spellings) are in 'Group 1' of the FTDNA group test. Those who are R-BY32729 (or around it) generally show descent from William Maness of Moore County, NC and have a terminal SNP of R-BY32729 (if they have had the detailed Y-DNA test). Others who have slightly different terminal SNP's are also descended from William Maness (or unknown brothers or Uncles). About 65 Maness genealogically related men have been tested.

All of Group 1 on the FTDNA Maness Project site are part of the R-M269 group. Maness males who haven't been fully tested tend to show up as R-M269.

R-M269's Maness' sub y-Haplogroup's positive STR's are typically as follows in descending order (meaning under R-M269 in descending order and 'further out on the branch').

R-M269

*R-L23
 *R-L51
  *R-P310
   *R-P312
    *R-Z195
     *R-Z274
      *R-Z209 (2 Maness via R-S21184 is below here)
       *R-S21184 (1 Maness male)
        *R-FGC13557
         *R-A7066 (1 Maness male)
          *R-BY32723 (1 Maness male)
           *R-BY32730
            *R-BY32729 (21 Maness males)
             *R-FTG21915 (2 Maness Males)
             *R-FTD21517 (2 Maness Males)

Of about 65 tested as of 1-18-2025, 21 have R-BY32729, two have R-FTG32915, two R-FT105954, two R-FTD21517, two R-S21184. 4 Maness males have a terminal SNP below R-BY32729 indicating that an updated terminal SNP will supplant R-BY32729 below it as genetic information is refined.

Over the centuries, Maness have used a variety of spellings to either write their names or to have them written into Court records. Here are some examples of spellings used:

- Maness
- Mainous (most descended from 2 men who moved from Virginia to Kentucky about 1850)
- Manis
- Manes
- Mainus
- Manes
- Manus
- Maynous
