= Eversole (surname) =

Eversole is a surname of Swiss German origin, a variation of Ebersole.

- Archie Eversole (1984–2022), American rapper
- Bill Eversole (born 1963), American racing driver
- John T. Eversole (1915–1942), United States Navy officer
- Joseph C. Eversole (1852–1888), American lawyer, merchant, and clan leader

== See also ==
- Eversole (disambiguation)
- Ebersol
- Ebersole
- Ebersold
