= Ebersold =

Ebersold is a German surname. Notable people with the surname include:

- Auguste Ebersold (born 1860), French mechanic, printer, and anarchist
- Frederick Ebersold (1841–1900), American law enforcement officer
- Tom Ebersold (1943–1976), American artist

== See also ==
- Ebersol
- Ebersole
- Eversole (surname)
