= Eversole =

Eversole may refer to:

- Charles Eversole House, listed on the NRHP in Hunterdon County, New Jersey
- Eversole, Kentucky
- Eversole (surname), a list of people with the name
- USS Eversole (DE-404), a US Navy WWII destroyer escort
- USS Eversole (DD-789), a US Navy Gearing-class destroyer

== See also ==
- Ebersole
