= Josiah Henry Combs =

American judge

Josiah Henry Combs was a lawyer and judge in Perry County, Kentucky. He was one of the central players involved in the French–Eversole Feud from 1887 to 1894 in Perry County. Combs was assassinated on September 23, 1894, in Hazard, the county seat.

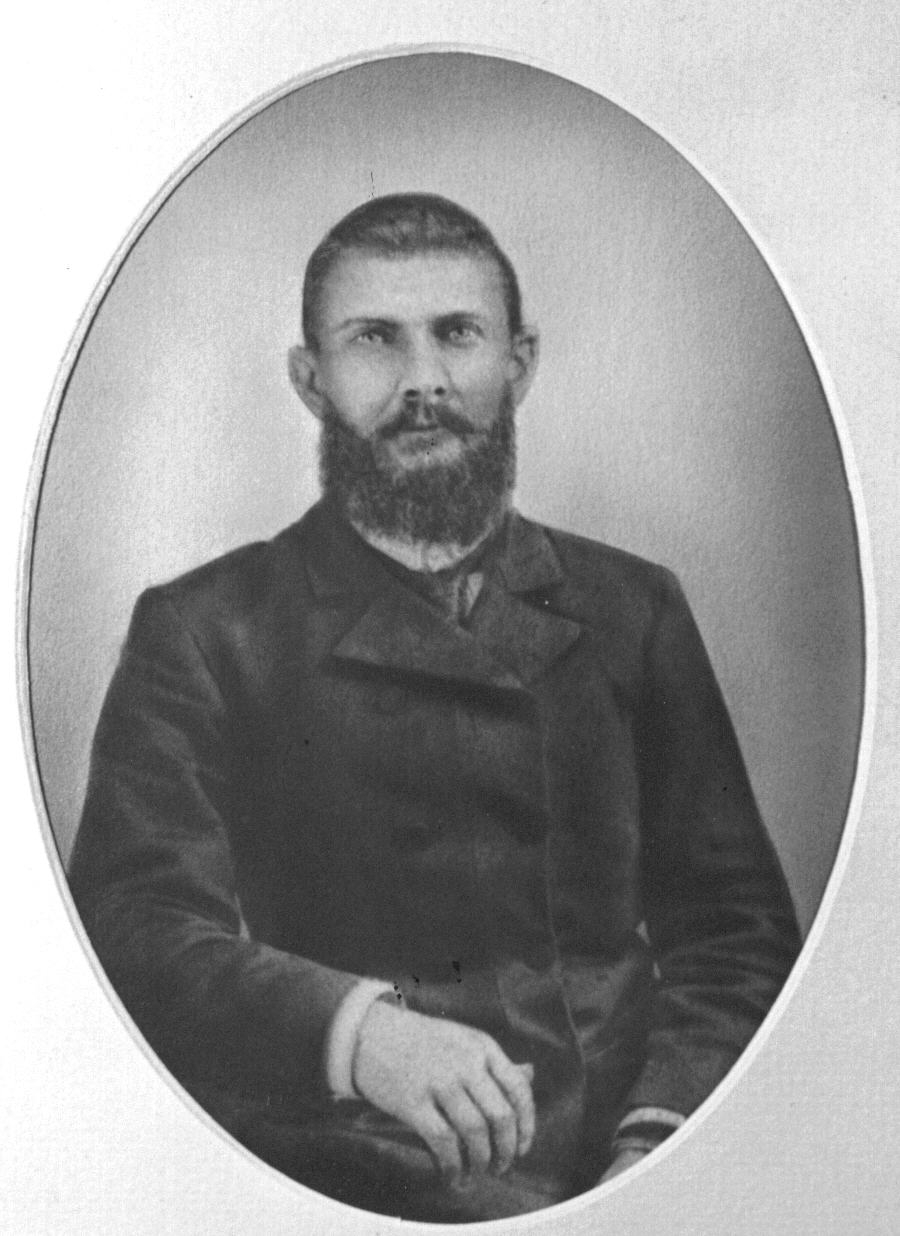
Judge Josiah H. Combs of Hazard, Perry County, Kentucky (French-Eversole War)

== Early life ==
Josiah was born on November 25, 1832, to Jesse Combs (1798–1874) and Mary 'Polly' (Boling) Combs (1801–1875) of Hazard, Perry County, Kentucky. His father, Jesse Combs, was the Clerk of Perry County, Kentucky. He is the grandson of Elijah Combs (1770–1855) the founder of Hazard and Perry County, Kentucky.

Josiah married Elizabeth 'Polly' Ann Mattingly on July 9, 1853, in Hazard.

Combs and his wife had at least six children:

- William Jesse Combs (1853–1938)
- Nancy Combs
- Susan Combs (1855–1947) married politician Joseph C. Eversole
- Sarah Combs (1857–1919) married French supporter Elijah Morgan
- Martha Combs (1859–1886) married Ira Jesse Davidson (2nd leader of the Eversole faction)
- Mary Ellen Combs (1860–1900)

== Involvement in the French–Eversole Feud ==
Numerous books and media accounts have been recorded about the French-Eversole Feud and the various battles between supporters of Joseph C. Eversole and Benjamin Fulton French.

Josiah Combs was the father-in-law of Joseph C. Eversole. He was also an Officer of the Court and had an obligation to the law.

On February 15, 1887, a fight broke out in Hazard, Kentucky between Joe Eversole and an itinerant mountain preacher, William 'Bill' Gambill, a French supporter. After a short exchange and a physical altercation, Gambriel was fired upon by Eversole supporters. Eventually, Gambriel was wounded by the Eversole men. As Gambriel was wounded, Joe Eversole shot him in the head killing him instantly. French supporters insisted that Joe Eversole be arrested. Eversole forces said that Gambriel pulled a gun and that the shooting was self-defense. Combs refused to issue a warrant and thereby became a partisan for the Eversole side of the feud.

Eventually, Combs and his family were forced to leave Hazard for safety reasons.

Governor Simon B. Buckner sent troops into Hazard several times. In 1889 the 'Battle of Hazard' occurred and Hazard was occupied.

After four years of tranquility, Combs decided to return to Hazard over the objections of his friends. Not long after he arrived a group of French supporters hiding in a corn field, opened fire on Combs, killing him at the door to his home. Eventually the man who fired the shot, Joseph Adkins was indicted, tried, and convicted. His accomplices, including Benjamin Fulton French were indicted but not convicted.

The 1917 book "Famous Kentucky Feuds and Tragedies" by Chas. G. Mutzenbery provided this account (roughly 13 years after Judge Combs' assassination):

- The Murder was committed in broad-open daylight, in plain view of many townspeople and also from ambush.
- At the moment the fatal shot was fired, the old man was engaged with several of his friends and neighbors in common place conversation.
- Within a few feet of the group of men stood a fence enclosing a lot planted with corn, which together with the thick and tall growth of weeks and bushes, offered the assassins admirable opportunity to approach their victim to within a very few feet without danger of discovery.
- No one noticed the slight rustling of the corn blades. Not one saw the hand that parted them skillfully to make way for the gun which accomplished its deadly work. There was a puff of smoke, a loud report and Judge Combs reeled. Suddenly he straightened himself up, stood apparently undecided for a moment then walked across the street toward home. At its threshold he sank to the ground and expired without a groan.
- The Murderers had evidently been determined to guard against any possible blunders which had on former occasions, saved the old man's life. From the moment the shot was fired up to the time the old man fell dead, the murderous gun continually covered him, ready for instant service should it appear that the first shot had not been fatal.
- After the victim had fallen to the ground, the principal assassins deliberately walked to the rear of the lot. Here he was joined by one of his confederates. A third had already opened fire and continued a fusillade from across the river for the evident purpose of pretending the presence of a larger force and thus by intimidation to prevent pursuit.
- The three confederates then proceeded calmly down the river. Their retreat was deliberate. At no time did them exhibit the slightest apprehension of danger or fear of pursuers.

== Conviction and trial of the accused ==
In this same 1917 book was a summary of the conviction and trial of the accused though in the end, no one was really punished by the courts. Joe Adkins was convicted and was supposed to serve life but was released under mysterious circumstances.

- Several of the eyewitnesses of the tragedy and several members of the pursuing posse had recognized Joe Adkins, Jesse Fields and one Boon Frazier as the fugitives.
- Joe Adkins was the man who had fired the fatal shot which took the life of the old man Combs.
- The three parties mentioned were in due time indicted. Adkins and Fields were arrested. Frazier was never caught.
- The case against Adkins and Fields were transferred to another district in Kentucky for trial. The best legal talent of the state participated in the famous trial. Honorable WCP Breckenridge a lawyer and orate of national fame had been retained as counsel for the defense.
- Fields and Adkins had been French men all through the feud, in fact, had been among his most trusted lieutenants since its commencement. Rumor therefore quickly associated the name of French with the murder of Judge Combs. French stoutly denied any complicity in this affair. Then, like a thunderbolt from a clear sky, came the startling intelligence that Tom Smith, another French warrior, had given out a confession which seriously compromised French.
- Smith was then under sentence of death, at Jackson, Breathitt County, for the murder of Dr. John E. Rader. As is usual with doomed felons, he became converted and sought to wash his sin stained soul whiter than snow by a confession. It set forth that he had been present at the home of Jesse Fields on Buckhorn Creek, Breathitt County, at the time when French, Adkins and Fields discussed and perfected plans for the assassination of Judge Combs; that he, Smith, would have assisted in the dastardly murder but for a wound which he had a short time before received in a pistol duel with Town Marshal Mann on the streets of Jackson.
- This confession resulted in French also being indicted.
- The confession itself was of no importance from a legal standpoint. It was however materially assisted and strengthened the prosecution by uncovering certain circumstances of which it might otherwise have remained in ignorance. The friends of the murdered judge pointed out with emphasis and logic that Smith had always been a French Confederate, had fought for him and taken life for him; that he had told the truth about his participation in the murders of Joe Eversole, Nick Combs, Shade Combs, Robin Cornett, McKnight and Doctor Rader. Was there any reason, they asked, why Smith should have lied in regard to French's complicity in the murder of Judge Combs, yet had told the truth concerning all other things.
- Why, they argued, should Smith desire the ruin of his friend, his companion in arms, his chieftain, and accomplish it by false statements, when the truth would save him?
- French was indicted, tried and acquitted.
- On the first trial of Adkins and Fields both received life sentences. The cases were taken to the Court of Appeals and there, in an exhaustive opinion reversed. The second trials resulted in a life sentence for Adkins and the acquittal of Jesse Fields. Adkins however, had been a free man again, lo-these many years. A life sentence in Kentucky is not what it seems.
- Thus ends the last act of the bloody drama – the assassination of Judge Combs. He was murdered because he had espoused the cause of Joe Eversole at the breaking out of the war.

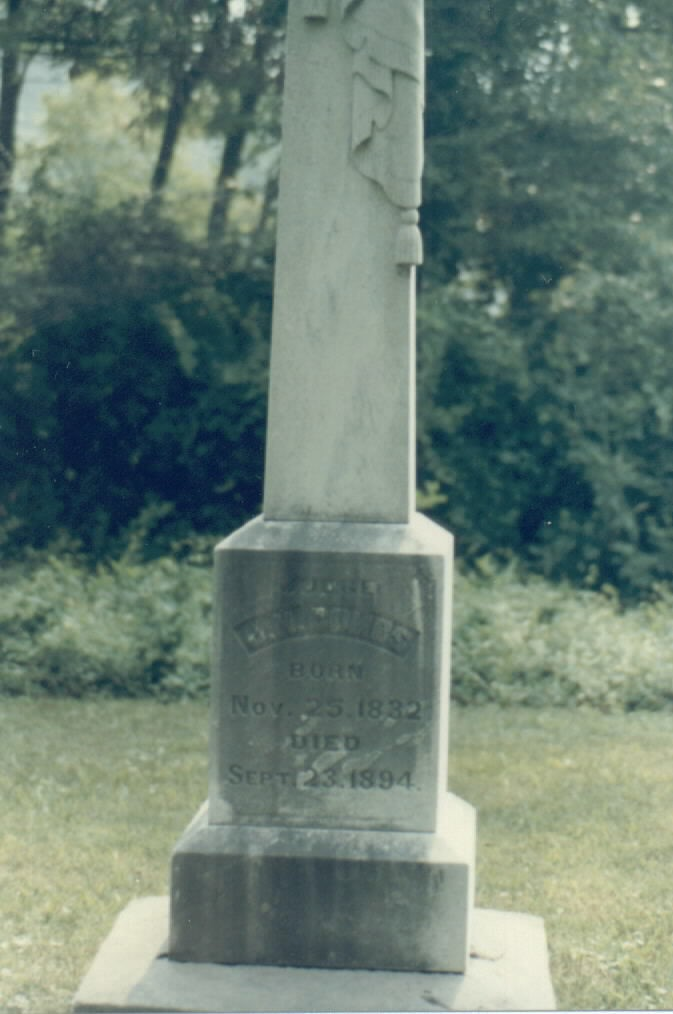
Grave of Judge Josiah Henry Combs, Hazard, Perry County, Kentucky

== Death ==
Josiah was assassinated on September 23, 1894, the last murder from that local civil war.

== Final justice ==
A number of books outline that most people believed that B. Fulton French was responsible for the murders of Joseph C. Eversole, his father-in-law, Josiah Henry Combs, and many others. In 1913 (19 years after the death of Judge Josah Combs), French accidentally ran into Joe Eversole's widow, Susan Combs Eversole in the lobby of a hotel in Elkatawa, Kentucky (near Jackson, Kentucky). With Mrs. Eversole was her youngest son, Harry C. Eversole then 28 years old. Harry was both the son of Joseph C. Eversole and the grandson of Judge Josiah Henry Combs. When French spoke to Mrs. Eversole, Harry pulled out a revolver and aware that French wore a bullet proof vest – shot him in the spleen. French initially recovered from his wounds and the Court fined Harry C. Eversole $75 for disturbing the peace. Susan Eversole paid the fine. In 1915, a little over a year after the shooting, French died from complications from the wound and was buried at the Winchester Cemetery in Clark County. While French never went to prison for the crime of orchestrating the Eversole clan murders, Harry was never tried for Fulton French's murder.

== Media articles ==
During the period from 1886 when notice arrived of Benjamin Fulton French amassing a private army to assassinate Joseph C. Eversole the public and media followed the twists and turns of the French–Eversole Feud and the various trials, battles, indictments, convictions, re-trials, and death of the participants. This is a list of the newspapers that ran articles about the war in order of appearance:

First Notice of Feud

- June 30, 1886 Louisville Courier-Journal, Louisville, Ky Page 1
- July 24, 1886 St. Louis Post Dispatch, St. Louis, Missouri Page 8
- July 25, 1886 Topeka Daily Capital, Topeka Kansas, Page 1
- August 24, 1886 The Republic, Columbus, Indiana, Page 1
- August 25, 1886 Wilkes-Barre Record, Wilkes-Barre, PA, page 1
- September 3, 1886 The Hickman Courier, Hickman, Ky, Page 1
- November 16, 1886 St. Paul Globe, St. Paul, Minnesota, Page 1

The Peace Treaty

- November 22, 1886 Newton Daily Republican, Newton, Kansas, Page 2
- November 25, 1886 Scott Weekly Monitor, Scott, Kansas, Page 6
- November 27, 1886 Phillipsburg Herald, Phillipsburg, Kansas, Page 1
- December 2, 1886 Phillipsburg Herald, Phillipsburg, Kansas, Page 1
- December 2, 1886 Greensboro North State, Greensboro, NC, Page 1

Assassination of Joseph C. Eversole

- April 17, 1888 Louisville Courier-Journal, Louisville, Ky, Page 1
- November 14, 1888 Decauter Herald, Decauter, Illinois, Page 1
- November 14, 1888 Ottawa Daily Republic, Ottawa, Kansas, page 1
- December 2, 1888 St. Louis Post Dispatch, St. Louis, Missouri, Page 6
- December 21, 1888 Columbus Journal, Columbus, Nebraska, Page 2
- December 21, 1888 Kingston Daily Freeman, Kingston, NY, Page 2
- December 23, 1888 Democrat and Chronicle, Rochester, NY, Page 1
- December 23, 1888 Galveston Daily News, Galveston, Texas, Page 3
- December 23, 1888 St. Paul Globe, St. Paul, Minnesota, page 22
- December 23, 1888 Detroit Free Press, Detroit, Michigan, page 3
- December 24, 1888 Ottawa Daily Republic, Ottawa, Kansas, Page 2
- December 27, 1888 Worthington Advance, Worthington, Minnesota, Page 2
- January 28, 1889 St. Louis Post Dispatch, St. Louis, Missouri, page 5

Battle of Hazard

- November 14, 1889 Salina Daily Republican, Salina, Kansas, Page 1
- November 15, 1889 Lawrence Daily Journal, Lawrence, Kansas, Page 1
- November 15, 1889 Times Picayune, New Orleans, Louisiana, Page 2
- November 15, 1889 The Cincinnati Enquirer, Cincinnati, Ohio, Page 1
- November 15, 1889 Detroit Free Press, Detroit, Michigan, Page 2
- November 15, 1889 Arkansas City Daily Traveler, Arkansas City, Kansas, Page 8
- November 15, 1889 The Pittsburgh Post, Pittsburgh, PA, Page 6
- November 16, 1889 Scranton Republican, Scranton, PA, Page 1
- November 16, 1889 The Times, Philadelphia, PA, Page 4
- November 23, 1889 Ohio Democrat, Logan, Ohio, Page 2
- December 21, 1889 People's Press, Winston-Salem, NC, Page 3

Continuing Bloodshed

- August 10, 1890 St. Louis Post Dispatch, St. Louis, Missouri, Page 3
- August 17, 1890 Independent Record, Helena, Montana, Page 9
- August 29, 1890 The Tennessean, Nashville, TN, Page 1
- August 29, 1890 Daily Arkansas Gazette, Little Rock, Arkansas, page 1
- August 29, 1890 Indianapolis News, Indianapolis, Indiana, Page 1
- August 30, 1890 Ironwood Times, Ironwood, Michigan, Page 1
- September 1, 1890 Independent Record, Helena, Montana, Page 1
- September 1, 1890 The Tennessean, Nashville, Tn, Page 1
- September 1, 1890 Sandusky Register, Sandusky, Ohio, Page 1
- September 2, 1890 Cincinnati Enquirer, Cincinnati, Ohio, Page 1
- September 2, 1890 Detroit Free Press, Detroit, Michigan, Page 4
- September 3, 1890 Somerset Herald, Somerset, PA, page 2
- September 3, 1890 The Republic, Columbus, Indiana, Page 1
- September 4, 1890 The Onaga Herald, Onaga, Kansas, Page 1
- September 7, 1890 Cincinnati Enquirer, Cincinnati, Ohio, Page 17
- September 8, 1890 The World, New York City, New York, Page 11
- September 11, 1890 The Index, Hermitage, Missouri, Page 1
- September 12, 1890 Big Stone Gap Post, Big Stone Gap, VA, Page 3
- September 19, 1890 Cincinnati Enquirer, Cincinnati, Ohio, Page 1
- September 20, 1890 The Lima News, Lima, Ohio, Page 1
- September 27, 1890 Chicago Daily Tribune, Chicago, Illinois, Page 4

Bad Tom Smith given Bail

- November 24, 1890 McPherson Daily Republican, McPherson, Kansas, Page 4

Continuing Bloodshed

- May 5, 1891 Scott Daily Monitor, Scott, Kansas, Page 1
- May 8, 1891 Lebanon Daily News, Lebanon, PA, Page 1
- February 28, 1892 St. Paul Globe, St. Paul, Minnesota, Page 16
- November 7, 1892 San Francisco Call, San Francisco, CA, page 16

False reports that Josiah Combs elderly wife was murdered

- May 21, 1893 Davenport Democrat and Leader, Davenport, Iowa, Page 9
- May 25, 1893 Warren Sheaf, Warren, Minnesota, Page 3
- May 25, 1893 Big Stone Gap Post, Big Stone Gap, VA, Page 3
- June 1, 1893 Der Fortshritt (in German), New Ulm, Minnesota, Page 2
- June 1, 1893 Princeton Union, Princeton, Minnesota, Page 2

Indictments, Trials and Acquittals

- October 10, 1893 Louisville Courier-Journal, Louisville, KY, Page 4
- December 15, 1893 Louisville Courier-Journal, Louisville, KY, Page 5

Judge Josiah Combs Targeted and killed

- October 18, 1894 Atchison Daily Champion, Atchison, Kansas, Page 1
- October 27, 1894 Perrysburg Journal, Perrysburg, Ohio, Page 2
- December 12, 1894 New York Times, New York, New York, Page 1
- December 12, 1894 Scranton Republican, Scranton, PA, page 2

More Trials, More indictments

- January 24, 1895 Springfield Leader, Springfield, Missouri, Page 1
- April 14, 1895 St. Louis Post Dispatch, St. Louis, Missouri, Page 21
- April 14, 1895 Louisville Courier-Journal, Louisville, KY, Page 15
- April 25, 1895 Louisville Courier-Journal, Louisville, KY Page 1
- June 15, 1895 Alexandria Gazette, Alexandria, Virginia, Page 2

Bad Tom Smith Confesses

- June 29, 1895 Daily Democrat, Huntington, Indiana, Page 1
- June 29, 1895 Cincinnati Enquirer, Cincinnati, Ohio, Page 1 and 5
- December 9, 1895 Cincinnati Enquirer, Cincinnati, Ohio, Page 1

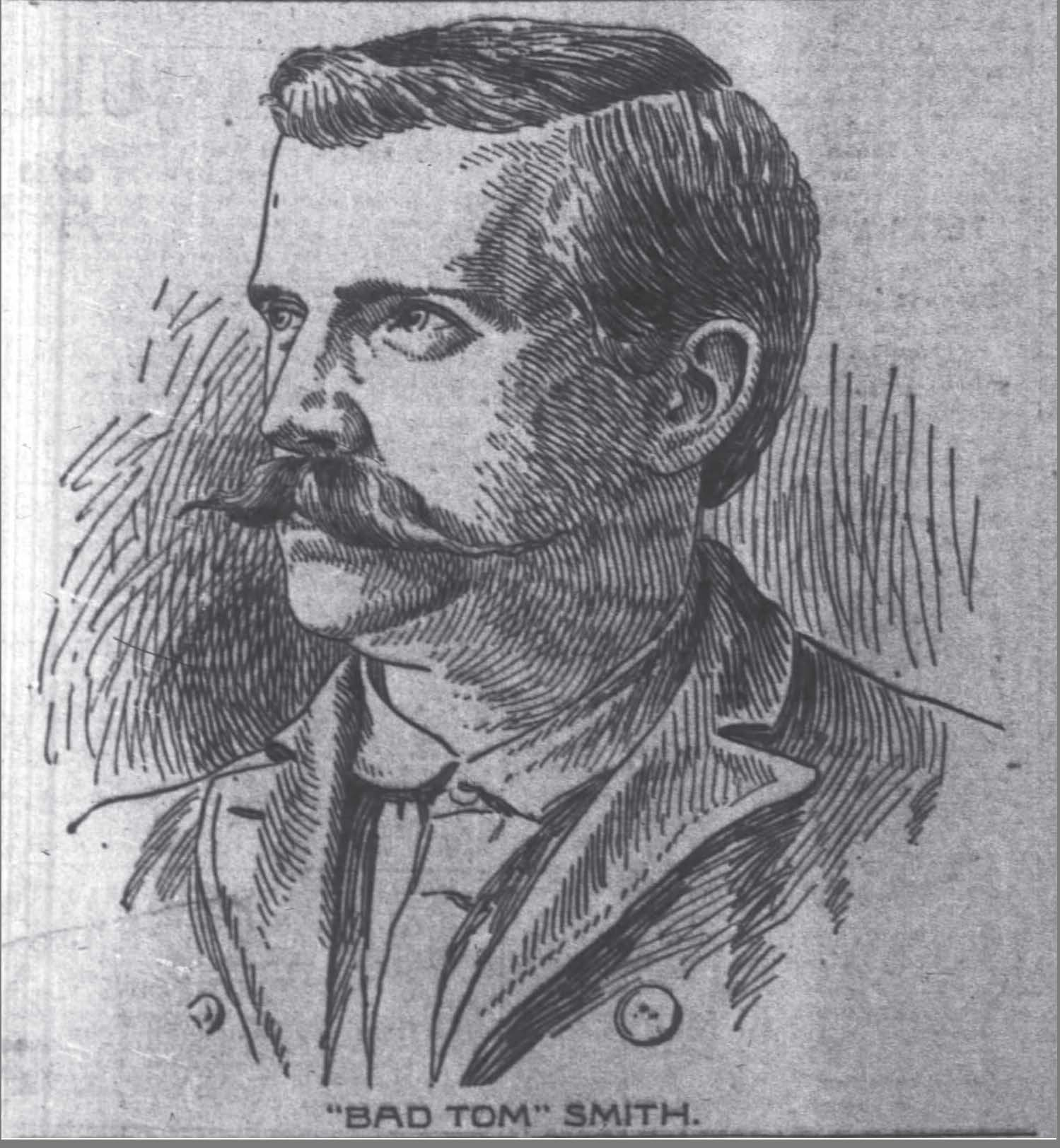
"Bad Tom' Smith

- December 16, 1895 Louisville Courier-Journal, Louisville, KY, Page 1
- December 17, 1895 Reading Times, Reading, PA, Page 1
- July 7, 1899 The Evening Times, Washington, DC, Page 3
- June 6, 1903 The Pittsburgh Press, Pittsburgh, PA, Page 40

Fulton French Charged with Murder over Marcum case

- March 4, 1904 Mountain Advocate, Barbourville, KY, Page 1
- March 25, 1904 Hartford Republican, Hartford, KY, Page 2
- August 17, 1906 Louisville Courier-Journal, Louisville, KY, Page 1
- March 17, 1907 Cincinnati Enquirer, Cincinnati, Ohio, Page 27
- March 24, 1907 Washington Times, Washington, DC, Page 44
- June 17, 1907 Janesville Daily Gazette, Janesville, Wisconsin, Page 1
- June 17, 1907 Kansas City Globe, Kansas City, Kansas, Page 1
- June 17, 1907 Goldsboro Daily Argus, Goldsboro, NC, Page 1
- November 30, 1907 The Pantagraph, Bloomington, Illinois, Page 1
- December 10, 1907 Louisville Courier-Journal, Louisville, KY, Page 1
- December 28, 1907 Paducah Evening Sun, Paducah, KY, Page 1
- November 20, 1908 New York Times, New York, New York, Page 2
- December 4, 1908 Hartford Republican, Hartford, Kentucky, Page 6

Fulton French and Mrs. Eversole meet

- July 31, 1910 Louisville Courier-Journal, Louisville, KY, Page 12

Fulton French dies

- January 6, 1915 Louisville Courier-Journal, Louisville, KY, Page 1
- January 7, 1915 Louisville Courier-Journal, Louisville, KY, Page 4
- January 7, 1915 Public Ledger, Maysville, KY, Page 4
