= Ebersol =

Ebersol is a surname. Notable people with the surname include:

- Charlie Ebersol (born 1982), American entrepreneur and filmmaker
- Dick Ebersol (born 1947), American television executive

== See also ==
- Ebersole
- Ebersold
- Eversole (surname)
