= French–Eversole feud =

19th-century conflict in Kentucky, US

The French–Eversole feud was a long-running dispute between two American families which occurred primarily from 1887 to 1894 in the mountains of southeastern Kentucky, mainly in the town of Hazard in Perry County. The two instigators of the feud were Joseph C. Eversole and Benjamin Fulton French, who were both merchants and lawyers and at one time were friendly. The conflict was a media sensation and was covered by many US papers at the time. The first report was in the Louisville Courier-Journal on June 30, 1886, on Page 1. A listing of the various media reports is included at the end of this article. Ultimately, those media reports became the basis for various books written about the French–Eversole War. Based on a report by General Sam Hill to Kentucky Governor Simon Bolivar Buckner, the feud killed more than 20 men. Other historians exaggerated the numbers killed to as many as 74 deaths.

French-Eversole Feud tin type (media recreation taken about 1890 after the Battle of Hazard). Eversole clan on the left, French clan on the right.

== Before the feud ==
Jacob Eversole was one of the first settlers in the Hazard area, moving from Lancaster County, Pennsylvania. Originally spelled 'Ebersohl', six brothers migrated from Europe to Pennsylvania: Abraham, Johannes, Peter, Yost, Carl, and Jacob. One of Yost Ebersohl's sons, Jacob, moved from Pennsylvania to Eastern Kentucky c. 1790–1800. When Perry County was created on November 2, 1820, by 'General' Elijah H. Combs, he named the small group of streets Hazard, which became the county seat. Both the county and the town are named after General Oliver Hazard Perry, a hero of the War of 1812. The small town had only one road, scattered buildings, and a few boards to walk on over the muddy streets. It became the trading center of the county with a population of around 100 at the time of the feud.

Jacob Eversole's son 'Woolery' G. Eversole married the daughter of Jesse Cornett, another founding family of Perry County. Woolery and Lucy Cornett Eversole had several children, one of which was Major John C. Eversole, who led portions of the 14th Kentucky Cavalry Regiment and was assassinated during the American Civil War. His own son, Joseph C. Eversole, married a woman from another prominent Perry County family, Susan Combs. Joseph was the leader of the Eversole clan during the French–Eversole feud.

Eversole and his counterpart, Benjamin Fulton French, were very similar men. They were both lawyers, merchants, and relatively well off for their time and place. French, however, was not a Kentuckian. He hailed from Tennessee but married a Kentuckian, Susan Lewis, and thereby was related by marriage to influential families in Breathitt, Leslie, and other counties. Both Eversole and French had competing mercantile stores in Hazard.

== Cause of the feud ==
There are two supposed origins for the feud. One is romanticized and probably not true, though it has become the most popular version of the story. The other is a definite and more reasonable cause for the start of the feud.

=== Cause 1 ('On Account of a Woman') ===
The popular story for the cause of the feud is a disagreement over a woman. As the story goes, a clerk that worked in French's mercantile store was madly in love. One day the clerk saw the woman with Benjamin Fulton French and he became jealous. He went to Joseph Eversole and told him that he had heard French say he sought to take his life. When Eversole questioned the clerk about the allegations he sat silent. Eversole warned him that he was taking his silence as fact that the allegations were true. Initially, Eversole did not believe the clerk. He asked him to sign a sworn affidavit attesting to the plan to murder him. This is allegedly what caused Eversole to believe that he needed protection and to begin to gather an armed clan. French followed suit closely after and a war became unavoidable. It is believed that this fabrication was the clerk's form of revenge on Fulton French.

=== Cause 2 ('Coal rights') ===
The more likely story is that Eversole and French, two prominent businessmen in the town, came at odds with each other over a business-related disagreement. After the Civil War, companies began buying huge amounts of land in the Appalachians in order to obtain rights to coal deposits underneath the mountains. French worked for one of these companies, which was buying coal rights from illiterate farmers, while Eversole was a local merchant and had loyalty to many of the area's long-time residents (most of whom he was related to). French was intent upon buying the land at the lowest possible price for the large companies he represented. Eversole saw this practice as cheating illiterate farmers. He began to travel the county and tell farmers that Fulton French was going to try and cheat them by offering unfair prices for 'coal rights'. French, as a non-native, had no such loyalty to the mountain people of Eastern Kentucky. Resentment between the two sides grew until they eventually raised their armies; French reportedly paid $2–$2.50 a day to his hired guns.

== Assassinations ==
Ambush was the favored tactic of this feud rather than standard warfare. It was safer for the concealed perpetrators and responsibility for the attacks was more difficult to determine. Many people lived, justifiably, in fear.

The first death attributed to the feud was one of French's friends, Silas Gayheart. A dozen white men and a couple of African-Americans reportedly ambushed and killed Gayheart. The Eversoles denied the killing and many believed it had been the result of a different dispute that Gayheart had. French, however, blamed the Eversole clan.

One night French left Hazard, possibly to gather more men to attack Eversole. Once Eversole discovered this, he withdrew his forces and left a few men in town. He waited for French to attack the town so he could make a surprise attack of his own. Neither was fooled by these tactical maneuvers and blood was spared. When French finally re-entered the town in June 1887, Eversole set out to meet him. The two sides had a shootout in town; only one of French's men was wounded. After a day of shooting at each other, French's forces withdrew.

This type of cat-and-mouse scuffle was repeated throughout the summer of 1887. The cost of paying these men day in and day out began taking their tolls on the businessmen as they became nearly bankrupt (or at least were out of cash). Both sides owned most of the large land tracts in Perry County. Both sides eventually agreed to a meeting at Big Creek, where a peace was formulated. The written agreements were signed and witnessed. The agreement required that they return home, disband their armies, and surrender their guns. The grudge was still there, however, and soon after their funds were replenished, French accused Eversole of taking his guns back from Judge Josiah Combs, Eversole's father-in-law. Eversole claimed that French had not witnessed this, that he had not disbanded his army, and that the deal only called for a partial surrender of arms. The short-lived peace crumbled.

The next major incident occurred on September 15, 1887. Joe Eversole and Bill Gambriel, an itinerant preacher and a supporter of French, began arguing in the street in Hazard. This quickly devolved into a fist fight. Some of Eversole's men shot at Gambriel and wounded him. While attempting to escape, another man, reportedly an officer, shot him. As Gambriel turned away from his attacker, Joe Eversole pulled his pistol out and shot Gambriel in the head, instantly killing him. Another man, not Eversole, was tried for the murder. The first trial resulted in a hung jury and the second in an acquittal. Joe Eversole himself was not tried because witnesses said that Gambriel had attacked Joe first.

There was a relative calm throughout the winter until Sunday, April 15, 1888. Joe Eversole, his brother-in-law Nick Combs, and Judge Josiah Combs were on their way to Hyden for the regular term of the circuit court, of which Joe and Josiah had been members for years. Judge Combs was riding slightly ahead of Joe and Nick with policeman Tom Hollifield, who was transporting a prisoner (Mary Jones) to Hyden, when Josiah heard gunfire. Josiah turned and saw Joe and Nick fall to the ground. Joe died almost instantly. After investigating, it appeared the attackers had been camping for days and waiting to ambush them. French was accused and indicted but left town with a posse in fear of retaliation. No one was ever convicted of the murders, but seven years later, 'Bad Tom' Smith, a paid enforcer for French, confessed while standing on the gallows. He stated that he and Joseph Adkins had committed the murders under orders from French.

After Joe Eversole's death, John Campbell took over the war against French. Campbell surrounded the town with guards, had men patrol the streets, and took on scouting the countryside. He feared a French attack so he only let people into town who knew the password.

While Campbell was still alive, Shade Combs had an idea that he could end the feud by killing French and a select few of his men. Campbell gave him men and he set out to do the deed. French got wind of the plot and set up an ambush of his own. Combs escaped only to succumb to a successful ambush soon after at his home.

Elijah Morgan, son-in-law to Judge Josiah Combs, was a French supporter and was the next to be assassinated, on October 9, 1888. He was working on an agreement with Frank Grace when he was ambushed. He wanted peace and the Eversole clan told him to meet them in Hazard to discuss a deal. This was all a ploy to lure him in and he was murdered. It is widely believed this was retaliation for the death of Shade Combs since they occurred so close together.

Judge Lilly, responsible for the law in Perry as well as other counties, had then had enough. He dispatched state troops to Hazard, which arrived in early November 1888. He wrote the Governor of Kentucky, Simon Bolivar Buckner, on November 13, 1888, telling him of the need for troops and that he would not conduct court in Perry nor in other counties without a state guard for fear of shootings. On November 14, 1888, Sam Hill, who was in charge of the state troops, wrote to Governor Buckner that only 35 people remained in town when they arrived. Many came back after the troops arrived and explained that the juries' ties to the clans or fear of the accused had caused lawlessness. The November 1888 term of court went by with ease since the troops were occupying the town.

== Battle of Hazard ==
The Battle of Hazard occurred the following year on the fourth court day, November 8, 1889. A supposedly inebriated Campbell was on Graveyard Hill and discharged his gun. A storekeeper saw him shooting, took aim, and killed Campbell with one shot. The people in the courthouse heard the shot, thought it was a result of the feud, and scattered. The Eversole clan then took control of the courthouse and French's men captured the jailhouse. Jesse Fields and Bob Profitt, both French men, escaped from the courthouse's second story and made it to the jail. That night they escaped the jailhouse to regroup with the rest of the French party. Jesse Fields and 'Bad' Tom Smith then took the high ground on Graveyard Hill. J. McKnight, an Eversole man, attempted to run across the street with a friend to gain some ground and was shot dead by French's men. The Eversoles retreated across the river after their ammo was exhausted. They left Green Morris and one other along the river bank so they could escape safely. When Jesse Fields and Tom Smith pursued, Morris opened fire and hit Fields in the arm. The Battle of Hazard was over.

== End ==
Following the incidents in Hazard, the courthouse was burned down on July 4, 1890, though the records were saved.

Robin Cornett, an Eversole supporter, returned to his home hoping to be done with the feud. He was ambushed and killed in July 1890 when he went to cut a tree in the forest near his home.

This was the final straw for Judge Lilly. He appeared with state troops for a special August court term in 1890 that would be held in a tent. They quickly brought up each of the accused and sent them to Clark County to be tried. Lilly knew there was no way any would have a fair trial in Hazard and feared another battle in the town. None of the accused were allowed bail at first. The jail became so full they had to keep the men in a guarded tent. The "Blanket Court" worked well and there were little to no incidents until 1894.

In 1894, Josiah Combs decided to return to the home he loved, hoping the fighting was all over. He was ambushed and killed while having a conversation with friends outside of his house. A large field of corn was growing in Hazard. The killers, Joe Adkins, Jesse Fields, and Boone Frazier, hid in the corn and fired at Judge Combs. None of this would have come to light except that 'Bad' Tom Smith had been arrested for a different murder and sentenced to death row previously for the murder of Dr. John E. Rader. He gave a gallows confession outlining how Fulton French had organized the plot and that Joe Adkins had fired the fatal shot that killed Judge Combs. French was acquitted of the charges, Frazier was never caught, Fields was sentenced to life then acquitted in a second trial, and Adkins received life in both trials, though he only served 8 years before being released.

After the events in Hazard, Benjamin Fulton French began wearing a bulletproof vest. Years later, in 1913, French came across Susan Eversole, Joe's widow, and her son Harry Clay Eversole (then 28), sometimes referred to as 'One Arm' Harry since he lost an arm in childhood. French said "Good Morning, Mrs. Eversole". Harry took out his pistol and shot him in the spleen. Harry was only charged a $75 fine for disturbing the peace. French did die from the shot from 'One Arm' Harry, though it took him over a year before he finally succumbed to the wound in 1915.

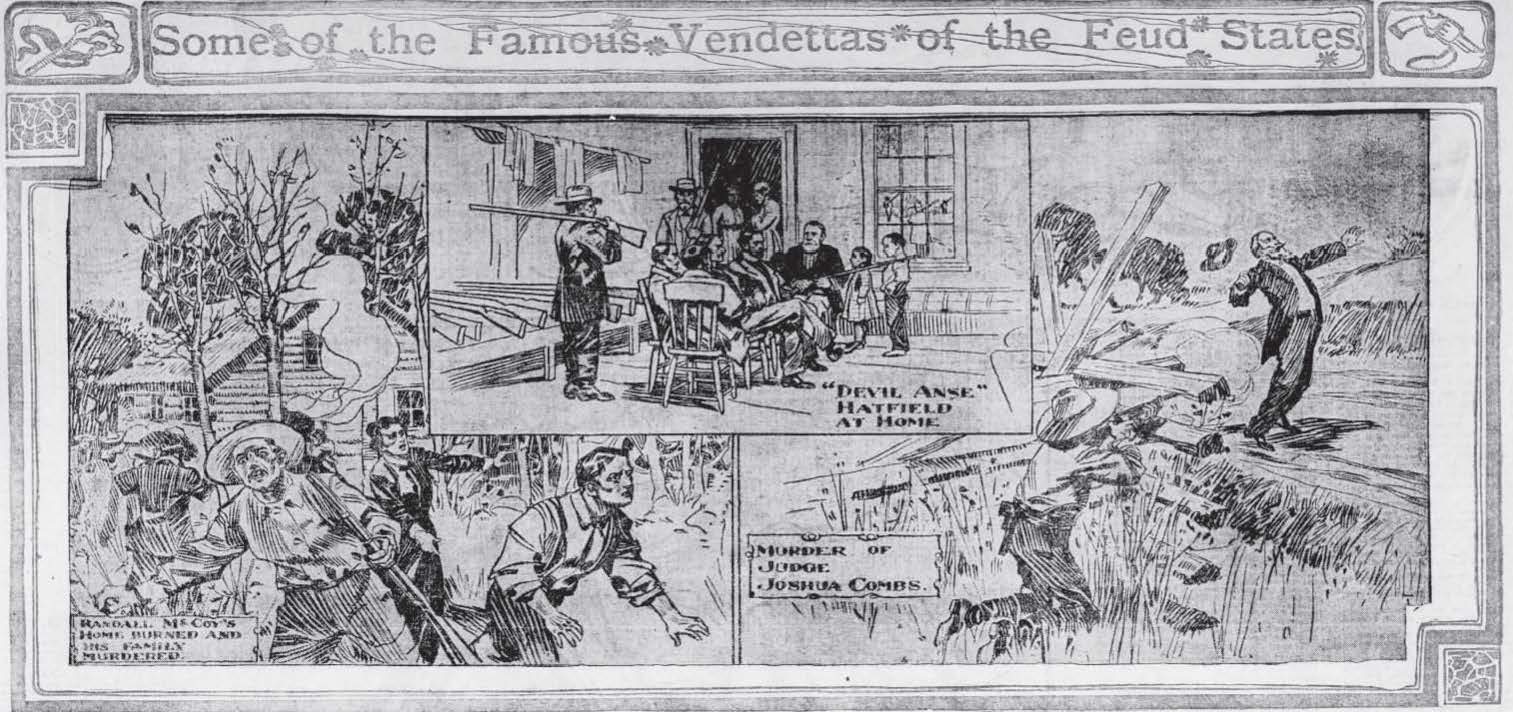
Graphic image of the murder of Judge Josiah Henry Combs (last killing of the French–Eversole War)

== Media coverage ==
During the period from 1886 when notice arrived of Benjamin Fulton French amassing a private army to assassinate Joseph C. Eversole, the public and media eagerly followed the twists and turns of the French–Eversole feud and the various battles, indictments, trials, convictions, re-trials, and deaths of the participants. This is a list of the newspapers that ran articles about the war in order of appearance:

First reports

- June 30, 1886 – Louisville Courier-Journal, Louisville, Kentucky, Page 1
- July 24, 1886 – St. Louis Post-Dispatch, St. Louis, Missouri, Page 8
- July 25, 1886 – Topeka Daily Capital, Topeka, Kansas, Page 1
- August 24, 1886 – The Republic, Columbus, Indiana, Page 1
- August 25, 1886 – Wilkes-Barre Record, Wilkes-Barre, Pennsylvania, page 1
- September 3, 1886 – The Hickman Courier, Hickman, Kentucky, Page 1
- November 16, 1886 – St. Paul Globe, St. Paul, Minnesota, Page 1

The peace treaty

- November 22, 1886 – Newton Daily Republican, Newton, Kansas, Page 2
- November 25, 1886 – Scott Weekly Monitor, Scott, Kansas, Page 6
- November 27, 1886 – Phillipsburg Herald, Phillipsburg, Kansas, Page 1
- December 2, 1886 – Phillipsburg Herald, Phillipsburg, Kansas, Page 1
- December 2, 1886 – Greensboro North State, Greensboro, North Carolina, Page 1

Assassination of Joseph C. Eversole

- April 17, 1888 – Louisville Courier-Journal, Louisville, Kentucky, Page 1
- November 14, 1888 – Decatur Herald, Decatur, Illinois, Page 1
- November 14, 1888 – Ottawa Daily Republic, Ottawa, Kansas, page 1
- December 2, 1888 – St. Louis Post-Dispatch, St. Louis, Missouri, Page 6
- December 21, 1888 – Columbus Journal, Columbus, Nebraska, Page 2
- December 21, 1888 – Kingston Daily Freeman, Kingston, NY, Page 2
- December 23, 1888 – Democrat and Chronicle, Rochester, NY, Page 1
- December 23, 1888 – Galveston Daily News, Galveston, Texas, Page 3
- December 23, 1888 – St. Paul Globe, St. Paul, Minnesota, page 22
- December 23, 1888 – Detroit Free Press, Detroit, Michigan, page 3
- December 24, 1888 – Ottawa Daily Republic, Ottawa, Kansas, Page 2
- December 27, 1888 – Worthington Advance, Worthington, Minnesota, Page 2
- January 28, 1889 – St. Louis Post-Dispatch, St. Louis, Missouri, page 5

Battle of Hazard

- November 14, 1889 – Salina Daily Republican, Salina, Kansas, Page 1
- November 15, 1889 – Lawrence Daily Journal, Lawrence, Kansas, Page 1
- November 15, 1889 – Times-Picayune, New Orleans, Louisiana, Page 2
- November 15, 1889 – The Cincinnati Enquirer, Cincinnati, Ohio, Page 1
- November 15, 1889 – Detroit Free Press, Detroit, Michigan, Page 2
- November 15, 1889 – Arkansas City Daily Traveler, Arkansas City, Kansas, Page 8
- November 15, 1889 – The Pittsburgh Post, Pittsburgh, PA, Page 6
- November 16, 1889 – Scranton Republican, Scranton, PA, Page 1
- November 16, 1889 – The Times, Philadelphia, Pennsylvania, Page 4
- November 23, 1889 – Ohio Democrat, Logan, Ohio, Page 2
- December 21, 1889 – People's Press, Winston-Salem, North Carolina, Page 3

Continuing bloodshed

- August 10, 1890 – St. Louis Post-Dispatch, St. Louis, Missouri, Page 3
- August 17, 1890 – Independent Record, Helena, Montana, Page 9
- August 29, 1890 – The Tennessean, Nashville, Tennessee, Page 1
- August 29, 1890 – Daily Arkansas Gazette, Little Rock, Arkansas, page 1
- August 29, 1890 – Indianapolis News, Indianapolis, Indiana, Page 1
- August 30, 1890 – Ironwood Times, Ironwood, Michigan, Page 1
- September 1, 1890 – Independent Record, Helena, Montana, Page 1
- September 1, 1890 – The Tennessean, Nashville, Tennessee, Page 1
- September 1, 1890 – Sandusky Register, Sandusky, Ohio, Page 1
- September 2, 1890 – Cincinnati Enquirer, Cincinnati, Ohio, Page 1
- September 2, 1890 – Detroit Free Press, Detroit, Michigan, Page 4
- September 3, 1890 – Somerset Herald, Somerset, Pennsylvania, page 2
- September 3, 1890 – The Republic, Columbus, Indiana, Page 1
- September 4, 1890 – The Onaga Herald, Onaga, Kansas, Page 1
- September 7, 1890 – Cincinnati Enquirer, Cincinnati, Ohio, Page 17
- September 8, 1890 – The World, New York City, New York, Page 11
- September 11, 1890 – The Index, Hermitage, Missouri, Page 1
- September 12, 1890 – Big Stone Gap Post, Big Stone Gap, Virginia, Page 3
- September 19, 1890 – Cincinnati Enquirer, Cincinnati, Ohio, Page 1
- September 20, 1890 – The Lima News, Lima, Ohio, Page 1
- September 27, 1890 – Chicago Daily Tribune, Chicago, Illinois, Page 4

Bad Tom Smith given bail

- November 24, 1890 – McPherson Daily Republican, McPherson, Kansas, Page 4

Continuing bloodshed

- May 5, 1891 – Scott Daily Monitor, Scott, Kansas, Page 1
- May 8, 1891 – Lebanon Daily News, Lebanon, Pennsylvania, Page 1
- February 28, 1892 – St. Paul Globe, St. Paul, Minnesota, Page 16
- November 7, 1892 – San Francisco Call, San Francisco, California, page 16

False reports that Josiah Combs's elderly wife was murdered

- May 21, 1893 – Davenport Democrat and Leader, Davenport, Iowa, Page 9
- May 25, 1893 – Warren Sheaf, Warren, Minnesota, Page 3
- May 25, 1893 – Big Stone Gap Post, Big Stone Gap, Virginia, Page 3
- June 1, 1893 – Der Fortshritt (in German), New Ulm, Minnesota, Page 2
- June 1, 1893 – Princeton Union, Princeton, Minnesota, Page 2

Indictments, trials, and acquittals

- October 10, 1893 – Louisville Courier-Journal, Louisville, Kentucky, Page 4
- December 15, 1893 – Louisville Courier-Journal, Louisville, Kentucky, Page 5

Judge Josiah Combs targeted and killed

- October 18, 1894 Atchison Daily Champion, Atchison, Kansas, Page 1
- October 27, 1894 Perrysburg Journal, Perrysburg, Ohio, Page 2
- December 12, 1894 New York Times, New York, New York, Page 1
- December 12, 1894 Scranton Republican, Scranton, PA, page 2

More trials, more indictments

- January 24, 1895 – Springfield Leader, Springfield, Missouri, Page 1
- April 14, 1895 – St. Louis Post-Dispatch, St. Louis, Missouri, Page 21
- April 14, 1895 – Louisville Courier-Journal, Louisville, Kentucky, Page 15
- April 25, 1895 – Louisville Courier-Journal, Louisville, Kentucky, Page 1
- June 15, 1895 – Alexandria Gazette, Alexandria, Virginia, Page 2

Bad Tom Smith confesses

- June 29, 1895 – Daily Democrat, Huntington, Indiana, Page 1
- June 29, 1895 – Cincinnati Enquirer, Cincinnati, Ohio, Page 1 and 5
- December 9, 1895 – Cincinnati Enquirer, Cincinnati, Ohio, Page 1

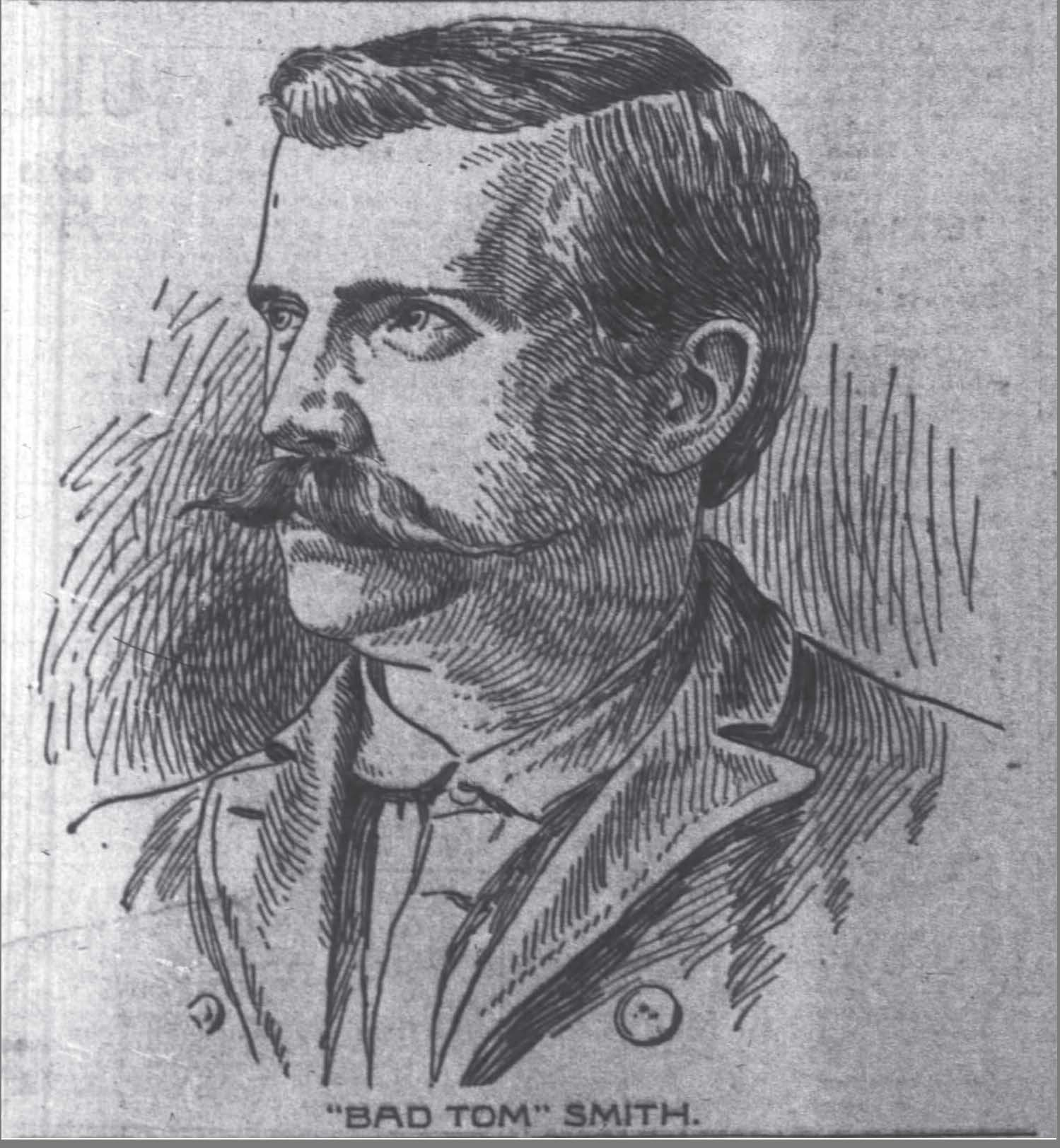
'Bad Tom' Smith, confessed murderer of Joseph C. Eversole. He was paid to kill Eversole by Fulton French.

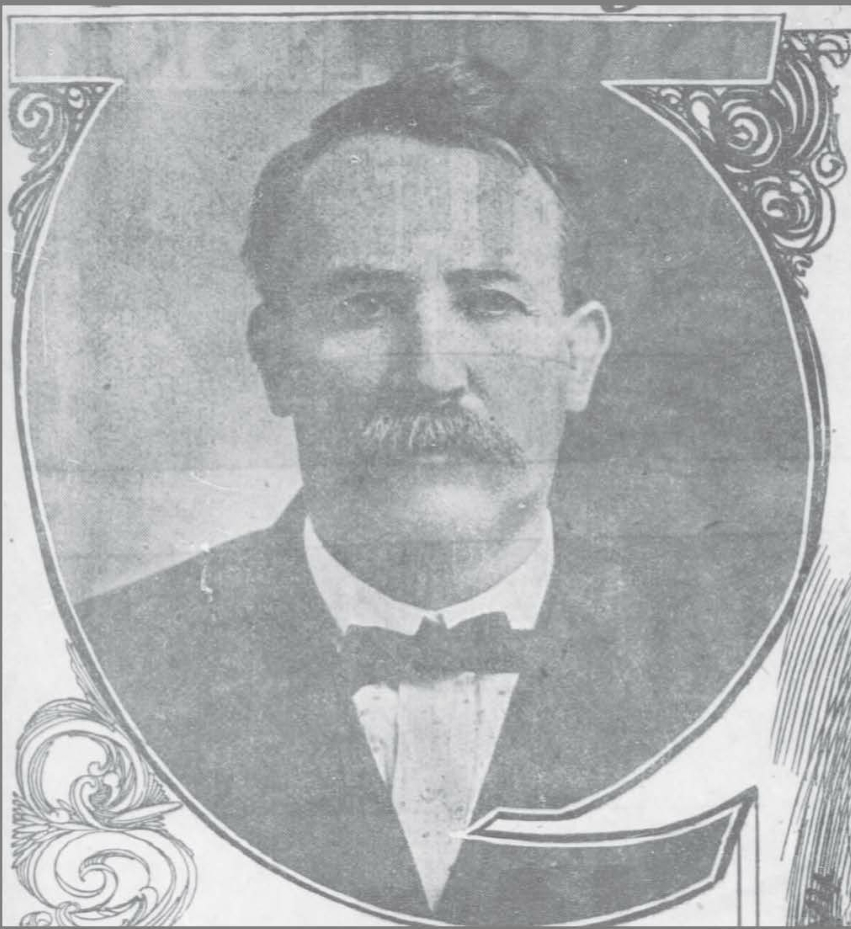
Benjamin Fulton French, leader of the French faction in the French–Eversole War

- December 16, 1895 – Louisville Courier-Journal, Louisville, Kentucky, Page 1
- December 17, 1895 – Reading Times, Reading, Pennsylvania, Page 1
- July 7, 1899 – The Evening Times, Washington, DC, Page 3
- June 6, 1903 – The Pittsburgh Press, Pittsburgh, Pennsylvania, Page 40

Fulton French charged with murder over Marcum case

- March 4, 1904 – Mountain Advocate, Barbourville, Kentucky, Page 1
- March 25, 1904 – Hartford Republican, Hartford, Kentucky, Page 2
- August 17, 1906 – Louisville Courier-Journal, Louisville, KY, Page 1
- March 17, 1907 – Cincinnati Enquirer, Cincinnati, Ohio, Page 27
- March 24, 1907 – Washington Times, Washington, DC, Page 44
- June 17, 1907 – Janesville Daily Gazette, Janesville, Wisconsin, Page 1
- June 17, 1907 – Kansas City Globe, Kansas City, Kansas, Page 1
- June 17, 1907 – Goldsboro Daily Argus, Goldsboro, North Carolina, Page 1
- November 30, 1907 – The Pantagraph, Bloomington, Illinois, Page 1
- December 10, 1907 – Louisville Courier-Journal, Louisville, Kentucky, Page 1
- December 28, 1907 – Paducah Evening Sun, Paducah, Kentucky, Page 1
- November 20, 1908 – New York Times, New York, New York, Page 2
- December 4, 1908 – Hartford Republican, Hartford, Kentucky, Page 6

Fulton French and Mrs. Eversole meet

- July 31, 1910 – Louisville Courier-Journal, Louisville, Kentucky, Page 12

Fulton French dies

- January 6, 1915 – Louisville Courier-Journal, Louisville, Kentucky, Page 1
- January 7, 1915 – Louisville Courier-Journal, Louisville, Kentucky, Page 4
- January 7, 1915 – Public Ledger, Maysville, Kentucky, Page 4
