= Arch Glass Mainous =

American banker and insurance executive

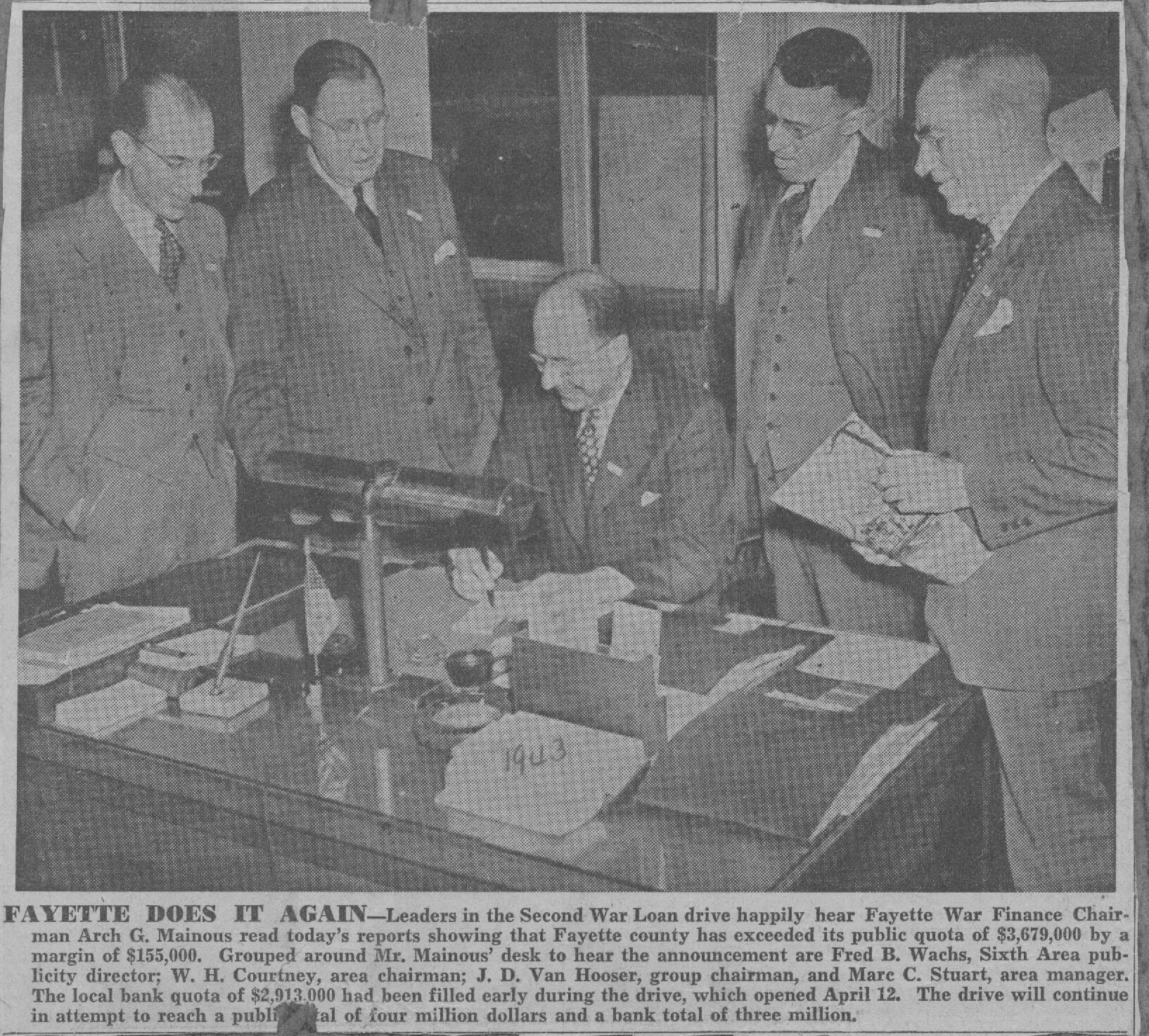
- Arch Mainous and Bond Drive members celebrate WW2 Bond sales in Lexington, Kentucky
- Born: April 7, 1899; Owsley County, Kentucky
- Died: August 17, 1990 (aged 91); Lexington, Kentucky
- Education: Sue Bennett College
- Occupation: Banker
- Known for: Founding a number of banks in Kentucky
- Spouse: Juanita Nell Cornett (m. 1927)
- Children: 3

Arch Glass Mainous Sr. (April 7, 1899 – August 17, 1990) was an American banker and insurance executive who was the founder or chairman of a number of banks and insurance companies in Kentucky. This included Citizens Union National Bank & Trust Company in Lexington (merged out of existence), Kentucky, First Federal Savings and Loan of Lexington, Kentucky (closed), Kentucky Family Life (Merged with Jefferson Pilot).

He also became the executive Vice President of the American Bankers Association in 1955 and the president of the Kentucky Bankers Association in 1956

He was married Juanita Nell Cornett, the daughter of Kentucky politician William Manon Cornett.

== Early life and education ==
During the late 1910s Mainous moved from the farm to Appalachia, Virginia to work for a bank founded by his half-brother, Edward Chester Mainous. Edward Chester Mainous (1882–1922) assisted his brothers, Arch Glass Mainous (1899–1990), William Lazarus 'Laz' Mainous (1890–1983), and Isaac 'Ike' Sylvester Mainous (1903–1955) to enter the world of Finance. Laz ran The First National Bank of Appalachia, Arch ran the Citizens Union National Bank in Lexington, Kentucky and Ike was Assistant Vice President of First National Bank in Bristol, Tennessee.

When his brother, Edward Chester Mainous, was killed in an auto accident in 1922, Arch went to business school and attended what would become Sue Bennett College. After school, Arch Glass moved to Miami, Florida, and took a job working at First National Bank of Miami as head of its savings department. In Miami, Arch Glass Mainous appeared three (3) times in the Miami Herald newspaper discussing his management of the savings department.

== Career ==
While working at the First National Bank of Miami, FL, Arch eventually lost his job after the 1926 hurricane caused a run on bank deposits. The hurricane caused an economic depression in South Florida at the time.

Nevertheless, on January 27, 1927, Arch Glass is recorded as obtaining a wedding license in Miami, Florida, to marry Juanita Nell Cornett. Arch stayed in Miami through 1927 continuing to work at the First National Bank of Miami while his first child was born at the end of 1927 at Victoria Hospital.

Upon returning to Kentucky in 1928 he left his wife and child at his parents house in Owsley County, Kentucky and lived with his sister in Cleveland, Ohio at 636 East 94th Street and worked for the Humphrey Company selling popcorn and peanuts in the Theater district for about a year. While there, a comedian named Bob Hope and his brother also sold popcorn and peanuts with Arch while trying to get into vaudeville. A reference to this event is recorded in a 1978 Lexington Herald Leader article about Arch Mainous.

In 1929, his father-in-law, former Deputy Insurance Commissioner William Manon Cornett helped his son-in-law Arch Glass obtain a job as a Trust Examiner for the Kentucky Banking Department and he and his family moved initially to Georgetown, Kentucky. During his examination of various banks he evaluated one in 1931 in Lexington, Kentucky called 'Deposit Guaranty Bank'. Arch moved to Lexington in 1930 and lived in several rental houses before purchasing his first home in the fall of 1931. Deposit Guaranty was closed due to insolvency and, in 1932 upon re-opening, Arch Glass was offered the position of Assistant Cashier and began purchasing stock.

=== Deposit Guarantee becomes Citizens Bank ===
After the closure of the Deposit Guaranty Bank, the bank was re-organized and re-opened as 'Citizens Bank and Trust Co' in 1932. During the period from its formation in 1932 through the 1950s the bank grew and eventually merged with the adjacent 'Union Bank' creating the 'Citizens Union bank'. The Merger of the two occurred on January 1, 1955.

Arch Mainous was appointed president of the Lexington Clearinghouse (a consortium of banks in Lexington, Kentucky) used to process the clearing of checks and bank drafts.

In December 1946 the existing chairman of Citizens Bank, Thomas C. Bradley died and Arch Mainous was elected to the position of chairman of Citizens Bank and Trust.

In 1958 the bank became a National bank becoming 'Citizens Union National Bank and Trust Company' whose offices were at 201 to 203 Short Street in Lexington, Kentucky, opposite Court House square.

Arch Glass Mainous was known for being innovative. During the banking holiday established by President Franklin D. Roosevelt in 1933 Arch was able to re-structure Citizens Bank with an infusion of preferred stock bought by the US Government. This allowed Citizens Union to continue and grow, eventually becoming the second-largest bank in Lexington, Kentucky. In 1955 he was elected an executive vice president of the American Bankers Association and in 1956 was made president of the Kentucky Bankers Association. Over the years, Arch established a variety of branch banks throughout Lexington, Kentucky. Near his retirement, in 1971 he helped orchestrate the building of 'Citizens Bank Square' in Lexington and Citizens Union also became known as 'The gold bank' (for the gold glass along the exterior of its new building). It was the first major urban renewal project in Lexington, Kentucky.

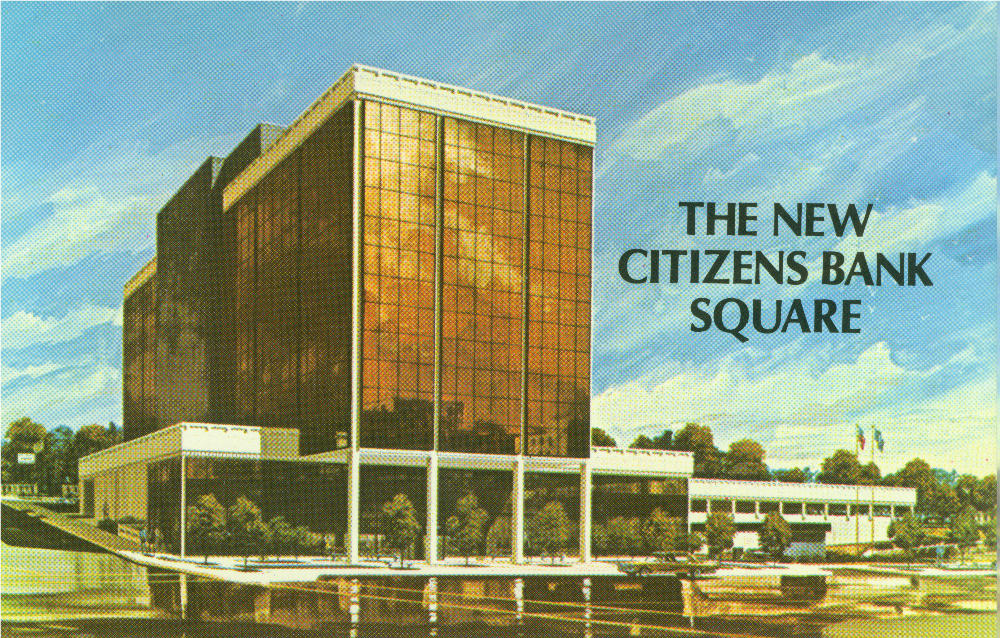
Citizens Bank Square, Citizens Union National Bank and Trust Co, Lexington, Kentucky

Eventually, in 1982 he sold Citizens Union to Tennessee banker Jake Butcher. After Mr. Butcher's financial problems the bank moved through several owners and became part of Bank One.

=== Formation of First Federal Savings and Loan ===
In 1935, Arch Glass Mainous was first in line to file for the name "First Federal Savings and Loan", a mutual (depositor owned) association that was approved by the US Federal Savings and Loan Act created under the New Deal. He served as its chairman for the remainder of his life. The Savings and Loan continued in operation until the early 2000s when it was closed.

=== Formation of Kentucky Family Life ===
In the 1950s, Arch Glass Mainous worked with another individual to establish the Kentucky Family Life company. It was eventually merged with Jefferson Pilot. The life insurance company was initially sold in 1966 to Financial Security Corp of Bowling Green, Kentucky, and much later was absorbed into Jefferson Pilot.

== Civic involvement ==
Mainous and the various organizations he ran were involved in various civic affairs. In 1942, Mainous and other finance leaders in Kentucky established a 'Bond Defense Group'.

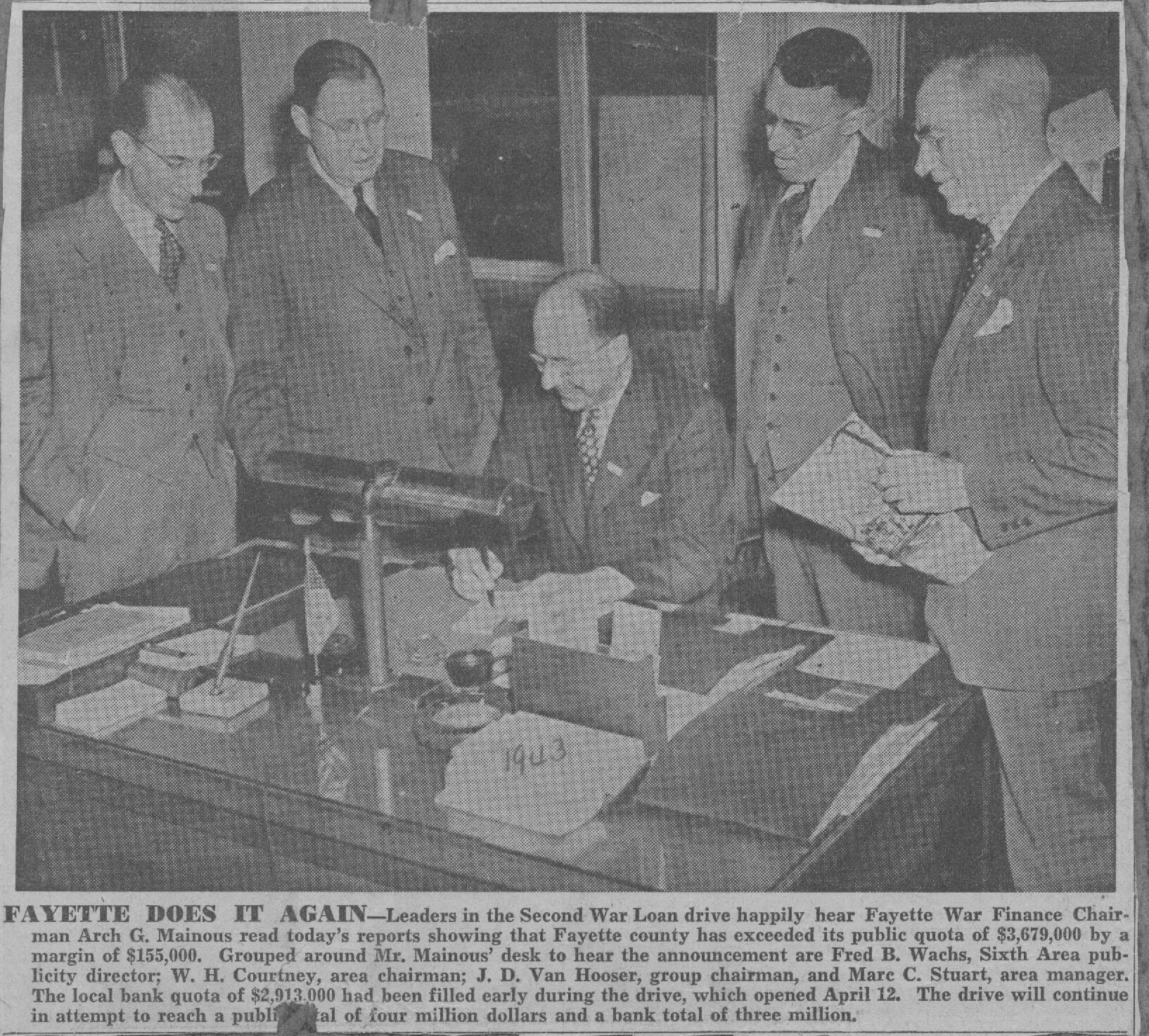
Arch Mainous and Bond Drive members celebrate WW2 Bond sales in Lexington, Kentucky

Arch won a medal from the US Treasury in 1945 for assisting in selling large amounts of US war bonds during World War II.

Arch served as the President of the Lexington, Kentucky Chamber of Commerce for a number of years.

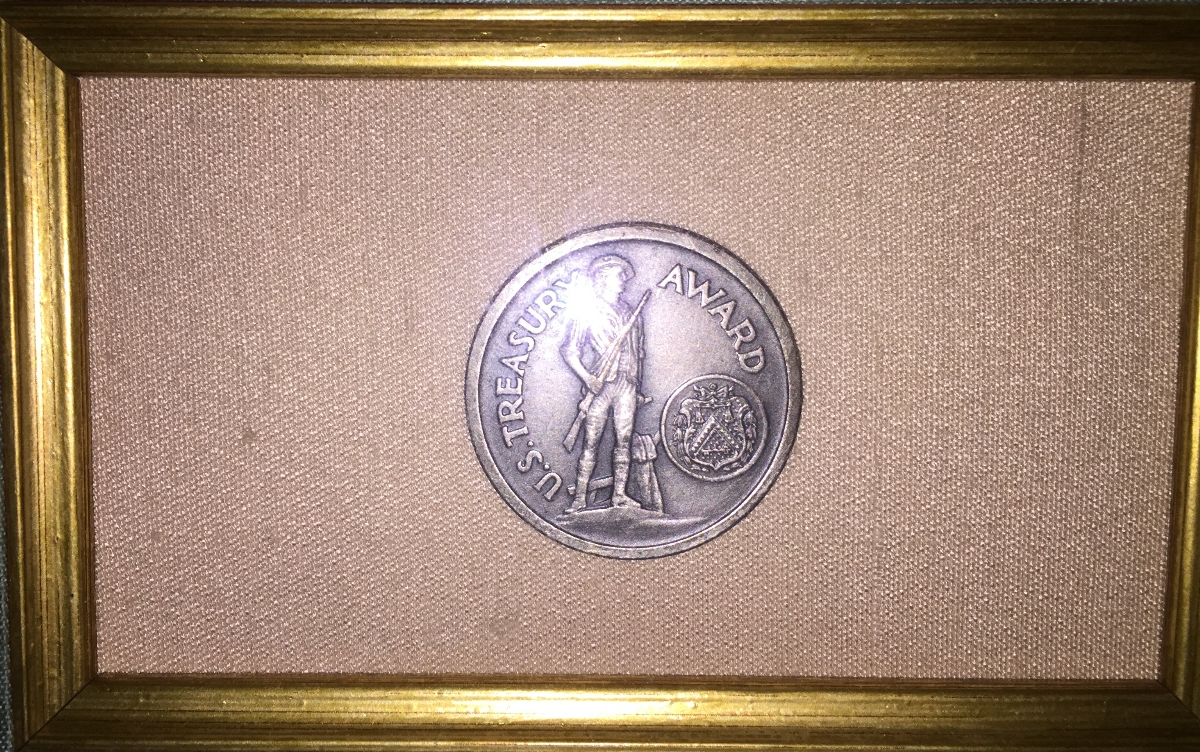
Arch Glass Mainous awarded US Treasury Award for selling War Bonds

He assisted in providing banking services (through Citizens Union National Bank) to bring IBM to Lexington, Kentucky where they opened a factory in 1956 to build 'Selectric' typewriters. He was a member and Treasurer Emeritus of the Oleika Shrine in Lexington, Kentucky and ran their yearly Shrine Circus to benefit the Shriners Hospital for Crippled Children. He was also a life member of the Lexington, Kentucky Salvation Army Board and served in lay positions with First United Methodist Church.

== Family and Death ==
He married Juanita Nell Cornett, the daughter of Kentucky politician William Manon Cornett & Clara Belle Eversole on January 27, 1927, in Miami, Florida.

Arch Glass Mainous Sr had three children; Joseph Edward Mainous, Jane Carol Mainous and Arch G. Mainous Jr. Arch died on August 17, 1990 about 4 weeks after his wife. Both are buried at Hillcrest Memorial Park in Lexington, Kentucky.

Over the period of his life, the media run a variety of articles on his life and banking career. One was 'Arch Mainous Sr: A banking Career based on caring'. Another was on June 5, 1967, entitled "50 years of banking". Even as early as 1957, Lexington, Kentucky media wrote of his rise from farming in Eastern Kentucky and the impact that his older half-brother had in helping Arch and two of his brothers enter the world of Finance.
