= Ryan Maness =

American cybersecurity expert

Ryan Maness is an American cybersecurity expert and an assistant professor at the Defense Analysis Department of Naval Postgraduate School. He is the co-author of Cyber War Versus Cyber Realities: Cyber Conflict in the International System, which won widespread critical acclaim.

== Education ==
Ryan Maness double majored in political science and history from the University of Illinois at Urbana–Champaign in 2008, before receiving Master of Arts in political science from University of Illinois at Chicago in 2011. He received his PhD in the same stream from the same university, in 2013.

== Career ==
Maness is an assistant professor at the Defense Analysis Department of Naval Postgraduate School and is a Visiting Fellow of security and resilience studies at the Political Science Department in the Northeastern University.

=== Books ===
He is the co-author of three books:-

- Maness, Ryan; Valeriano, Brandon (2015). Russia's Coercive Diplomacy: Energy, Cyber, and Maritime Policy as New Sources of Power. Basingstoke, U.K.: Palgrave Macmillan. ISBN 9781137479433. OCLC 894935442.
- Maness, Ryan; Valeriano, Brandon (2015). Cyber War versus Cyber Realities: Cyber Conflict in the International System. Oxford, U.K.: Oxford University Press. ISBN 9780190204792. OCLC 898531121.
- Valeriano, Brandon; Jensen, Benjamin M.; Maness, Ryan C. (2018). Cyber strategy : the evolving character of power and coercion. Oxford University Press. ISBN 9780190618094. OCLC 1055861777.

and has contributed a chapter over The Oxford Handbook of U.S. National Security. Oxford Handbooks. Oxford, New York: Oxford University Press. 2018-06-01. ISBN 9780190680015.

In Cyber Wars versus Cyber Realities, he argues that the era of cyberwar has been characterized by "restraint". In the run-up to the 2016 presidential election, he expressed the opinion that Russia would not tamper with US voter machines.

== Reception ==
=== Cyber War Versus Cyber Realities: Cyber Conflict in the International System ===
Francis C. Domingo praised the book in Journal of Information Technology & Politics as a groundbreaking empirical work that provided multiple significant contributions to the literature in international relations. Joe Burton, reviewing for H-Net, declared it to be an essential contribution to the cyber security literature, one that took a meticulous and quantitative approach to dispel the hyperbole of mis-characterization, overstatement, and outright fear-mongering around the locus of cyber-attacks. Julien Nocetti, in International Affairs viewed it as a comprehensive and sobering book. John E. Gudgel, reviewing for Small Wars & Insurgencies, saw the book as providing a new perspective on cyber conflict and praised the authors' construction of a database of cyber incidents and disputes between countries—the Dyadic Cyber Incident and Dispute Dataset (DCID), as one of the first viable attempts to quantify the impact of cyber actions. Overall, he concluded that the authors had built a strong case for cyber policy. Courteney J O’Connor, reviewing for Political Studies Review, extensively praised the book and their construction of a data-set, for the purpose. He considered it to be a well-researched, accessible and referenced text, that brought much needed scrutiny and development to the field of theory around the domain of state-based cyber interactions.

=== Russia’s Coercive Diplomacy: Energy, Cyber, and Maritime Policy as New Sources of Power ===
David W. Rivera, reviewing the book for Perspectives on Politics, judged that it had its moments of brilliance as well as weaknesses. Whilst Rivera praised the authors' knowledge of Russia's foreign policy and found the chapters on cyber warfare and the multilateral diplomacy surrounding ownership of the Arctic Ocean to be excellent, he noted the book to be outdated in light of recent political developments and lacking in an optimal treatment about the efficacy of coercion as a diplomatic tool. He concluded:- "Russia’s Coercive Diplomacy is an impressive piece of social science in many ways, but it is also a work that falls between two stools."

=== Cyber Strategy: The Evolving Character of Power and Coercion ===
The book was subject to mixed reviews Giampiero Giacomello of Perspectives on Politics deemed it an original, well researched, and well-presented book but remarked on its failure to present any unexpected or new information on the subject. He also praised the remarkable literature review of cyberspace present in the book.
