= Elkatawa, Kentucky =

Unincorporated community in Kentucky, United States

Elkatawa
- Unincorporated community
- Location within the state of Kentucky Elkatawa (the United States)
- Coordinates: 37°33′25″N 83°25′37″W
- Country: United States
- State: Kentucky
- County: Breathitt
- Elevation: 738 ft (225 m)
- Time zone: UTC-6 (Central (CST))
  - Summer (DST): UTC-5 (CST)
- GNIS feature ID: 491681

Elkatawa is an unincorporated community and coal town in Breathitt County, Kentucky, United States.

A post office was established in 1891, with Eli C. Jones postmaster. The name Elkatawa is possibly a corruption of Tenskwatawa.
