= William Manon Cornett =

American lawyer (1882–1956)

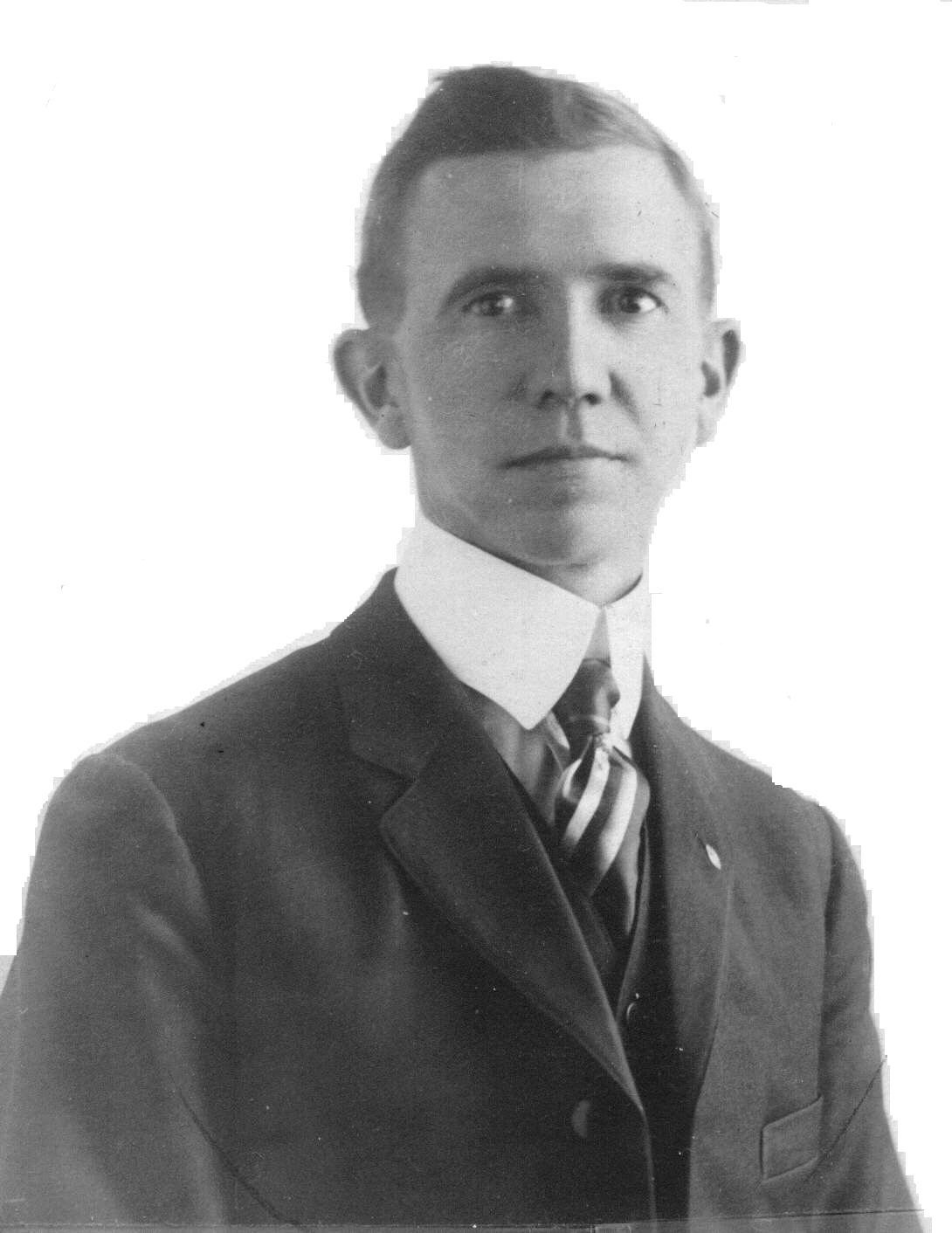
William 'Manon' Cornett as Chief of Staff of Congressman John W. Langley 1912

William "Manon" Cornett was a Kentucky politician and served as Chief of Staff to Congressman John W. Langley from 1912 to 1914. and Deputy Insurance Commissioner for the State of Kentucky from 1921 to 1924.

Manon was born on September 9, 1882, in Cornettsville, Kentucky (near Hazard), and died May 3, 1956.

== Early life ==
Manon Cornett was the eldest child of Eli H. Cornett and Jane Combs Cornett. In 1900 at the age of 18 he was listed as a 'farmer' At 19, he attended the University of Kentucky in Lexington, Kentucky, for one year. In 1903 he married Clara Belle Eversole and had three (3) children: Juanita Nell Cornett (wife of Arch Glass Mainous), Joseph E. Cornett, and Claribel Cornett. Manon's father, Eli H. Cornett, was Sheriff of Perry County, Kentucky.

== Life in Washington, DC ==
In 1912 he was appointed the private secretary (i.e. Chief of Staff) for Congressman John W. Langley and lived in Washington, D.C., at 1801 1st Street, NW though 1915. While in Washington he was involved with an organization called the 'Sons of Jonadab'

== Life in Frankfort, Kentucky ==
After his stint with Congressman Langley, Manon and his family returned to Hazard, Kentucky. Shortly thereafter, he was appointed Deputy Insurance Commissioner by the incoming Republican Governor Edwin P. Morrow, a post he held for 4 years (ending in January 1924). While in Frankfort, he lived at 416 West Main Street. During this period, Manon was published in various news articles discussing various Insurance Matters.

At the Kentucky underwriters meeting held at Frankfort, Kentucky he gave a headline speech on January 13, 1921, that was covered on the front page of The State Journal. Later in the year, he attended the National Association of Insurance Commissioners Annual convention in Louisville, Kentucky, on September 27, 1921.

== After politics ==
Manon left politics in 1924 at the age of 36 returning to Hazard, Kentucky. By trade, he was a lawyer. He died on May 3, 1956, at the Shady Grove Sanitarium in Eminence, Kentucky. He is buried in Hillcrest Memorial Park in Lexington, Kentucky with his family.
