= Ebersole =

Ebersole is a surname of Swiss German origin with the meaning "boar ground". Eversole, Ebersol, and Ebersold are other spellings of this name. Ebersol and Ebersole also occur among Mennonites and the Amish. It may refer to:

- Brian Ebersole (born 1980), American mixed martial arts fighter
- Brian Ebersole (politician) (born 1947), American politician
- Christine Ebersole (born 1953), American actress and singer
- Eric Ebersole (born 1958), American politician
- Frank Ebersole (1919–2009), American poet
- Hal Ebersole (1899–1984), American football player
- John Ebersole (American football) (born 1948), American football player
- John Ebersole (educator) (1944–2016), American educator, writer, and academic administrator
- John H. Ebersole (1925–1993), American pioneer in submarine medicine and radiation oncology
- Kyle Ebersole, American racing driver
- Lucinda Ebersole (1950–2017), American writer
- Mark C. Ebersole (1921–2011), American academic
- P. David Ebersole (born 1964), American film director

== See also ==
- Ebersol
- Ebersold
- Eversole (surname)
