= Tom Ebersold =

American artist (1943–1976)

Thomas G. Ebersold was an artist and the inventor of Contemporary Cloisonné. He was born in Santa Monica, California in 1943 and died in March 1976, from cystic fibrosis. He grew up in Vista, California where his family moved to in 1946, when he was just two. He spent most of his life in Vista, where he attended school, worked and lived for 23 years. Vista was also the place he met his lifelong friend, Margaret Tiefenthaler, who helped and supported him with his artwork. (Note: Sonja Mccoll (Soyland) is the daughter of Margaret Tiefenthaler)

== His Work ==
Ebersold's original art form Contemporary Cloisonné took him ten years of experimentation to perfect. His art was inspired by the Asian art of Cloisonné. Oriental Cloisonné is a process that places tiny wires or strips of either copper, brass, gold or silver in shapes, they then have vitreous enamel placed in between forming the picture for the design. Mr. Ebersold was celebrated throughout the South-west for Contemporary Cloisonné. He began his career in the late 1960s using traditional Oriental Cloisonné and modern materials to produce works of intricate detail and vivid colour. His subjects range from Egyptian and Mayan to South-western themes.

Ebersold would generally use copper wire in his work as he preferred the look of it and it was cheaper than other types of wire. Once he created his work, that included the copper wire, it would be custom framed by The Frame House in Oceanside, California. The frame would then be backed with a simple paper bag. Usually he obtained these from the supermarket; Safeway Inc. He would also attach a tag that gave advice on how to display and look after each piece as well as a small bit of information on the work. Tom Ebersold would spend long periods of time working on each piece, making it perfect. This meant each work of art could take hours, especially with all the small pieces of wire he would include. However this was not a problem because although the majority of the work was done by Ebersold, he had help from Margaret and her two daughters Sonja and Ingrid Soyland. The two young girls enjoyed making what they called petals, to add to Ebersold's work. These petals would be tear drop shapes that are featured in works such as the piece that includes an image of an oriental pot and a quail. The title for this work is unknown.

== The Life and Death of Tom Ebersold ==
Thomas Ebersold went to Vista High School and the University of California. He studied art throughout his high school years and at University. He received a bachelor's degree in design from the University of California. Once he left university he began travelling around the world, gaining ideas and inspiration from the places and cultures he experienced. When he returned to his home to Vista, he began creating his artwork and served as a photographer for The Vista Press. He was a photographer for many years and an artist for many more. He continued his artwork until the end.

Thomas G. Ebersold died at the age of 32 in 1976 from cystic fibrosis, but at the time was the longest living person with the disease.

== Ebersold's Parents ==
Raymond Ebersold was Thomas Ebersold's father and served consecutively on the Historical Society board of directors from 1980 until his voluntary retirement in June 2008. He was honoured for his many years of service at the January 2008 board meeting. Ray left his job with Douglas Aircraft at the end of World War II and with his wife Harriet and son Tom came to Vista in 1946 when, as Ray recalled, “Vista Way was gravel all the way to the ocean.” Ray and Harriet were married in 1940. After World War II, they discovered Vista, “a quiet place with an exceptional climate,” and purchased six acres on Alta Vista Drive at Crescent Drive. They ran the community's largest rabbitry for several years and lived in their Alta Vista Drive home for 26 years. They later moved to a home on Escondido Avenue and then for 27 years lived at Grandview Terrace Mobile Estates on Sycamore Avenue. The couple was active in the Farm Bureau and the Rabbit Club in the 1940s and 1950s, in the Community Church of Vista for many years, and in the 100-member North County Dance Club. They also belonged to the Vista Trailer Club and travelled extensively. Raymond Ebersold is survived by his wife of 69 years, Harriet. Services were held at Community Church on Tuesday, March 23.
