= Submarines of the Imperial Japanese Navy =

Submarine forces of the Imperial Japanese Navy

Imperial Japanese Navy submarines originated with the purchase of five Holland type submarines from the United States in 1904. Japanese submarine forces progressively built up strength and expertise, becoming by the beginning of World War II one of the world's most varied and powerful submarine fleets.

== Origins ==
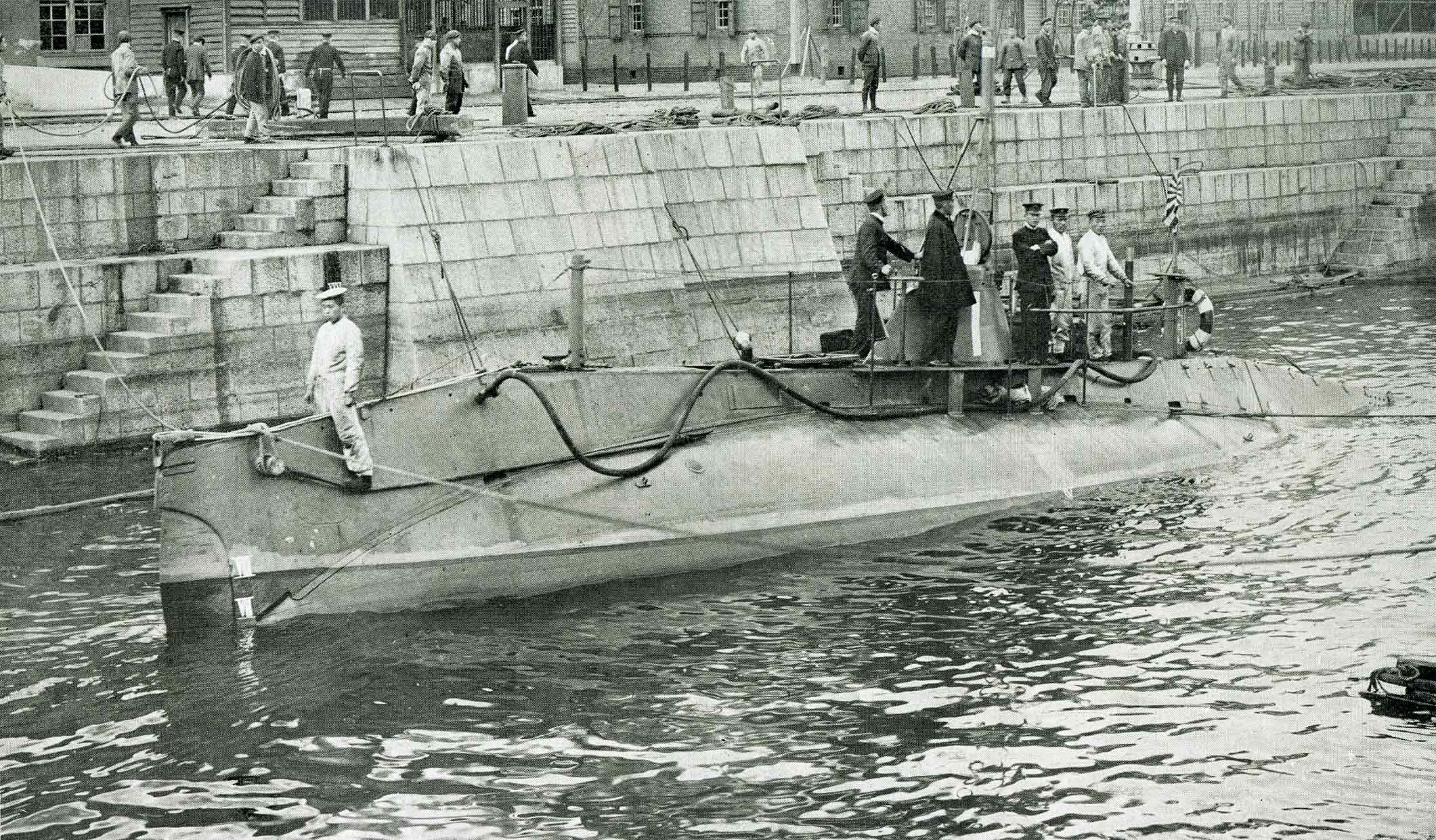
Holland 1-class submarine purchased during the Russo Japanese War

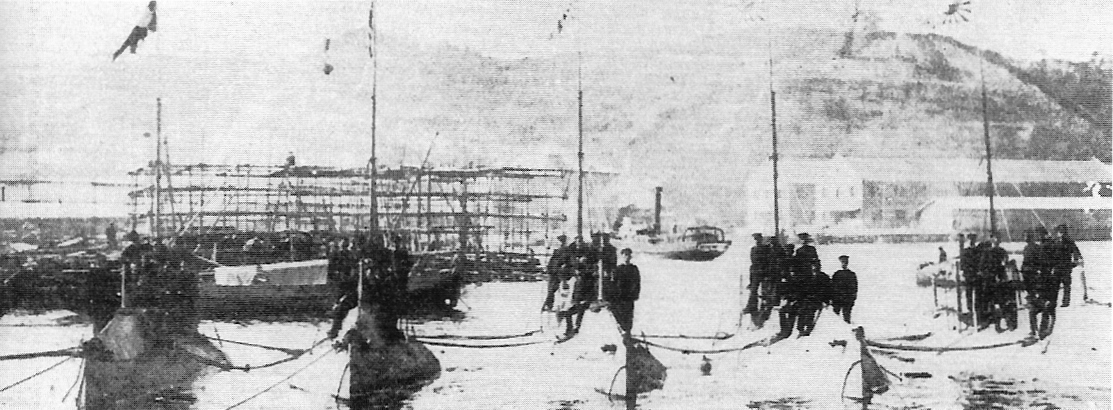
Japan's first fleet of submarines (Nos. 1 to 5, all Holland designs), assembled by Arthur Leopold Busch in the Naval Review of October 1905.

The Imperial Japanese Navy (IJN) acquired its first submarines during the Russo-Japanese War on 12 December 1904 where they arrived in sections at the Yokohama dockyards. The vessels were purchased from the relatively new American company, Electric Boat, and were fully assembled and ready for combat operations by August 1905. However, hostilities with Russia were nearing its end by that date, and no submarines saw action during the war.

The submarines that Electric Boat sold to Japan were based on the Holland designs, known as Holland Type VIIs similar to the American Plunger-class submarines. The five imported Hollands were originally built at Fore River Ship and Engine Company in Quincy, Massachusetts under Busch's direction for the Electric Boat Company back in August–October 1904. They were shipped by freighter from Seattle, Washington in Knock-down kit form to Japan, and then reassembled by Arthur Leopold Busch at the Yokosuka Naval Arsenal, which was then Japan's largest naval shipyard, to become Hulls No. 1 through 5 and were designated Type 1 submarines by the Japanese Navy.

Frank Cable, an electrician who was working for Isaac Rice's Electro-Dynamic and Storage Companies along with Rice's Electric Boat, arrived some six months after Busch, training the IJN in the operation of the newly introduced vessels.

In 1904 Kawasaki Dockyard Company purchased plans for a modified version directly from Holland, and built two boats (Hulls No. 6 and 7), with the help of two American engineers, Chase and Herbert, who had been assistants to Holland. The Kawasaki-type submarines displaced 63 and 95 tons when submerged, and measured 73 and 84 feet (22 and 26 m) in overall length, respectively. Both vessels measured 7 feet (2.1 m) at the beam. This contrasted with the original five imported Hollands-type submarines which had arrived that same year, at over 100 tons submerged, 67 feet (20 m) in overall length and 11 feet (3.4 m) beam. The Kawasaki Type #6 and #7 submarines had gained extra speed and reduced fuel consumption by 1/4. However both boats could launch only one 18-inch (460 mm) torpedo, and each was manned by 14 sailors, whereas the imported Holland-type submarines could fire two torpedoes and could be operated by 13 sailors. This new type was designated the Type 6 submarine by the Imperial Japanese Navy, and was used primarily for test purposes.

The Kaigun Holland #6 was launched at Kobe on 28 September 1905 and was completed six months later at Kure as the first submarine built in Japan. It sank during a training dive in Hiroshima Bay on 15 April 1910. Although the water was only 58 feet (18 m) deep, there were no provisions at all for the crew to escape while submerged. The commanding officer, Lieutenant Tsutomu Sakuma, patiently wrote a description of his sailor's efforts to bring the boat back to the surface as their oxygen supply ran out. All of the sailors were later found dead at their duty stations when this submarine was raised the following day. The sailors were regarded as heroes for their calm performance of their duties until death, and this submarine was preserved as a memorial in Kure until the end of World War II.

Although the capabilities of these first submarines were never tested in combat during the Russo-Japanese War, the first submarine squadron was soon formed at Kure Naval District in the Inland Sea. Following the war, the Japanese government followed submarine developments by the Royal Navy with interest, and purchased two British C-class submarines directly from Vickers, with an additional three built from kits by the Kure Naval Arsenal. These became respectively the Japanese Ha-1-class and Ha-3-class submarines. An additional two vessels, forming the Ha-7 class were later built by the Kure Naval Arsenal.

In 1909, the first submarine tender, Karasaki, was commissioned.

== World War I ==
Japan, along with the rest of the Allies, drew heavily upon Germany's Guerre de Course (commerce raiding) operations during the First World War, and their submarine successes reinforced Japan's willingness to develop this weapon, resulting in eighteen ocean-going submarines being included in its 1917 expansion program. Japan received nine German submarines as World War I reparations, which allowed her and the other Allies to accelerate their technological developments during the interwar period.

== World War II ==
Imperial Japanese Navy (IJN) submarines formed by far the most varied fleet of submarines of World War II, including manned torpedoes (Kaiten), midget submarines (Kō-hyōteki, Kairyū), medium-range submarines, purpose-built supply submarines (many used by the Imperial Japanese Army, see Type 3), fleet submarines (many of which carried an aircraft), submarines with the highest submerged speeds of the conflict (Sentaka I-201-class), and submarines able to carry multiple bombers (World War II's largest submarine, the Sentoku I-400-class). They were also equipped with the advanced oxygen-fuelled Type 95 Torpedo (which are sometimes confused with the famed Type 93 Long Lance torpedo). Overall, despite their advanced technical innovation, Japanese submarines were built in relatively small numbers, and had less effect on the war than those of the other major navies.

Paul Wenneker, the German naval attaché in Japan, suggested that Japanese submarines be used to attack American supply ships traveling between the U.S. West Coast and Hawaii, as Germany's U-boats were doing in the Atlantic. The Japanese rejected his advice, believing that submarines should only be used to attack U.S. Navy warships. The Imperial Japanese Navy's doctrine of fleet warfare (guerre d'escadre) resulted in its submarines seldom posing a threat to allied merchant convoys and shipping lanes, in contrast to the Kriegsmarine's U-boats who pursued commerce raiding against Allied and neutral merchant ships. During the war, IJN submarines sunk only about 1 million tons (GRT) of merchant shipping (184 ships) in the Pacific; by contrast U.S. Navy submarines sank 5.2 million tons (1,314 ships) in the same period, while U-boats of Nazi Germany's Kriegsmarine, the IJN's Axis partner, sank 14.3 million tons (2,840 ships) in the Atlantic and other oceans.

The IJN pursued the doctrine of guerre d'escadre (fleet vs fleet warfare), and consequently submarines were often used in offensive roles against warships. Warships were more difficult to attack and sink than merchant ships, however, because naval vessels were faster, more maneuverable, and better defended. Nonetheless, the IJN submarine arm did have a number of notable successes against US Navy warships during the first year of the Pacific War, at a time when American production of new warships had not caught up. During this time, US Navy submarines achieved few major Japanese warship kills, being led by timid and unproductive submarine skippers, as well as being equipped with unreliable torpedoes that either ran too deep or had faulty triggers.

However, as fuel oil diminished and air superiority was lost, Japanese submarines were no longer able to continue with such successes. Once the United States was able to increase its production of destroyers and destroyer escorts, as well as bringing over highly effective anti-submarine techniques learned during the Battle of the Atlantic, they took a heavy toll upon Japanese submarines. Early models of IJN submarines were relatively less maneuverable under water, could not dive very deeply (compared to Kriegsmarine U-boats), and lacked radar. Later in the war, Japanese submarines that were fitted with radar were in some instances sunk due to the ability of American radar sets to detect their emissions. For example, USS Batfish sank three such IJN submarines near Japan in just four days).

During the last two years of the War in the Pacific, many IJN submarines were also pressed into service delivering supplies to isolated island garrisons, ones that had been deliberately bypassed by the Americans and the Australians island-hopping campaign. These Japanese-held island bases could not be reached by surface transports because of blockades by Allied warplanes and naval vessels, however Japanese submarines in this role were generally inefficient as they could only transport a fraction of the goods that could be carried by surface ships.

After the end of the conflict, several of Japan's most innovative and advanced submarines were sent to Hawaii for inspection in "Operation Road's End" (I-400, I-401, I-201, and I-203) before being scuttled by the U.S. Navy in 1946 when the Soviet Union demanded access to the IJN submarines.

=== Successes against Allied warships ===
Twice in the first year of the war, Japanese submarines torpedoed the aircraft carrier USS Saratoga, and, while not sinking her, put her in the repair yard at a time when the US Navy could ill afford to do without her. Saratoga was torpedoed by submarine I-6 on January 11, 1942, putting her out of action and unavailable to participate in the desperate carrier battles and raids of the next five months, and then hit again three months after her return on September 1, 1942, by I-26, which put her out of action for another eleven weeks in the middle of the intensely engaged land-air-sea battles of the Guadalcanal Campaign.

During the Battle of Midway, I-168 administered the final coup de grace that sank the crippled fleet carrier USS Yorktown, as well as sinking the destroyer USS Hammann. A few months later, on September 15, 1942, with a single salvo of torpedoes, Japanese submarine I-19 sank the fleet carrier USS Wasp and damaged both the battleship USS North Carolina and the destroyer USS O'Brien. On November 13, 1942, the submarine I-26 torpedoed and sank the anti-aircraft cruiser USS Juneau, and a year later on November 23, 1943, the submarine I-175 torpedoed and sank the escort carrier USS Liscome Bay, both with heavy loss of life. The I-176 had the distinction of both severely damaging the heavy cruiser USS Chester, knocking her out of the war for a year, on October 20, 1942, and of also sinking USS Corvina (the only American submarine to be sunk by a Japanese submarine in the entire war) on November 16, 1943.

The Japanese submarine arm had few notable successes against Allied warships during the final two years of the war. One victory was the I-41 knocking the anti-aircraft cruiser USS Reno out for the rest of the war with a torpedo hit on November 3, 1944 (this was the first time in almost two years that a Japanese submarine had successfully attacked an Allied ship operating with a fast carrier task force). On July 30, 1945, just two weeks before the Japanese surrender, I-58 torpedoed and sank the heavy cruiser USS Indianapolis, with heavy loss of life, at a time when few in the United States Navy expected continued Japanese submarine attacks.

=== Submarine aircraft carriers ===
The Japanese applied the concept of the "submarine aircraft carrier" extensively, starting with the J3 type of 1937–38. Altogether 41 submarines were built with the capability to carry seaplanes. Most IJN submarine aircraft carriers could carry only one aircraft, but I-14 had hangar space for two, and the giant I-400 class, three.

=== Attacks upon continental USA ===
A plane launched from one of the innovative aircraft-carrying submarines, I-25, conducted what remains the only ever aerial bombing attack on the continental United States, when Warrant Flying Officer Nobuo Fujita piloting a Yokosuka E14Y scouting plane dropped four 168-pound bombs in an attempt to start forest fires outside the town of Brookings, Oregon, on September 9, 1942. Earlier in the year, in February 1942, the submarine I-17 fired a number of shells from her deck gun at the Elwood Oil Fields near Santa Barbara, California. None of the shells caused any serious damage.

=== Yanagi missions ===
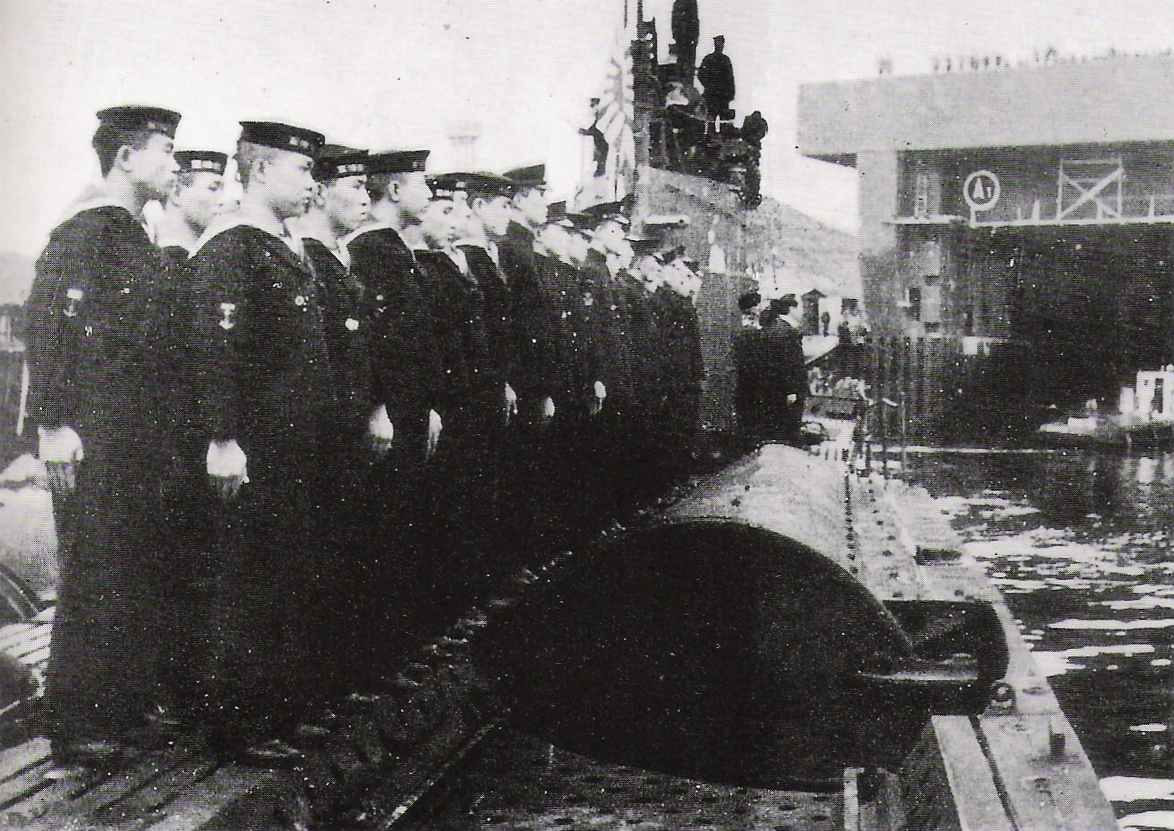
I-8 arriving in Brest, France, in 1943.

Yanagi missions were enabled under the Axis Powers' Tripartite Pact to provide for an exchange of key personnel, technology, strategic materials, and manufactured goods between Germany, Italy, and Japan. Initially, cargo ships made the exchanges, but when this was no longer possible, submarines were used under Wenneker's direction. The submarines had to pass through the Atlantic, Indian, and Pacific Oceans, and many of the submarines were lost during the journey with their entire cargo and passengers.

Only six submarines attempted this trans-oceanic voyage during World War II: I-30 (mid-June to August 1942), I-8 (June 1943), I-34 (October 1943), I-29 (November 1943), and German submarines U-511 (August 1943) and U-864 (December 1944). Of these, I-30 was partially successful but was later sunk by a mine, I-8 completed her mission, I-34 was sunk by British submarine Taurus, and I-29 by the United States submarine, Sawfish (assisted by Ultra intelligence). I-52 made the final attempt.

Wenneker believed that Japanese submarines were inferior to German U-boats, being too large to be maneuverable and having worse radar capabilities. On Wenneker's initiative, Hitler eventually agreed to send two Kriegsmarine U-boats to Japan for the Japanese to be able to study their technology. The first, U-511, arrived in Japan in the summer of 1943 and was examined before being used as a training ship. The Japanese believed the German U-boat was too complicated for them to build more in their shipyards. The second German submarine, U-1224, was used by a Japanese crew that had traveled to Germany and spent several months being trained by the Kriegsmarine there on German submarine operations and tactics, but they were lost when the submarine was destroyed on its way to Japan in the spring of 1944 by a U.S. anti-submarine hunter-killer group.

== Submarine types ==
=== First-class submarines ===
This class includes the largest of Japanese submarines, characterized by great size and range.

==== Type KD1 (I-51) ====
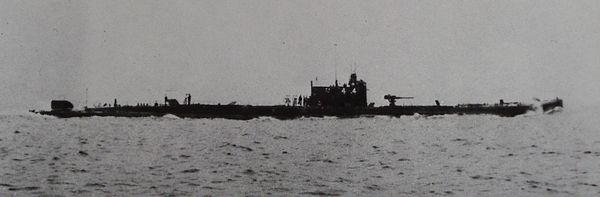
Type KD1 submarine Submarine No. 44 (later I-51).

The Kaidai I type (海大I型, Navy large type I) (I-51-class) submarine was the prototype for the types (KD2-KD7) that followed and was based on the German cruiser submarine U-139 and the British L-class submarine.

- I-51 – Hulked on 1 April 1940 as Haikan No. 3 or Haisen No. 3. Sold and scrapped in 1941.

==== Type KD2 (I-152) ====
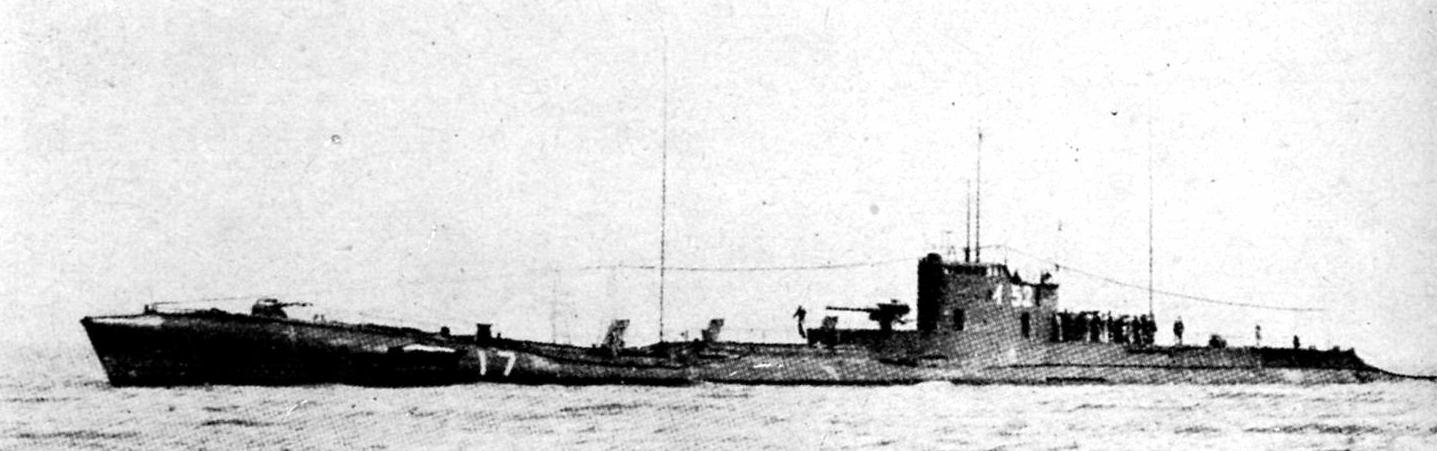
Type KD2 submarine I-52 (later I-152).

The Kaidai II type (海大II型, Navy large type II) (I-152-class) submarine was based on U-139 and the British K-class submarine.

- I-52/I-152 – Decommissioned in 1942 and served as training hulk Haikan No. 14. Scrapped 1946–1948 at Kure.

==== Type KD3a (4 units) ====
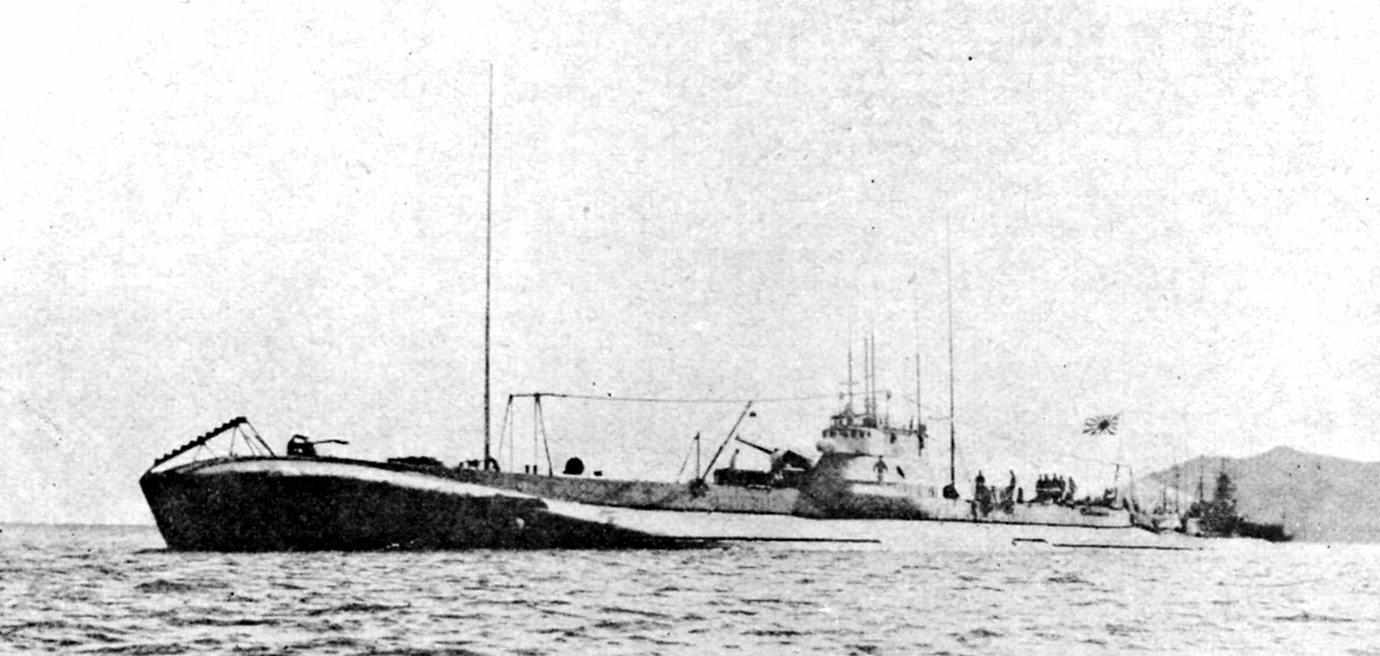
Type KD3a submarine I-55 (later I-155).

The Kaidai IIIa type (海大IIIa型, Navy large type IIIa) (I-153-class) submarines were similar to the Type KD1 and KD2 but with strengthened hulls. In 1945, I-155 and I-158 were modified as Kaiten suicide torpedo carriers, each armed with two kaitens.

- I-53/I-153 – sank Ben 2 on 20 February in the Indian Ocean, SS Moesi in the Bali Strait on 27 February 1942 and SS City of Manchester off Java on 28 February 1942. I-153 herself was sunk as a target by HMAS Quiberon and HMIS Sutlej in the Seto Inland Sea on 8 May 1946 as part of Operation Bottom, although some sources claim she was scrapped in 1948 rather than sunk.
- I-54/I-154 – scuttled by gunfire from HMAS Quiberon and HMIS Sutlej in the Seto Island Sea on May 8, 1946 as part of Operation Bottom.
- I-55/I-155 – sank SS Van Cloon off Java on 7 February 1942 and RMS Derrymore in the Java Sea on February 13, 1942. I-155 herself surrendered 2 September 1945 and was scuttled by gunfire from HMAS Quiberon and HMIS Sutlej in the Seto Island Sea on May 8, 1946 as part of Operation Bottom.
- I-58/I-158 – sank SS Langkoeas in the Java Sea on 3 January 1942, SS Camphuys off Bawean Island on 9 January 1942, SS Pijnacker Hordijk between Tjilatjap and Padang on 22 February 1942 and SS Boeroe south of the Sunda Strait on 25 February 1942. I-158 herself surrendered on 2 September 1945 and was scuttled off the Gotō Islands on 1 April 1946 as part of Operation Road's End.

==== Type KD3b (3 units) ====
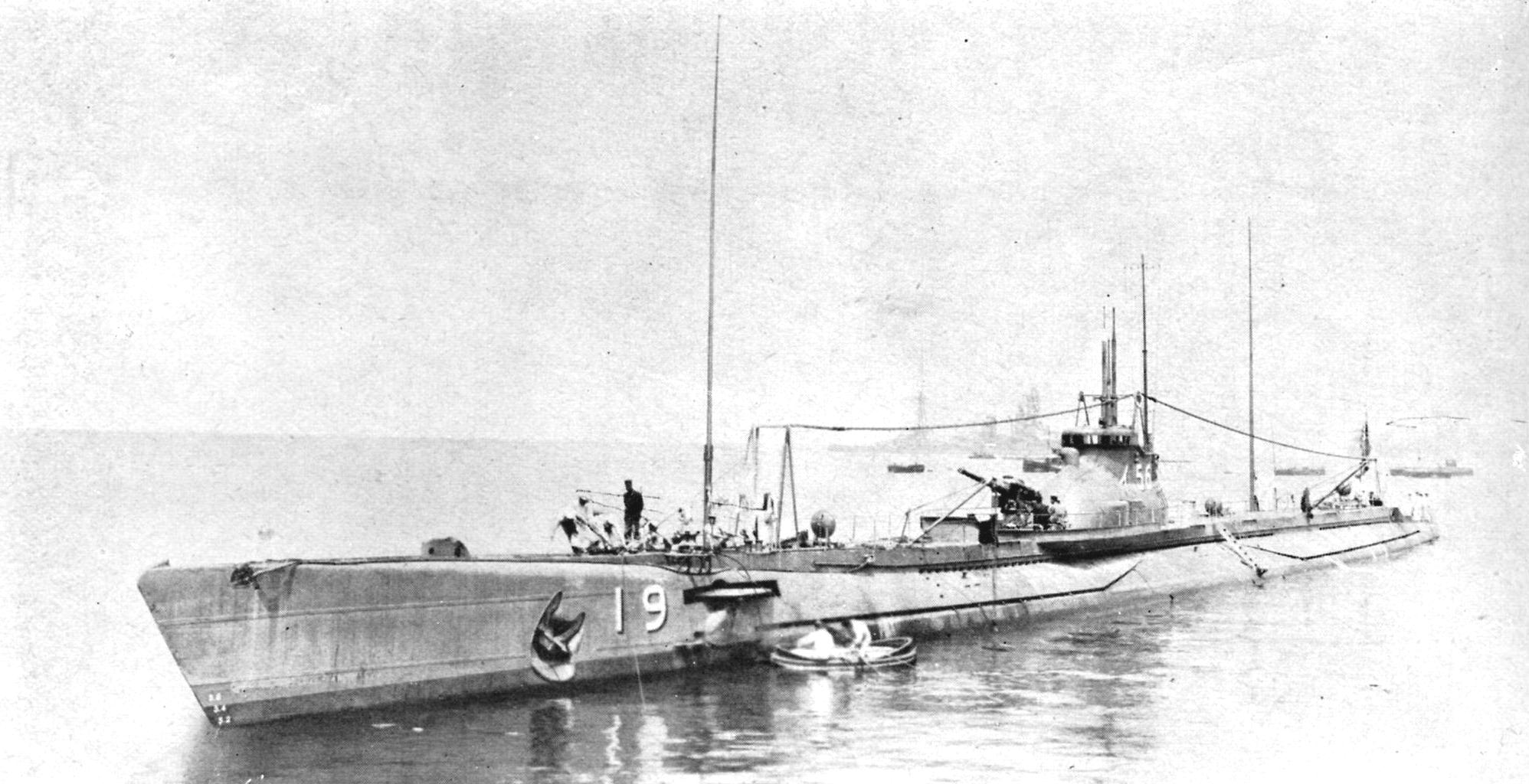
Type KD3b submarine I-56 (later I-156).

The Kaidai IIIb type (海大IIIb型, Navy large type IIIb) (I-156-class) submarines were similar to the Type KD3a but were 16 inches longer and had a different bow shape.

- I-56/I-156 – sank five merchant ships. I-156 surrendered on 2 September 1945 and was scuttled off the Gotō Islands on 1 April 1946 by USS Nereus as part of Operation Road's End.
- I-57/I-157 – sank SS Djirak on 7 January 1942. I-157 surrendered on 2 September 1945 and scuttled off the Gotō Islands on 1 April 1946 by USS Nereus as part of Operation Road's End.
- I-59/I-159 – sank SS Rooseboom off Sumatra on March 1, 1942. I-159 surrendered on September 2, 1945 and scuttled off the Gotō Islands on 1 April 1946 by USS Nereus as part of Operation Road's End.
- I-60 – Accidentally rammed I-63 off Mizunoko Light on 2 February 1939. I-60 herself was sunk off Krakatoa Island on 17 January 1942 by HMS Jupiter.
- I-63 – Accidentally rammed by I-60 off Mizunoko Light on 2 February 1939. Refloated January 1940 and then scrapped.

==== Type KD4 (3 units) ====
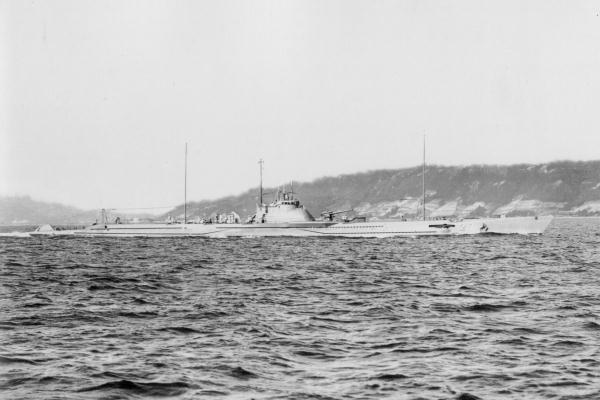
Type KD4 submarine I-64 (later I-164).

The Kaidai IV type (海大IV型, Navy large type IV) (I-61/I-162-class) submarines were slightly smaller and had four torpedo tubes, but were otherwise similar to the Type KD3.

- I-61 – Sunk in collision with gunboat Kiso Maru in Koshiki Channel on 2 October 1941. Refloated in early 1942 and sold for scrap.
- I-62/I-162 – Sank Mikoyan on 3 October 1942, Manon on 7 October 1942 and Fort McCloud on 22 February 1944. The I-162 herself surrendered on 2 September 1945 and scuttled off the Gotō Islands on 1 April 1946 by USS Nereus as part of Operation Road's End.
- I-64/I-164 – Sunk off Cape Ashizuri on 17 May 1942 by USS Triton.

==== Type KD5 (3 units) ====
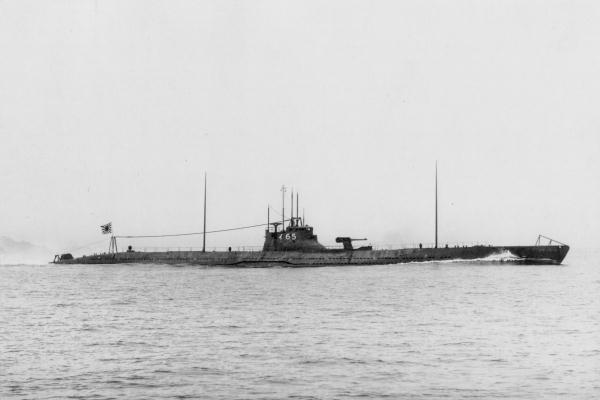
Type KD5 submarine I-65 (later I-165).

The Kaidai V type (海大V型, Navy large type V) (I-165-class) submarines were similar to the Type KD4 but had an improved operating depth.

- I-65/I-165 – Depth-charged off Saipan on 27 June 1945 by a US Navy patrol bomber of VPB-142.
- I-66/I-166 – Sunk off One Fathom Bank on 17 July 1944 by HMS Telemachus.
- I-67 – Sank in diving accident off Minamitorishima on 29 August 1940.

==== Type KD6a (6 units) ====
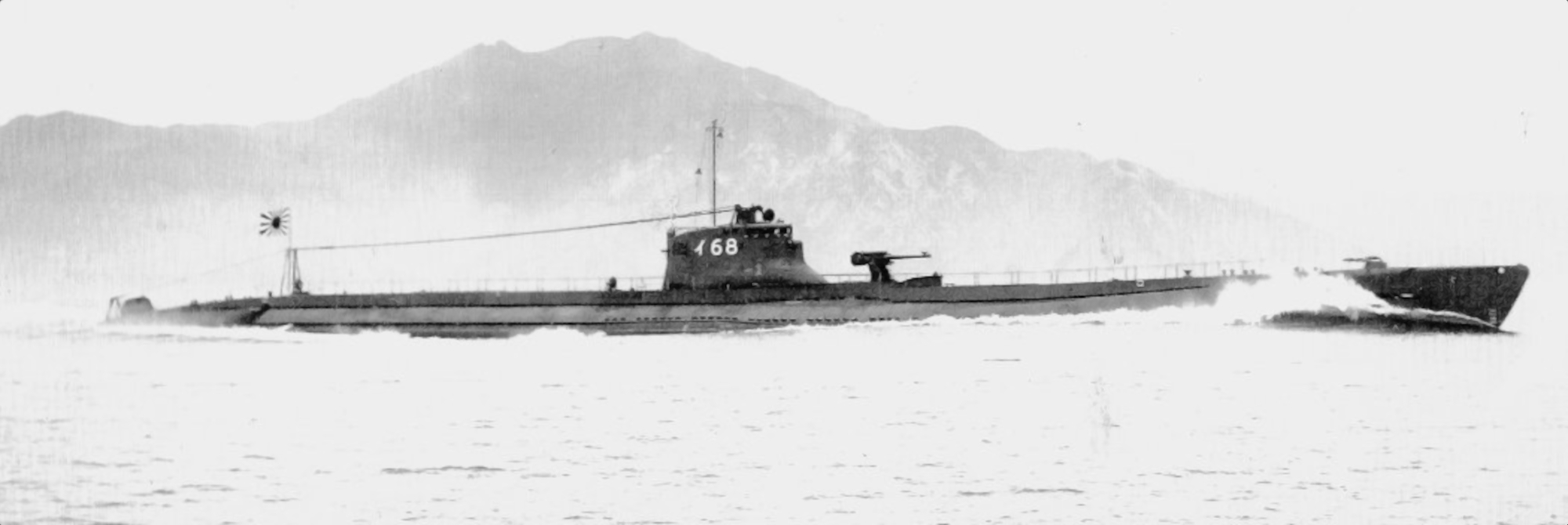
Type KD6a submarine I-68 (later I-168).

The Kaidai VIa type (海大VIa型, Navy large type VIa) (I-168-class) submarines were similar to the KD5 but with a higher speed.

- I-68/I-168 – Sunk in the Steffen Strait on 27 July 1943 by USS Scamp.
- I-69/I-169 – Sank in diving accident in Truk Lagoon on 4 April 1944.
- I-70 – Sunk by a Douglas SBD Dauntless aircraft from VS-6 (USS Enterprise) on 10 December 1941. This was the first enemy combatant ship sunk by U.S. forces.
- I-71/I-171 – Depth-charged off Buka Island on 1 February 1944 by USS Guest and USS Hudson.
- I-72/I-172 – Missing after 28 October 1942. Possibly depth-charged off San Cristóbal by USS McCalla on 3 November 1942.
- I-73 – Sunk by USS Gudgeon on 27 January 1942. I-73 was the first warship sunk by a US Navy submarine.

==== Type KD6b (2 units) ====
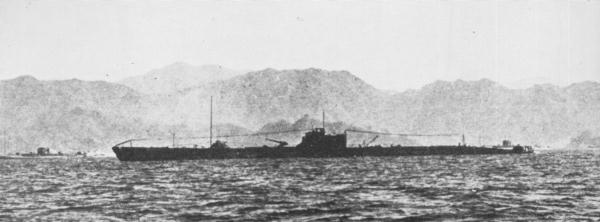
Type KD6b submarine I-75 (later I-175).

The Kaidai VIb type (海大VIb型, Navy large type VIb) (I-174-class) submarines were similar to the KD6a but were one foot longer and 25 tons heavier.

- I-174 – sunk off Truk on 12 April 1944 by aircraft from VB-108.
- I-175 – sunk off Wotje Atoll on 17 February 1944 by USS Nicholas.

==== Type KD7 (10 units) ====
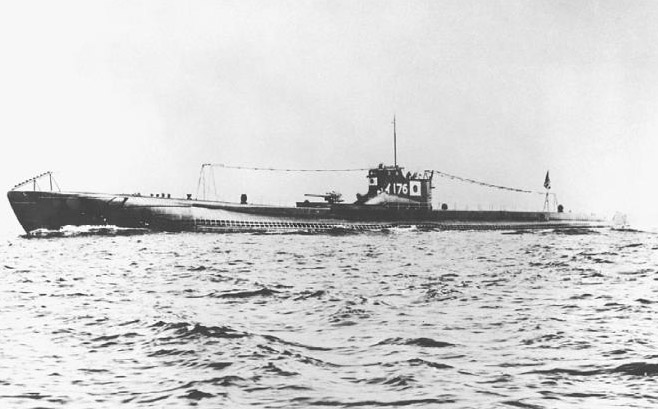
Type KD7 submarine I-176.

The Kaidai VII type (海大VII型, Navy large type VII) or Shin Kaidai type (新海大型, New navy large type) (I-176-class) submarines were similar to the KD6 but with the torpedo tubes moved forward and a slightly improved operating depth.

- I-76/I-176 – sank USS Corvina patrolling off Truk on 16 November 1943, the only known Japanese submarine success against a US submarine – USS Snook was a probable second victim by Japanese submarines. I-176 was lost a year later off Buka Island on 16 May 1944, depth-charged by USS Franks, USS Haggard, and USS Johnston.
- I-177 – Sank AHS Centaur off Australia on 14 May 1943. The I-177 herself is sunk by USS Samuel S. Miles on 3 October 1944.
- I-78/I-178 – Missing after 17 June 1943. Likely sunk 17 June 1943 off Coffs Harbour by three Bristol Beauforts of No. 32 Squadron or possibly sunk on 25 August 1943 near the Solomon Islands by USS Patterson.
- I-79/I-179 – Sank during sea trials in the Seto Island Sea on 14 July 1943. Salvaged 1956-1957 and then scrapped.
- I-80/I-180 – Sunk off Chirikof Island on 27 April 1944 by USS Gilmore.
- I-81/I-181 – Missing after 13 January 1944. Probably depth-charged and sunk in the Vitiaz Strait on 16 January 1944 by an unidentified American destroyer and PT boat.
- I-82/I-182 – Missing after 22 August 1943. Likely sunk off the New Hebrides on 1 September 1943 by USS Wadsworth.
- I-83/I-183 – Sunk near the Bondo Strait on 29 April 1944 by USS Pogy.
- I-84/I-184 – Sunk near Saipan on 19 June 1944 by a torpedo bomber from USS Suwanee.
- I-85/I-185 – Sunk near Saipan on 22 June 1944 by USS Newcomb and USS Chandler.

==== Type J1 (I-1, I-2, I-3, I-4) ====
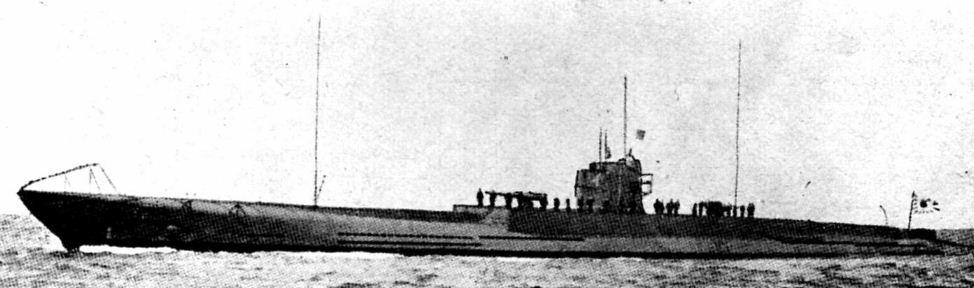
Junsen I-type submarine I-1

The Junsen I type (巡潜I型, Cruiser submarine Type I) (I-1-class) submarines were based on the Kaidai II (Type KD2) and German submarine U-142.

- I-1 – sank SS Siantar off Western Australia on March 3, 1942. I-1 herself was attacked by HMNZS Kiwi and ran aground on Fish Reef January 29, 1943; valuable codes and code books from the wreck are salvaged by Allied forces.
- I-2 – sank HMS Nam Yong off Christmas Island on February 28, 1942, and SS Parigi in the Indian Ocean on March 1, 1942. I-2 herself was sunk in the Bismarck Sea on April 7, 1944, by USS Saufley.
- I-3 – sunk December 9, 1942 near Kamimbo Bay by PT-59.
- I-4 – sank Høegh Merchant off Oahu December 14, 1941, Ban Ho Guan off Bali February 28, 1942 and USS Washingtonian off Eight Degree Channel April 6, 1942. I-4 herself was sunk in St. George's Channel on December 21, 1942, by USS Seadragon.

==== Type J1 Mod. (I-5) ====
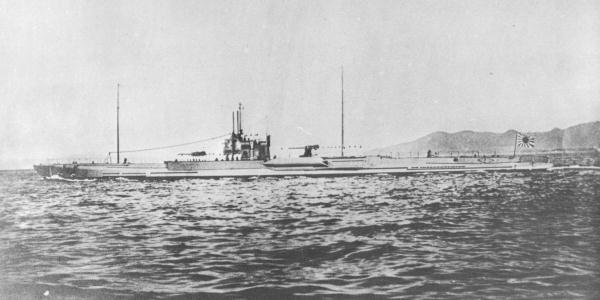
Junsen I Mod-type submarine I-5

The Junsen I Modified type (巡潜I型改, Cruiser submarine Type I Modified) (I-5-class) submarine was similar to the Type J1, but with facilities for one aircraft.

- I-5 – possibly sunk 19 July 1944 off Guam by USS Wyman.

==== Type J2 (I-6) ====
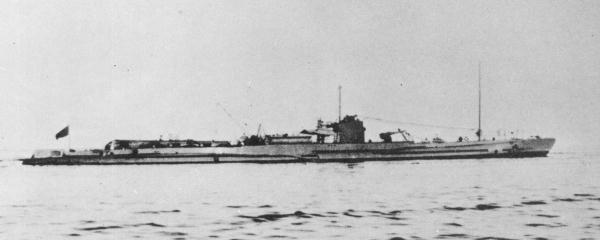
Junsen II-type submarine I-6

The Junsen II type (巡潜II型, Cruiser submarine Type II) (I-6-class) submarine was similar to the I-5 class, but with a catapult for aircraft.

- I-6 – sank Clan Ross in the Arabian Sea on April 2, 1942, and Bahadur in the Arabian Sea on April 7, 1942. I-6 herself was accidentally rammed and sunk 16 June 1944 off Hachijō-jima by Toyokawa Maru.

==== Type J3 (I-7, I-8) ====
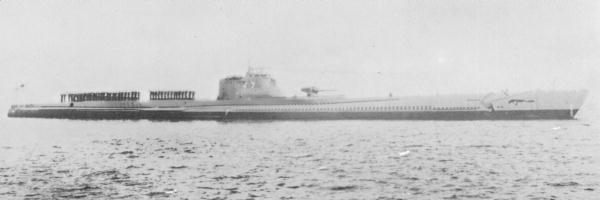
Junsen III-type submarine I-7

The Junsen III type (巡潜III型, Cruiser submarine Type III) (I-7-class) submarines combined the benefits of the Type J2 and the Kaidai V (KD5). This type later led to the Type A, Type B, and Type C submarines.

- I-7 – sank Merkus off Cocos Island on March 4, 1942, Glenshiel in the Indian Ocean on April 3, 1942, and USS Arcata off Unalaska on July 14, 1942. I-7 herself was damaged by gunfire off Kiska June 22, 1943 from USS Monaghan and ran aground on the Twin Rocks and was scuttled on June 23.
- I-8 – sank Tjisalak on March 26, 1944 in the Indian Ocean and Jean Nicolet in May 1944. I-8 herself is sunk off Okinawa on March 31, 1945, by USS Morrison.

==== Type A1 (I-9, I-10, I-11) ====
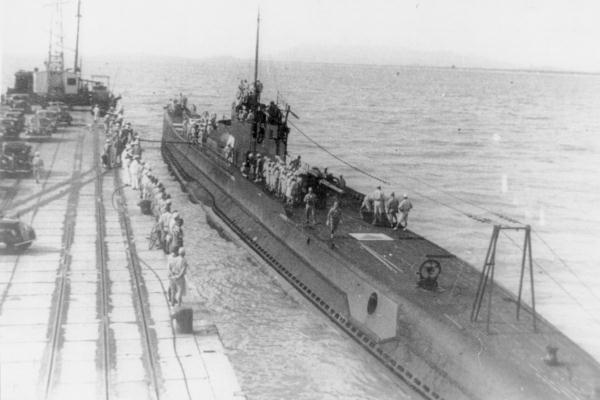
Type A submarine I-10

The Type A or Junsen Type A type (甲型 or 巡潜甲型, (Cruiser submarine) Type A) (I-9-class) submarines were large seaplane-carrying submarines, with communication facilities to allow them to operate as command ships for groups of submarines. The type was also equipped with a hangar for one aircraft.

- I-9 – sunk June 14, 1943 off Kiska by USS Frazier.
- I-10 – sunk July 4, 1944 off Saipan by USS David W. Taylor and USS Riddle.
- I-11 – Missing south of Funafuti after January 11, 1944. Possibly struck a mine laid by USS Terror.

==== Type AM1/A2 (I-12) ====
The Type A Modified 1 or Junsen Type A Modified 1 type (甲型改一 or 巡潜甲型改一, (Cruiser submarine) Type A Modified 1) (I-12-class) submarine was similar to the Type A1, but with less powerful engines, giving the type slower surface speed but a longer range.

- I-12 – sunk November 13, 1944 by USS Ardent and USS Rockford.

==== Type AM2/A3 (I-13, I-14) ====
The Type A Modified 2 or Junsen Type A Modified 2 type (甲型改二 or 巡潜甲型改二, (Cruiser submarine) Type A Modified 2) (Type A Mod.2, I-13-class) submarines was a large seaplane-carrying submarine, with hangar space for two aircraft. These giant submarines were originally of the A2 type, but following the cancellation of a number of I-400-class submarines, their design was revised after construction started to carry a second aircraft. The seaplanes were to be the Aichi M6A1 bomber carrying 800 kg bombs. The range and speed of these submarines was remarkable, 21,000 nmi (39,000 km; 24,000 mi) at 16 knots (30 km/h; 18 mph), but their underwater performance was compromised, making them easy targets.

- I-13 — Sunk 16 July 1945 by USS Lawrence C. Taylor and aircraft from USS Anzio about 550 miles (890 km) east of Yokosuka. With 140 dead, the crew of I-13 was the largest loss of life in the IJN submarine force during WWII.
- I-14 – Surrendered 27 August 1945. Sunk as target 28 May 1946 off Oahu by USS Bugara, reportedly to prevent it from falling into Soviet hands. Wreck found in 2009.

==== Type B1 (20 units) ====
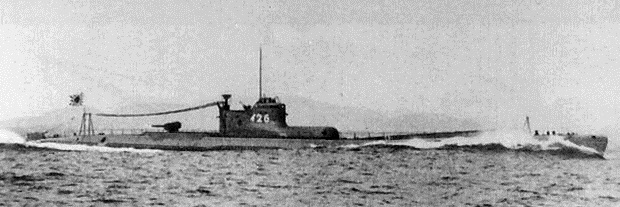
Type B1 submarine I-26.

The Type B or Junsen B type (乙型 or 巡潜乙型, (Cruiser submarine) Type B) (I-15-class) submarines were the most numerous type of submarines of the Imperial Japanese Navy during World War II. In total 20 were made, starting with I-15, the class ship. These were fast, very long ranged, and carried a single Yokosuka E14Y seaplane, located in a hangar in front of the conning tower, launched by a catapult.

The series was rather successful, especially at the beginning of the war. I-26, in 1942, crippled the aircraft carrier USS Saratoga. I-19, on 15 September 1942, fired six torpedoes at aircraft carrier USS Wasp, three of which hit the carrier and sank her, the remainder damaging the battleship USS North Carolina and the destroyer USS O'Brien (which sank later); I-25 conducted the only aerial bombing to occur on the continental United States during World War II. On 9 September 1942, I-25 launched its reconnaissance plane, a Yokosuka E14Y code named Glen which proceeded to drop four 168 pound bombs in a forest near present-day Brookings, Oregon. Several of these ships also undertook "Yanagi" missions to Europe (I-30, I-34, I-29).

- I-15 – Sunk 10 November 1942 by USS Southard.
- I-17 – Sunk 19 August 1943 by HMNZS Tui and US Navy Kingfisher aircraft.
- I-19 – Sank USS Wasp and USS O'Brien on 15 September 1942 and SS William K. Vanderbilt on 16 May 1943. The I-19 herself was depth-charged on 25 November 1943 by USS Radford.
- I-21 – Sank SS Montebello on 23 December 1941, possibly sank USS Porter on 26 October 1942, SS Kalingo on 17 January 1943, SS Iron Knight on 8 February 1943, Mobilube on 18 January 1943, Starr King on 11 February 1943 and Cape San Juan on 12 November 1943. The I-21 herself was missing after 27 November 1943; possibly sunk off Tarawa by TBF Avengers on 29 November 1943.
- I-23 – Missing off Oahu after 24 February 1942, likely due to a diving accident.
- I-25 – Sunk 3 September 1943 off the New Hebrides by one or more US destroyers.
- I-26 – Sank seven cargo ships, including the SS Cynthia Olson, the first US ship sunk after their entry into WWII. Crippled aircraft carrier USS Saratoga, and most famously finished off the already crippled light cruiser USS Juneau, killing the five Sullivan brothers. Sunk 26 October 1944 off Leyte by USS Coolbaugh or USS Richard M. Rowell.
- I-27 – Sunk 12 February 1944 by HMS Paladin and HMS Petard.
- I-28 – Sunk 6 February 1942 by USS Tautog.
- I-29 – Sank six cargo and merchant ships and successfully completed several Yanagi missions. Sunk 26 July 1944 by USS Sawfish
- I-30 – Sunk by a mine near Singapore on 8 October 1942. Salvaged between August 1959 and February 1960 and then scrapped.
- I-31 – Sunk 13 May 1943 by USS Frazier.
- I-32 – Missing after 23 March 1944. Possibly sunk on 24 March 1944 by USS Manlove.
- I-33 – Sank at Truk 26 September 1942. Refloated 29 December 1942. Sank again 13 June 1944 in the Seto Inland Sea during trials. Salvaged between 23 July and 18 August 1953 and then scrapped.
- I-34 – Sunk in the Malacca Straits by HMS Taurus. Salvaged in 1962.
- I-35 – Rammed and sunk 23 November 1943 by USS Frazier.
- I-36 – Blown up and scuttled off the Gotō Islands on 1 April 1946 along with Ha-106 as part of Operation Road's End.
- I-37 – Sunk 19 November 1944 off Palau by USS Conklin and USS McCoy Reynolds.
- I-38 – Missing after 7 November 1944. Possibly depth-charged on 13 November 1944 by USS Nicholas.
- I-39 – Missing after 25 November 1943. Possibly sunk on 26 November 1943 by USS Boyd.

==== Type B2 (6 units) ====
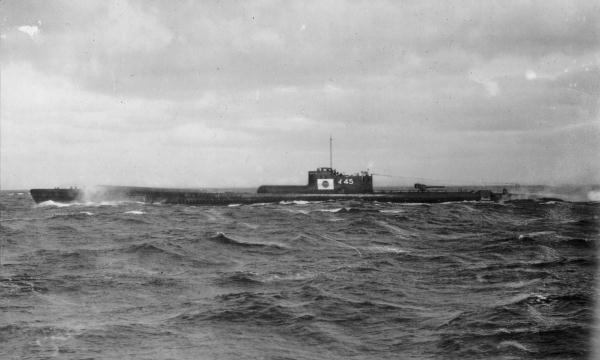
Type B2 submarine I-45.

The Type B Modified 1 or Junsen Type B Modified 1 type (乙型改一 or 巡潜乙型改一, (Cruiser submarine) Type B Modified 1) (I-40-class) submarines were externally similar to the Type B1, but with a high-tensile strength steel hull and diesel engines of a simpler design. In 1944, I-44 was modified as a Kaiten suicide torpedo carrier, armed with six kaitens.

- I-40 – Missing off the Gilbert Islands after 22 November 1943.
- I-41 – Sunk 18 November 1944 by USS Lawrence C. Taylor.
- I-42 – Sunk 23 March 1944 by USS Tunny.
- I-43 – Sunk 15 February 1944 by USS Aspro.
- I-44 – Missing off Okinawa after 4 April 1945. Possibly sunk off Okinawa by a TBM Avenger of VC-92 on 29 April 1945.
- I-45 – Sunk 29 October 1944 by USS Whitehurst.

==== Type B3 (I-54, I-56, I-58) ====
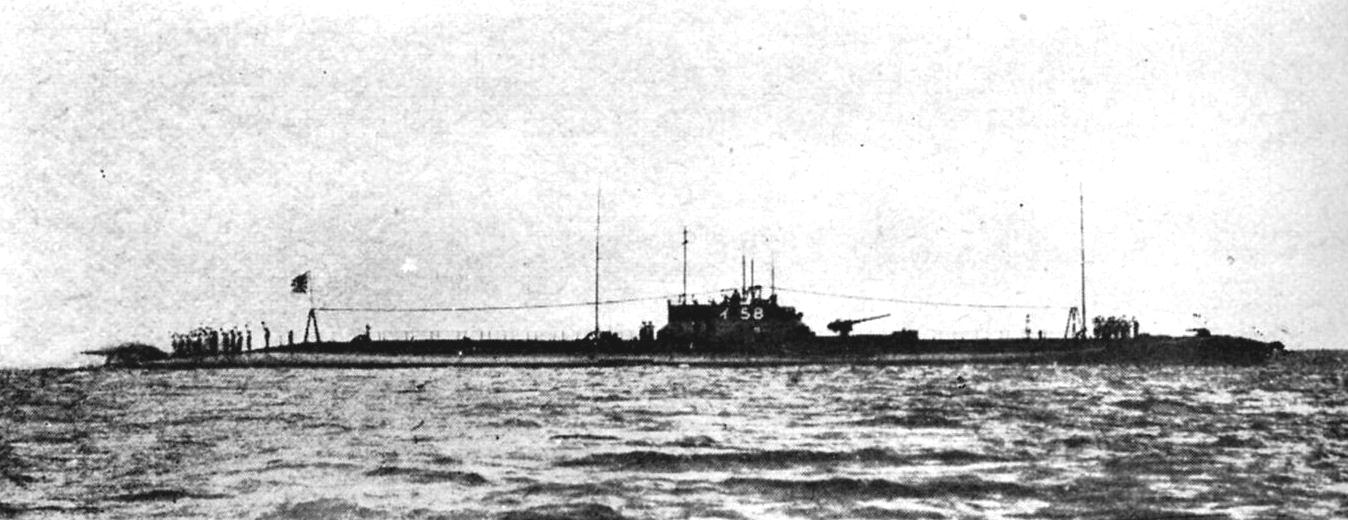
The Type B3 submarine I-58.

Eighteen of the twenty-one Type B Modified 2 or Junsen Type B Modified 2 type (乙型改二 or 巡潜乙型改二, (Cruiser submarine) Type B Modified 2) (I-54-class) submarines were cancelled in 1943 in favor of the Type E submarine, leaving the I-54, I-56, and I-58. In 1944, I-56 and I-58 were modified as Kaiten suicide torpedo carriers, each armed with four kaitens.

- I-54 – Missing off Leyte after 23 October 1944. Possibly sunk 28 October 1944 by USS Gridley and USS Helm.
- I-56 – Possibly sank USS Snook sometime after 8 April 1945. I-56 was herself later sunk 18 April 1945 by USS Collett.
- I-58 – Sank USS Indianapolis on 30 July 1945. I-58 surrendered on 2 September 1945, and scuttled off the Gotō Islands on 1 April 1946 as part of Operation Road's End. Wreck found in 2017.

==== Type C1 (5 units) ====
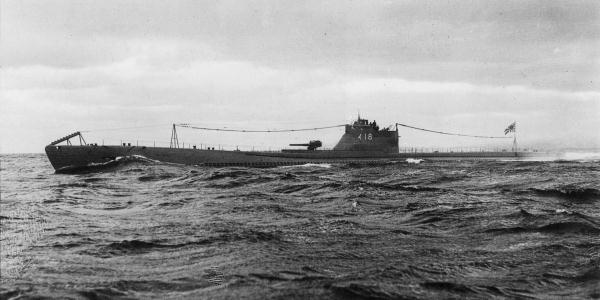
Type C1 submarine I-18

The Type C or Junsen C type (丙型 or 巡潜丙型, (Cruiser submarine) Type C) (I-16-class) submarines were based on the Junsen type submarine and developed from the Type KD6. This type, like the other Type C submarines, was utilized as mother ships for the Kō-hyōteki midget submarines and the Kaiten suicide torpedoes.

- I-16 – Sank Susak on 6 June 1942, Aghious Georgios on 8 June 1942, Supetar on 12 June 1942, and Eknaren on 1 July 1942. Sunk 19 May 1944 by USS England.
- I-18 – Sank Wilford on 8 June 1942, Mundra on 2 July 1942, and De Weert on 3 July 1942. Sunk 11 February 1943 by USS Fletcher.
- I-20 – Sank Johnstown on 5 June 1942, Christos Markettos on 8 June 1942, Mahronda on 11 June 1942, Hellenic Trader and Clifton Hall on 12 June 1942, Goviken on 29 June 1942, and Steaua Romana on 30 June 1942. Missing after 31 August 1943, probably sunk either on 1 September 1943 by USS Wadsworth or on 3 September 1943 by USS Ellet.
- I-22 – Sunk 6 October 1942 by a U.S. Navy PBY Catalina.
- I-24 – Sank Iron Chieftain on 3 June 1942. Rammed and sunk 11 June 1943 by USS PC-487.

==== Type C2 (I-46, I-47, I-48) ====
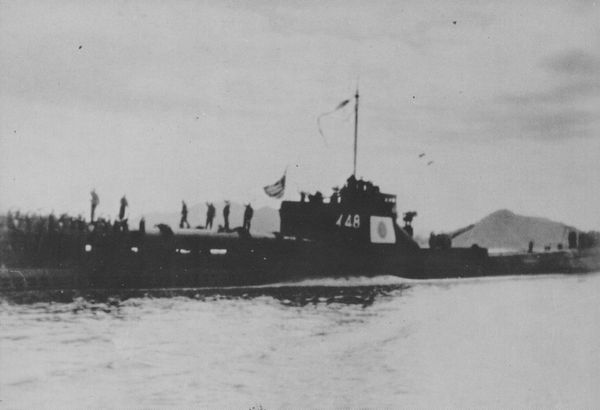
Type C2 submarine I-48.

The Type C or Junsen C type latter batch (丙型 or 巡潜丙型 (後期型), (Cruiser submarine) Type C (latter batch)) (I-46-subclass) submarines were nearly identical to the Type C1 with the exception that the Type C2 lacked the capability to carry the midget submarines. I-47 and I-48 were converted to carry kaiten manned suicide attack torpedoes.

- I-46 – Missing after 26 October 1944. Possibly sunk by USS Gridley and USS Helm on 28 October 1944. Also reported sunk by a multi-destroyer gun action involving USS Saufley, USS Renshaw, USS Waller, and USS Pringle around 28 November 1944.
- I-47 – Sank USS Mississinewa on 20 November 1944. I-47 surrendered on 2 September 1945 and was scuttled off the Gotō Islands on 1 April 1946 as part of Operation Road's End. Wreck found in 2017.
- I-48 – Sunk 23 January 1945 by USS Conklin.

==== Type C3 (I-52, I-53, I-55) ====
The Type C Modified or Junsen Type C Modified type (丙型改 or 巡潜丙型改, (Cruiser submarine) Type C Modified) submarines (I-52-class) were submarines of the Imperial Japanese Navy, designed and built by Mitsubishi Corporation, between 1943 and 1944, as cargo carriers. They were quite long and carried a crew of up to 94 officers and enlisted. They also had a long cruising range at a speed of 12 knots (22 km/h). The Japanese constructed only three of these during World War II (I-52, I-53 and I-55), although twenty were planned. They were among the largest submarines ever built to date, and were known as the most advanced submarines of the period. I-53 was converted to carry kaiten manned suicide attack torpedoes.

- I-52 – Sunk during Yanagi (exchange) mission to Germany on 24 June 1944 by aircraft from USS Bogue 800 nautical miles (1,500 km; 920 mi) southwest of the Azores. She was carrying Japanese engineers and a cargo of rubber, gold, and quinine to Germany.
- I-53 – Sank USS Underhill on 24 July 1945. I-53 surrendered on 2 September 1945 and sunk as a target off the Gotō Islands on 1 April 1946 by USS Nereus as part of Operation Road's End. Wreck found in 2017.
- I-55 – Missing after 13 July 1944. Possibly sunk by USS William C. Miller on 14 July 1944. Sinking also credited to USS Reynolds and USS Wyman on 28 July 1944.

==== Type D1 (11 units) ====
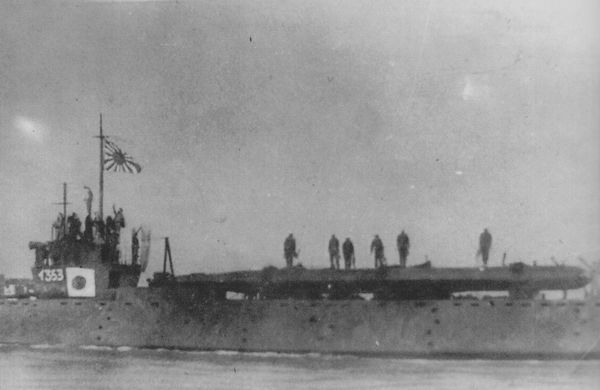
Type D1 submarine I-363.

The Type D ((潜)丁型, (Submarine) Type D) or Sen'yu(-Dai) type (潜輸(大)型, Transport submarine (large) type) (I-361-class) and Sen'yu Modified type (潜輸改, Transport submarine Modified) (I-372-class) submarines were based on the U-155. This type was designed as transport submarines with torpedoes for self-defense. Five of the submarines — I-361, I-363, I-366, I-367, and I-370 — were later modified to serve as kaiten suicide attack torpedo carriers, each armed with five kaitens.

- I-361 – Sunk southeast of Okinawa on 31 May 1945, by aircraft from USS Anzio.
- I-362 – Sunk in eastern Caroline Islands on 14 January 1945, by USS Fleming.
- I-363 – Sunk by mine off Miyazaki on 29 October 1945. Salvaged and scrapped on 26 January 1966.
- I-364 – Sunk east of Honshu on 16 September 1944, by USS Sea Devil.
- I-365 – Sunk southeast of Yokosuka on 29 November 1944, by USS Scabbardfish.
- I-366 – Blown up and scuttled off the Gotō Islands on 1 April 1946 as part of Operation Road's End.
- I-367 – Blown up and scuttled off the Gotō Islands on 1 April 1946 as part of Operation Road's End.
- I-368 – Sunk west of Iwo Jima on 26 February 1945, by aircraft from USS Anzio.
- I-369 – Surrendered on 30 August 1945 and scrapped at Yokosuka in 1946.
- I-370 – Sunk near Iwo Jima on 26 February 1945, by USS Finnegan.
- I-371 – Sunk in Bungo Strait on 24 February 1945, by USS Lagarto.
- I-372 – Sunk at Yokosuka on 18 July 1945, by aircraft from Task Force 38.

==== Type D2 (I-373) ====
The Type D Modified ((潜)丁型改, (Submarine) Type D Modified) (I-373-class) submarine was designed as a tanker submarine based on the Type D1 but with no torpedoes.

- I-373 – sunk in the East China Sea on August 14, 1945, by USS Spikefish. I-373 was the last Japanese submarine sunk in World War II.

==== Kiraisen Type (4 units) ====
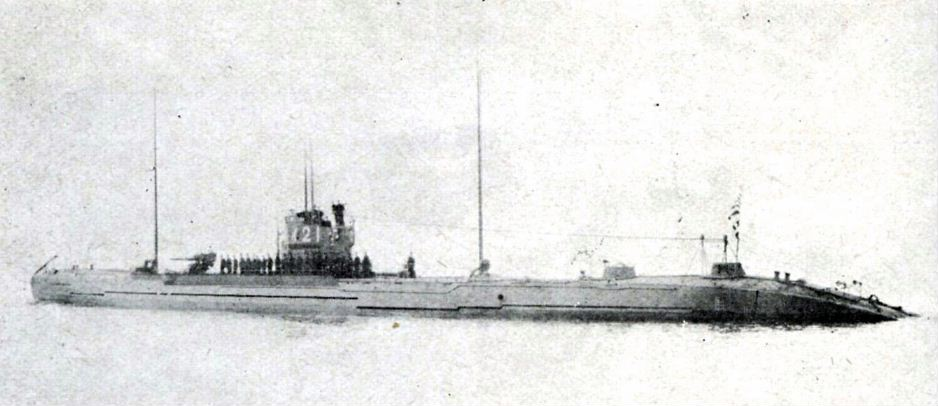
The Kiraisen-type submarine I-21 (later I-121).

The Kiraisen type (機雷潜型, Minelaying submarine) (I-121-class), the only Japanese minelayer submarines, were near-copies of the World War I German minelayer submarine UB-125. Originally numbered I-21, I-22, I-23, and I-24, they were renumbered I-121, I-122, I-123, and I-124, respectively, in 1938. This type saw front-line service during the Second Sino-Japanese War and the first half of World War II, modified to add seaplane refueling to their capabilities, but surviving units were relegated to training duties in September 1943 due to their growing obsolescence.

- I-21/I-121 – Surrendered in September 1945 and scuttled in Wakasa Bay along with Ro-68 and Ro-500 on 30 April 1946. Wreck found in 2018.
- I-22/I-122 – Sunk in the Sea of Japan 9 June 1945 by USS Skate.
- I-23/I-123 – Sunk off Savo Island 29 August 1942 by USS Gamble.
- I-24/I-124 – Sank Hareldawns off Luzon on 10 December 1941. Sunk off Darwin 20 January 1942 by HMAS Deloraine. I-124 was the first IJN warship sunk by the Royal Australian Navy.

==== Sen-Ho Type (I-351) ====
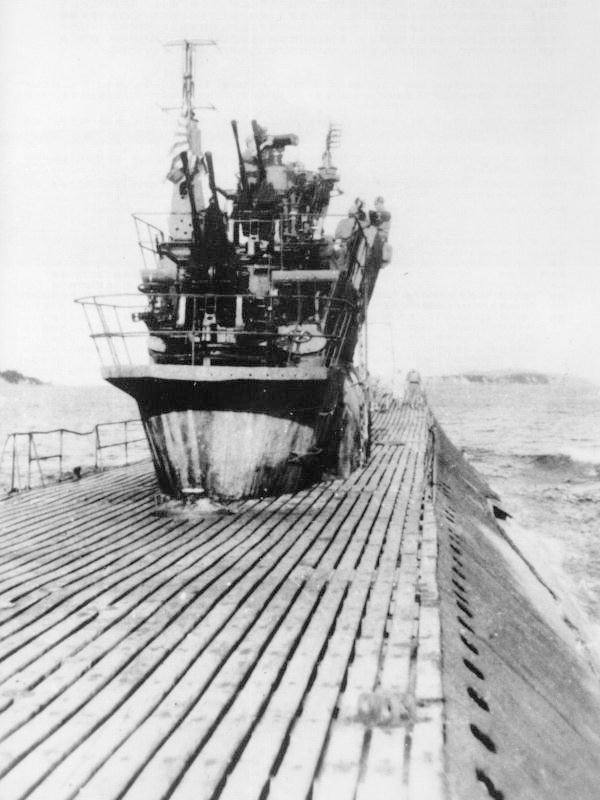
Sen-Ho-type submarine I-351.

The Senho type (潜補型, Submarine tanker) (I-351-class) was a tanker/transport submarine.

- I-351 – sunk July 14, 1945 in the South China Sea by USS Bluefish.

==== Sentoku Type (I-400, I-401, I-402) ====
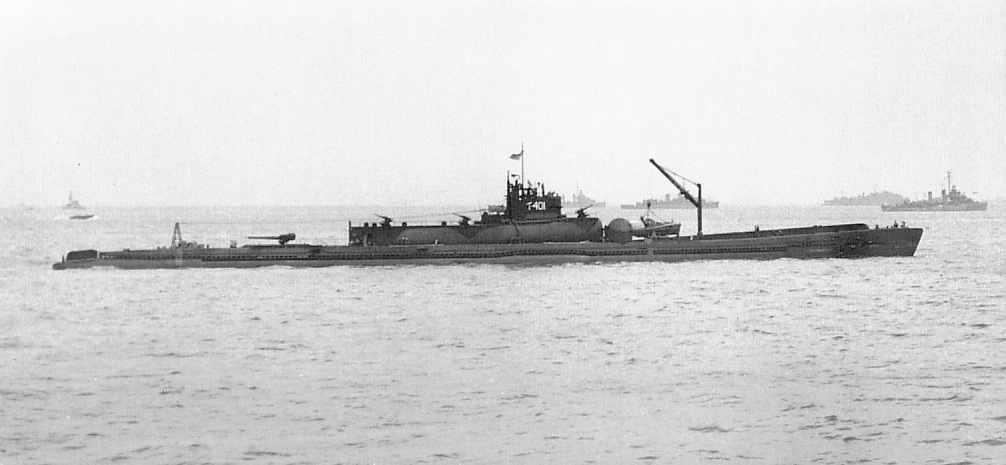
The I-400-class submarine I-401.

The Sentoku type (潜特型, Special type submarine) (I-400-class) displaced 5,223 tons surfaced and measured 400 ft 3 in (122.00 m) overall. They had a figure-eight hull shape for additional strength to handle the on-deck hangar for housing the three Seiran aircraft. In addition, they had four anti-aircraft guns, a large deck gun as well as eight torpedo tubes from which they could fire the 21-inch (533 mm) Type 95 torpedo.

Three of the Sentoku were built (I-400, I-401, and I-402). Each had four 1,825 horsepower (1,361 kW) engines and range 37,500 nmi (69,400 km) at 14 knots (26 km/h).

The submarines were also able to carry three Aichi M6A Sei ran aircraft, each carrying an 800 kg (1,800 lb) bomb 550 nautical miles (1,020 km) at 360 mph (580 km/h). To fit the aircraft in the hangar the wings of the aircraft were folded back, the horizontal stabilizers folded down, and the top of the vertical stabilizer folded over so the overall profile of the aircraft was within the diameter of its propeller. A crew of four could prepare and get all three airborne in 45 minutes launching them with a 120-foot (37 m) catapult on the fore deck of the giant submarine.

- I-400 – Surrendered 27 August 1945. Sunk as a target off Pearl Harbor on June 4, 1946 by USS Trumpetfish, reportedly to prevent it from falling into Soviet hands. Wreck found in 2013.
- I-401 – Surrendered 29 August 1945. Sunk as a target off Pearl Harbor on May 31, 1946 by USS Cabezon, reportedly to prevent it from falling into Soviet hands. Wreck found in 2005.
- I-402 – Surrendered in September 1945. Sunk as a target (along with Ha-201) 16 nmi off Kinai Island on April 1, 1946 by USS Everett F. Larson and USS Goodrich as part of Operation Road's End. Wreck located in 2015.

==== Sentaka Type (3 units) ====
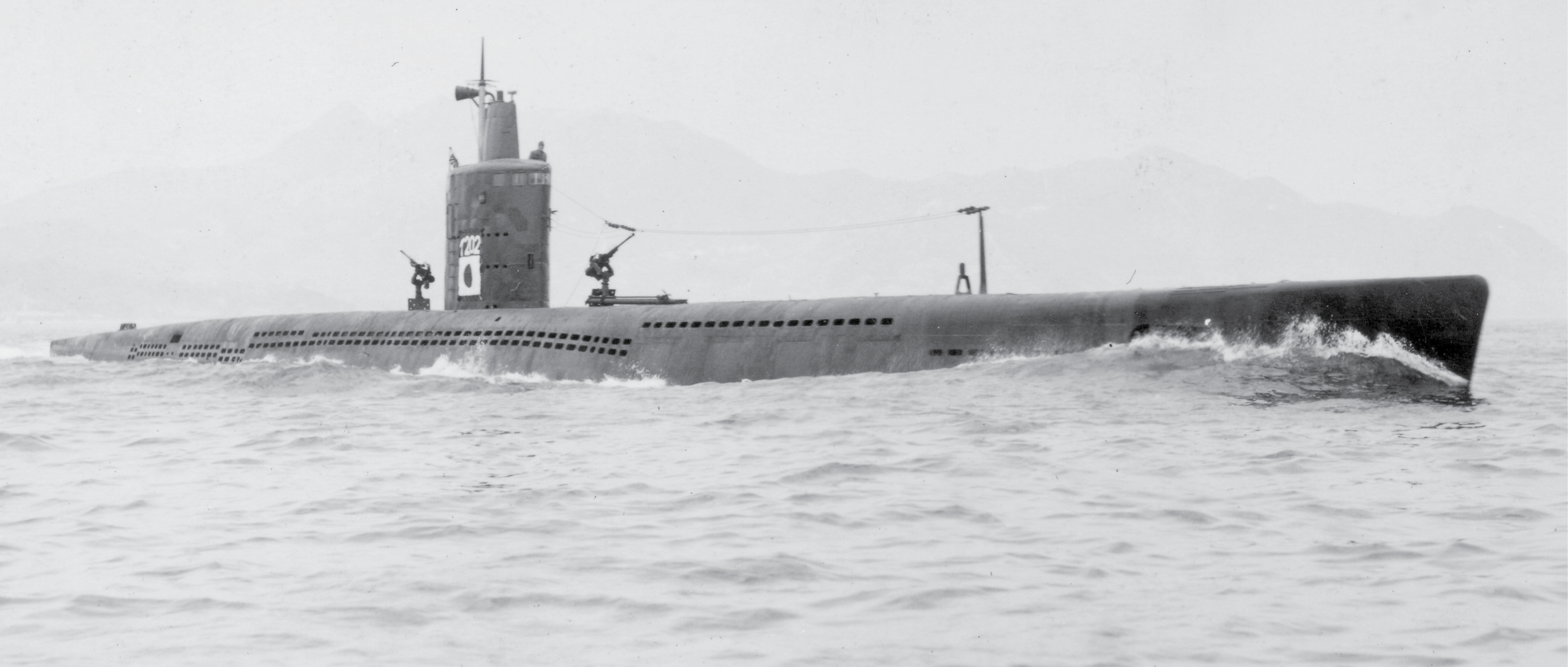
Sentaka-Type submarine I-202.

The Sentaka(-Dai) type (潜高(大)型, High-speed submarine (large) type) (I-201-class) submarines were modern design, and known as Sentaka (From Sen, abbreviation of Sensuikan, "Submarine", and Taka, abbreviation of Kōsoku, "High speed"). Three were built, I-201, I-202, and I-203 (I-204 to I-208 were not completed).

They displaced 1,070 tonnes, had a test depth of 360 feet (110 m), and were armed with four torpedo tubes and Type 96 25 mm (0.98 in) guns in retractable mounts to maintain streamlining. These submarines were designed for mass production. They were high-performance boats, with streamlined all-welded hulls and a high battery capacity supplying two 2,500 hp (1,900 kW) motors, which had nearly double the horsepower of the German-designed MAN diesels. The submerged speed was 19 knots (35 km/h), more than double that achieved by contemporary American designs. They were equipped with a snorkel, allowing for underwater diesel operation while recharging batteries.

- I-201 – Surrendered 2 September 1945. Sunk as a target off Pearl Harbor on May 23, 1946 by USS Queenfish, reportedly to prevent it from falling into Soviet hands. Wreck found in 2009 along with that of I-14.
- I-202 – Handed over to the Allies on 30 November 1945. Scuttled by the US Navy off the Gotō Islands on April 5, 1946 to avoid trouble between Britain and the Soviet Union (as both nations wanted to acquire the submarine).
- I-203 – Surrendered 2 September 1945. Sunk as a target off Pearl Harbor on May 21, 1946 by USS Caiman.
- I-204 – Was 90% complete. Sunk by air raid on 22 June 1945. Salvaged and scrapped at Kure in February to May 1948.
- I-205 – Was 80% complete. Sunk by air raid on 28 July 1945. Salvaged and scrapped at Kure in May to August 1948.
- I-206 – Was 85% complete. Construction stopped 26 March 1945. Scrapped at Kure October 1946 to January 1947.
- I-207 – Was 20% complete. Construction stopped 17 April 1945. Scrapped at Kure April to May 1946.
- I-208 – Was 5% complete. Construction stopped 17 April 1945. Scrapped at Kure April to May 1946 with I-207.

=== Second-class submarines ===
These submarines included medium-sized, medium-ranged units of the Imperial Japanese Navy.

==== Type F1 (Ro-1, Ro-2) ====
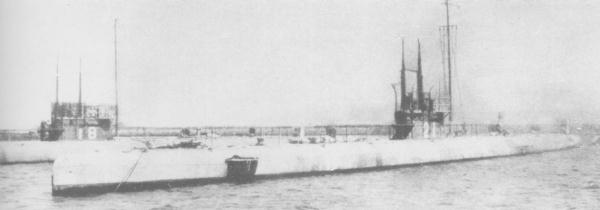
Type F1 submarines Ro-1 (left background) and Ro-2 (foreground).

Constructed between 1917 and 1920, Type F1 (F1型) (Ro-1-class) submarines were the first truly oceangoing Japanese submarines and the earliest to be rated as "second-class" or "medium" submarines. The Fiat-Laurenti-designed submarines had weak hulls, and they did not serve as the basis for future Japanese submarine classes.

- Ro-1 – Stricken 1932.
- Ro-2 – Stricken 1932.

==== Type F2 (3 units) ====
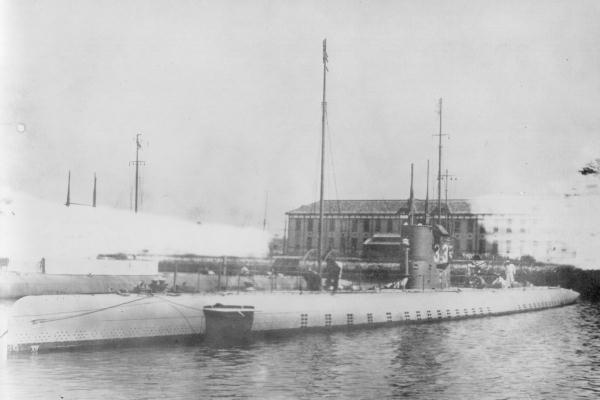
Type F2 submarine Ro-5.

Constructed between 1919 and 1922, Type F2 (F2型) (Ro-3-class) submarines had a modified bridge. Their Fiat diesel engines were unreliable, and like the F1 subclass they did not serve as the basis for future Japanese submarine classes.

- Ro-3 – Stricken 1932.
- Ro-4 – Stricken 1932.
- Ro-5 – Stricken 1932.

==== Kaichū I Type (2 units) ====
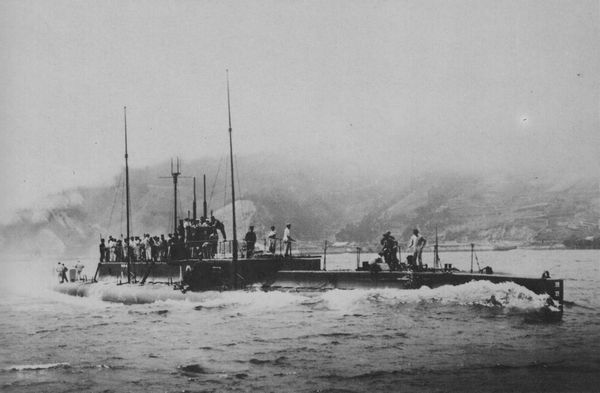
Kaichū I Type submarine Ro-11.

Constructed between 1917 and 1919, the Kaichū Type (海中型, Navy Medium Type) I submarines were the first submarines built to Japanese requirements and designed specifically for service in the waters of East Asia and the Pacific Ocean, with greater hull strength than was common in contemporary European submarines. They had four bow torpedo tubes and two external tubes in trainable cradles on deck. and a 76.2 mm (3 in) deck gun.

- Ro-11 – Stricken and hulked in 1932.
- Ro-12 – Stricken and hulked in 1932.

==== Kaichū II Type (3 units) ====
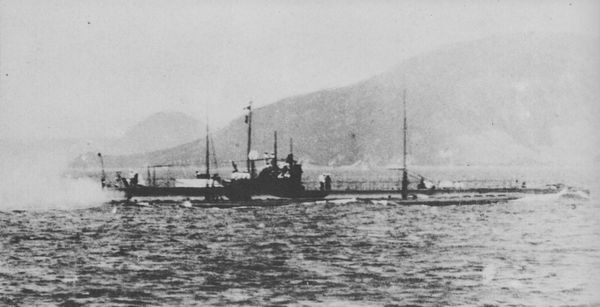
Kaichū II Type submarine Ro-15.

Constructed between 1918 and 1920, the Kaichū Type (海中型, Navy Medium Type) II submarines had a longer range than the Kaichu I submarines, and the two trainable external torpedo tubes were replaced by two fixed external tubes.

- Ro-13 – Stricken and hulked in 1932.
- Ro-14 – Stricken 1932, hulked 1934, and scrapped 1948.
- Ro-15 – Stricken 1933, hulked 1934, and scrapped 1948.

==== Kaichū III Type (10 units) ====
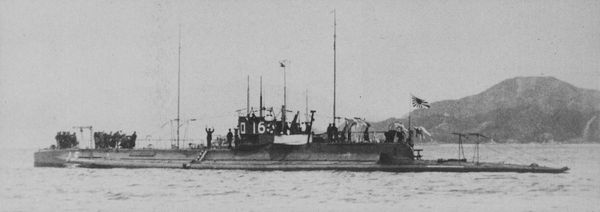
Kaichū III Type submarine Ro-16.

Constructed between 1919 and 1921, the Kaichū Type (海中型, Navy Medium Type) III submarines had slightly improved performance and a greater diving depth than the Kaichu I and II Type submarines.

- Ro-16 – Stricken in 1933 and hulked in 1934.
- Ro-17 – Stricken in 1936.
- Ro-18 – Stricken in 1936 and hulked; scrapped in 1948.
- Ro-19 – Stricken in 1936 and hulked; scrapped in 1948.
- Ro-20 – Stricken in 1934; sold and scuttled as an artificial reef in 1935.
- Ro-21 – Stricken in 1934; sold and scuttled as an artificial reef in 1935.
- Ro-22 – Stricken in 1934.
- Ro-23 – Stricken and hulked in 1935.
- Ro-24 – Stricken and hulked in 1935.
- Ro-25 – Sank in 1923. Salvaged and returned to service in 1926. Stricken and scrapped in 1936.

==== Kaichū IV Type (3 units) ====
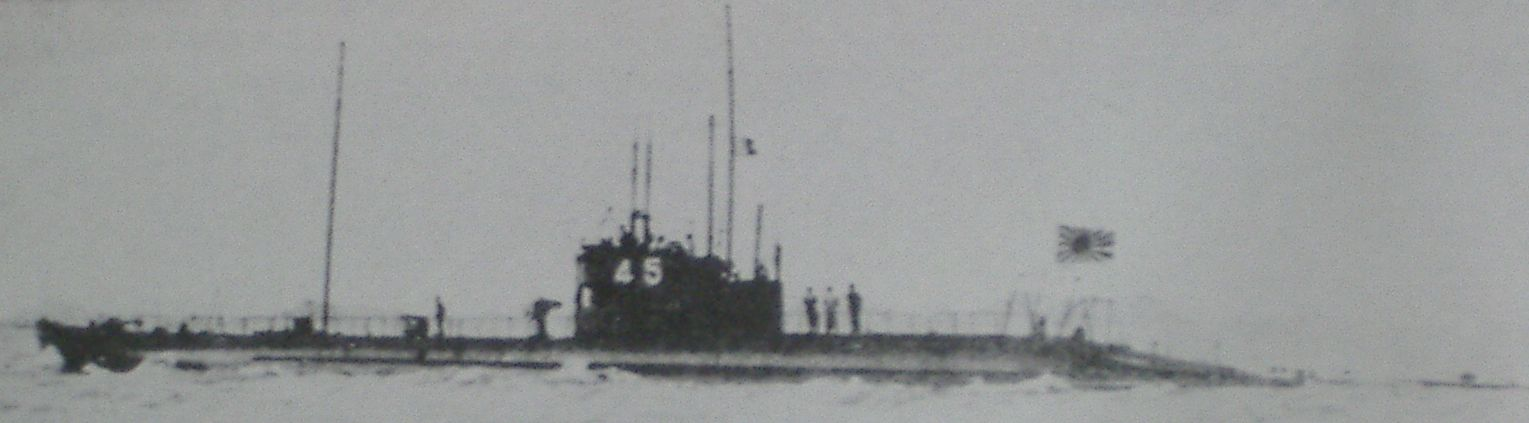
Kaichū IV Type submarine Ro-26.

The Kaichū Type (海中型, Navy Medium Type) IV submarines were constructed between 1921 and 1922. The two external torpedo tubes of the previous Kaichū Types were deleted, but the Kaichū IV Type had larger torpedo tubes and carried heavier torpedoes.

- Ro-26 – Stricken and hulked in 1940; scrapped in 1948.
- Ro-27 – Stricken in 1940 and hulked; scrapped in 1947.
- Ro-28 – Sank in 1935, but salvaged and returned to service. Stricken and hulked in 1940; scrapped in 1948.

==== Kaichū V Type (4 units) ====
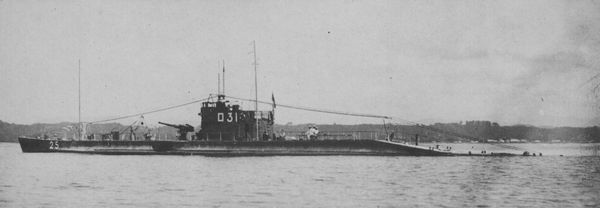
Kaichū V Type submarine Ro-31.

Constructed between 1921 and 1927, the Kaichū Type (海中型, Navy Medium Type) IV submarines were designed for anti-commerce warfare and had heavier deck guns than previous Kaichū Type submarines.

- Ro-29 – Stricken in 1936 and hulked in 1940.
- Ro-30 – Stricken and hulked in 1942; scrapped in 1945.
- Ro-31 – Sank in 1923 during trials. Salvaged, disassembled, reconstructed, and completed in 1927. Stricken and hulked in 1945. Scuttled on 5 April 1946.
- Ro-32 – Stricken and hulked in 1942; scrapped in 1945.

==== Kaichū VI Type (2 units) ====
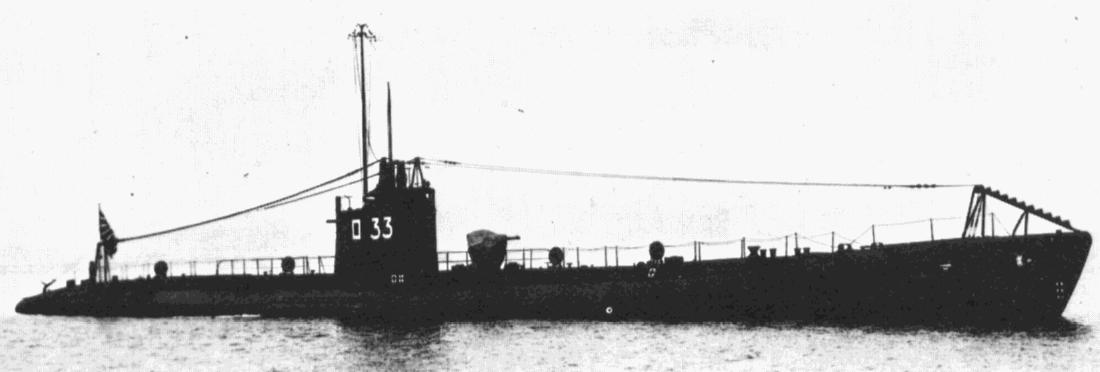
Kaichū VI Type submarine Ro-33.

The Kaichū Type (海中型, Navy Medium Type) VI submarines were double-hulled, medium-sized submarines. They were derived from the preceding Kaichū V Type and had improved performance. Constructed between 1933 and 1937, they served as prototypes for the major production Kaichu VII type constructed during World War II. They had a 76.2 mm (3 in)/40) deck gun and Type 95 (known to the Allies as the "Long Lance") torpedoes.

- Ro-33 – Sank Mamutu in the Gulf of Papua on 7 August 1942. Sunk off Port Moresby on 29 August 1942 by HMAS Arunta.
- Ro-34 – Sunk off San Cristobal on 7 April 1943 by USS Strong.

==== Kaichū VII Type (18 units) ====
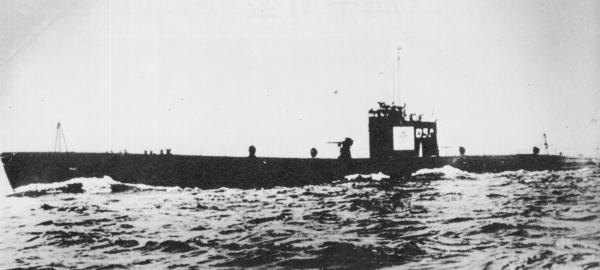
Kaichū VII type submarine Ro-50.

The (Sen-)Chū or Kaichū VII Type ((潜)中型 or 海中VII型, (Submarine) Medium type or Navy Medium Type VII) submarines were the Imperial Japanese Navy′s last medium submarines, and were enlarged and improved versions of the preceding Kaichū VI Type.

- Ro-35 – Sunk east of the Santa Cruz Islands on 25 August 1943 by USS Patterson.
- Ro-36 – Sunk east of Saipan on 13 June 1944 by USS Melvin.
- Ro-37 – Sunk southeast of San Cristobal on 22 January 1944 by USS Buchanan.
- Ro-38 – Missing off the Gilbert Islands after 19 November 1943. Possibly sunk by USS Cotten west of Tarawa on 24 November 1943.
- Ro-39 – Sunk east of Wotje on 1 February 1944 by USS Walker.
- Ro-40 – Sunk northeast of Kwajalein on 16 February 1944 by USS Phelps.
- Ro-41 – Sank USS Shelton east of Morotai on 3 October 1944. Sunk east of Okinawa on 23 March 1945 by USS Haggard.
- Ro-42 – Sank USS YO-159 east of Espiritu Santo on 14 January 1944. Sunk east of Roi-Namur on 11 June 1944 by USS Bangust.
- Ro-43 – Sunk off the Volcano Islands on 26 February 1945 by aircraft from USS Anzio.
- Ro-44 – Sunk east of Eniwetok on 16 June 1944 by USS Burden R. Hastings.
- Ro-45 – Sunk south of Truk on 30 April 1944 by USS MacDonough and USS Stephen Potter.
- Ro-46 – Missing off Okinawa after 17 April 1945. Possibly sunk by aircraft from VC-92 on 29 April 1945.
- Ro-47 – Sunk northeast of the Palau Islands on 26 September 1944 by USS McCoy Reynolds.
- Ro-48 – Sunk east of Saipan on 19 July 1944 by USS Wyman.
- Ro-49 – Missing southeast of Okinawa after 25 March 1945. Possibly sunk by USS Hudson southeast of Okinawa on 5 April 1945.
- Ro-50 – Sank USS LST-577 east-southeast of Leyte on 10–11 February 1945. Surrendered at Sasebo in September 1945. Scuttled off the Goto Islands on 1 April 1946 as part of Operation Road's End.
- Ro-55 – Sunk west of Luzon on 7 February 1945 by USS Thomason.
- Ro-56 – Sunk west of Okinawa on 9 April 1945 by USS Monssen and USS Mertz.

==== Type L1 (Ro-51, Ro-52) ====
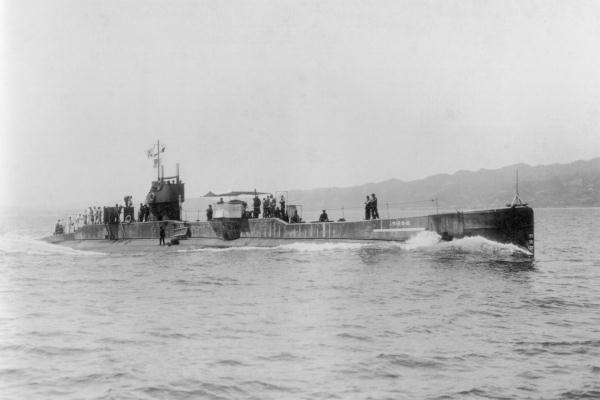
Type L1 submarine Ro-51.

The Type L1 (L1型) (Ro-51-class) submarines were British L-class submarines built under license by Mitsubishi.

- Ro-51 – Stricken and hulked on 1 April 1940.
- Ro-52 – Sunk on 29 October 1923, raised, repaired and returned to service. Sank again on 29 October 1925, raised and repaired. Stricken 1 April 1932.

==== Type L2 (Ro-53, Ro-54, Ro-55, Ro-56) ====
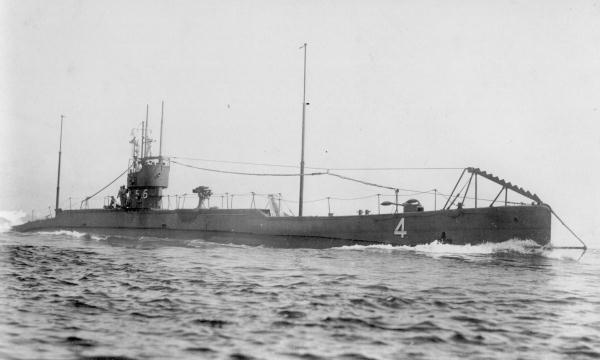
Type L2 submarine Ro-56.

The Type L2 (L2二 two) (Ro-53-class) submarines were similar to the Type L1 but with no broadside torpedo tubes and a change in the battery arrangement.

- Ro-53 – Stricken and hulked in 1940.
- Ro-54 – Stricken and hulked in 1940.
- Ro-55 – Stricken 1940.
- Ro-56 – Stricken and hulked in 1940.

==== Type L3 (Ro-57, Ro-58, Ro-59) ====
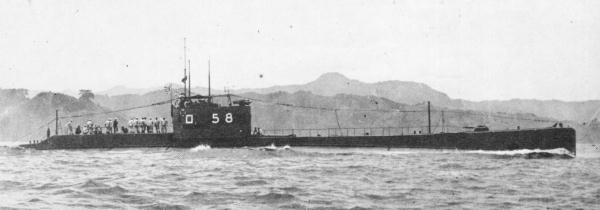
Type L3 submarine Ro-58.

The Type L3 (L3型) (Ro-57-class) submarines were copies of the British submarine L9. Three units were built — Ro-57, Ro-58, Ro-59 — and all served as training submarines during World War II.

- Ro-57 – Scrapped in 1946.
- Ro-58 – Scrapped in 1946.
- Ro-59 – Scrapped in 1946.

==== Type L4 (9 units) ====
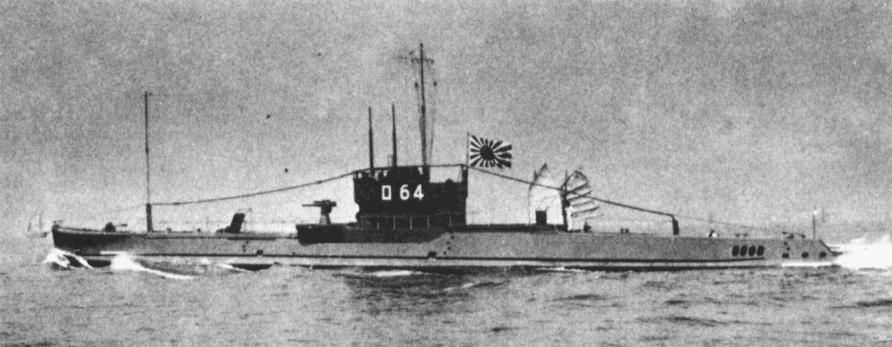
Type L4 submarine Ro-64.

The Type L4 (L4型) (Ro-60-class) submarines were copies of the British submarine L52.

- Ro-60 – Wrecked on a reef off Kwajalein Atoll on 29 December 1941. Later blew up following an aircraft attack.
- Ro-61 – Sunk in the Bering Sea off Adak by USS Reid on 31 August 1942.
- Ro-62 – Scuttled in the Seto Inland Sea in May 1946.
- Ro-63 – Scuttled in the Seto Inland Sea in May 1946.
- Ro-64 – Sunk by a mine in Hiroshima Bay on 12 April 1945.
- Ro-65 – Sank in a diving accident off Kiska on 3 November 1942.
- Ro-66 – Accidentally rammed and sunk by Ro-62 off Wake Island on 17 December 1941.
- Ro-67 – Scrapped in 1946.
- Ro-68 – Scuttled in Wakasa Bay along with Ro-500 and I-121 on 30 April 1946. Wreck found in 2018.

==== Ko Type (18 units) ====
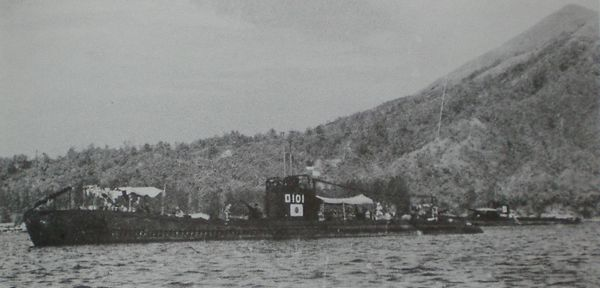
Ko-Type submarine Ro-101.

The Ko or Sen-Shō type (小型 or 潜小型, Small type or Submarine small type) (Ro-100-class) were medium-sized submarines for use as point-defense submarines.

- Ro-100 – Sunk by mine in the Bougainville Strait on 25 November 1943.
- Ro-101 – Sunk in Indispensable Strait by USS Saufley and a U.S. Navy patrol aircraft on 15 September 1943.
- Ro-102 – Missing off New Guinea after 9 May 1943.
- Ro-103 – Sank USS Aludra and USS Deimos off San Cristobal on 23 June 1943. Missing in the Solomon Islands after 28 July 1943.
- Ro-104 – Sunk north of the Admiralty Islands on 23 May 1944 by USS England.
- Ro-105 – Sunk north of the Admiralty Islands on 31 May 1944 by USS England.
- Ro-106 – Sank USS LST-342 in the Blanche Channel on 18 July 1943. Sunk north of the Admiralty Islands on 22 May 1944 by USS England.
- Ro-107 – Missing after 6 July 1943 in the Solomon Islands.
- Ro-108 – Sank USS Henley in the Huon Gulf on 3 October 1943. Sunk north of the Admiralty Islands on 26 May 1944 by USS England.
- Ro-109 – Sunk south-southwest of Okidaitōjima on 25 April 1945 by USS Horace A. Bass.
- Ro-110 – Possibly sank Daisy Moller in the Bay of Bengal on 3 December 1943. Sunk in the Bay of Bengal northeast of Madras on 11 February 1944 by HMIS Jumna, HMAS Ipswich, and HMAS Launceston.
- Ro-111 – Sank Peshawur in the Bay of Bengal southeast of Madras on 23 December 1943 and El Madina in the Bay of Bengal near Calcutta on 16 March 1944. Sunk north of the Admiralty Islands on 10 June 1944 by USS Taylor.
- Ro-112 – Sunk north of Luzon on 11 February 1945 by USS Batfish.
- Ro-113 – Sank Marion Moller in the Bay of Bengal on 6 November 1944. Sunk north of Luzon on 13 February 1945 by USS Batfish (SS-310).
- Ro-114 – Sunk west of Tinian on 17 June 1944 by USS Melvin and USS Wadleigh.
- Ro-115 – Sunk off Mindoro on 1 February 1945 by USS Ulvert M. Moore.
- Ro-116 – Sunk north of the Admiralty Islands on 24 May 1944 by USS England.
- Ro-117 – Sunk southeast of Saipan on 17 June 1944 by U.S. Navy patrol aircraft.

=== Third-class submarines ===
==== Sen'yu-Ko Type (10 units) ====
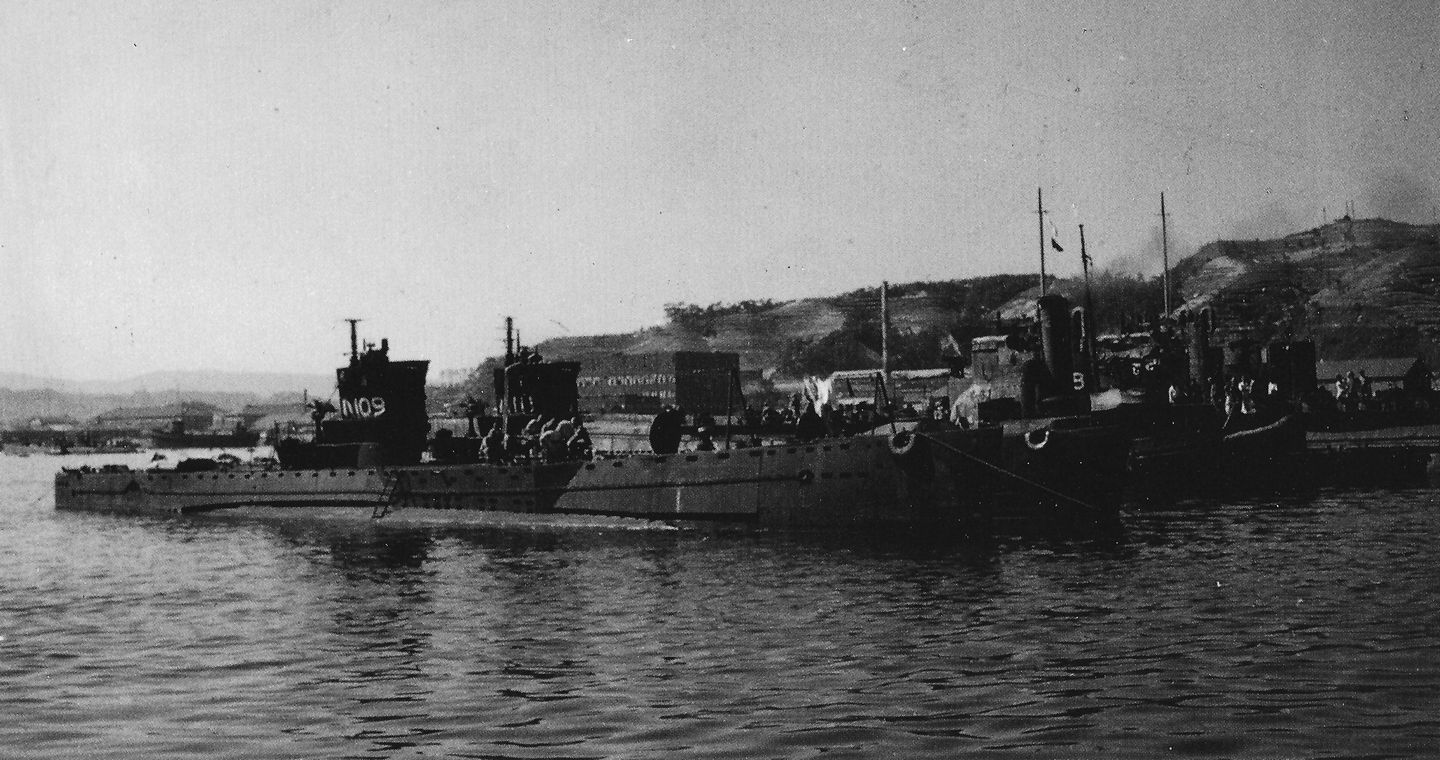
Sen′yu-Ko-Type submarines Ha-109 and Ha-111.

The Sen'yu-Ko or Sen'yu-Shō type (潜輸小型, Transport submarine small type) were transport submarines built in 1944–1945. Several of this type were converted to tankers or to mother ships for the midget submarines. Ten of the 12 submarines laid down were completed.

- Ha-101 – Scrapped at Uraga or scuttled off Shimizu (sources disagree) in October 1945.
- Ha-102 – Scrapped at Uraga or scuttled off Shimizu (sources disagree) in October 1945.
- Ha-103 – Scuttled off the Gotō Islands on 1 April 1946 as part of Operation Road's End.
- Ha-104 – Scuttled off Shimizu in October 1945.
- Ha-105 – Scuttled off the Gotō Islands on 1 April 1946 as part of Operation Road's End.
- Ha-106 – Blown up and scuttled along with I-36 off the Goto Islands on 1 April 1946 as part of Operation Road's End.
- Ha-107 – Scuttled off the Gotō Islands on 1 April 1946 as part of Operation Road's End.
- Ha-108 – Scuttled off the Gotō Islands on 1 April 1946 as part of Operation Road's End.
- Ha-109 – Scuttled off the Gotō Islands on 1 April 1946 as part of Operation Road's End.
- Ha-110 – Was 95% complete. Sank in 1945 during construction and later refloated. Scuttled along with Ha-112 off Kii Suido on 15 April 1946. Other sources state that she was scrapped.
- Ha-111 – Scuttled off the Gotō Islands on 1 April 1946 as part of Operation Road's End.
- Ha-112 – Was 95% complete. Scuttled along with Ha-110 off Kii Sundo on 15 April 1946. Other sources state she was scrapped at Kobe.

==== Sentaka-Ko Type (10 units) ====
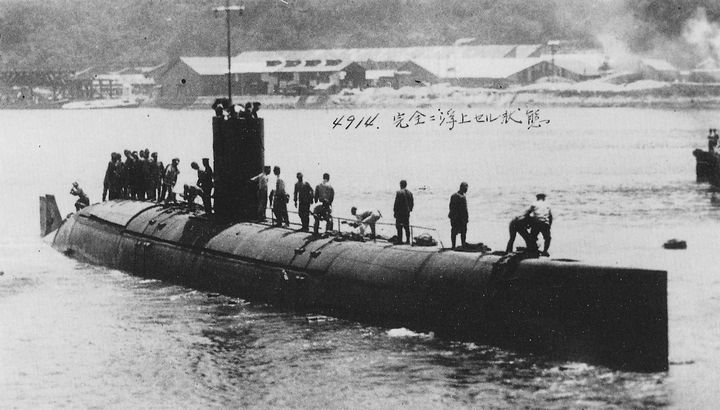
Sentaka-Ko-Type submarine Ha-204.

The Sentaka-Ko or Sentaka-Shō type (潜高小型, High-speed submarine small type) (Submarine High speed-Small type) were small, high-speed submarines constructed in 1944–1945 to defend the Japanese Home Islands from an Allied invasion. Of the 79 boats planned, only ten were completed.

- Ha-201 – Sunk as a target off the Gotō Islands on 1 April 1946 along with I-402 as part of Operation Road's End.
- Ha-202 – Scuttled off the Gotō Islands on 1 April 1946 as part of Operation Road's End.
- Ha-203 – Scuttled off the Gotō Islands on 1 April 1946 as part of Operation Road's End.
- Ha-204 – Ran aground in Aburatsu Bay on 29 October 1945, salvaged and then scrapped August to October 1948.
- Ha-205 – Scuttled by gunfire from HMAS Quiberon and HMIS Sutlej in the Seto Inland Sea on 9 May 1946 as part of Operation Bottom.
- Ha-206 – Abandoned at Sasebo at 90% complete. Sank in a typhoon on 25 August 1945 and raised in April 1946. Scuttled off Kii Suido Channel on 6 May 1946. Refloated and scrapped at Kobe in 1952.
- Ha-207 – Scuttled by the US Navy along with Ro-31, Ha-210, Ha-215, Ha-216, Ha-219 and Ha-228 off Sasebo Bay on 5 April 1946.
- Ha-208 – Scuttled off the Gotō Islands on 1 April 1946 as part of Operation Road's End.
- Ha-209 – Deliberately run aground on Ganryū-jima on 18 August 1945. Blown up on 11 November 1945 by the US Navy. Salvaged from August to November 1946 and then scrapped.
- Ha-210 – Scuttled by the US Navy along with Ro-31, Ha-207, Ha-215, Ha-216, Ha-219 and Ha-228 off Sasebo Bay on 5 April 1946.
- Ha-216 – Scuttled by the US Navy along with Ro-31, Ha-207, Ha-210, Ha-215, Ha-219 and Ha-228 off Sasebo Bay on 5 April 1946.

=== Midget submarines ===
This class includes the smallest of the Japanese submarines, from midget submarines to manned torpedoes often used for suicide attacks.

==== Ko-Hyoteki Type (50 units) ====
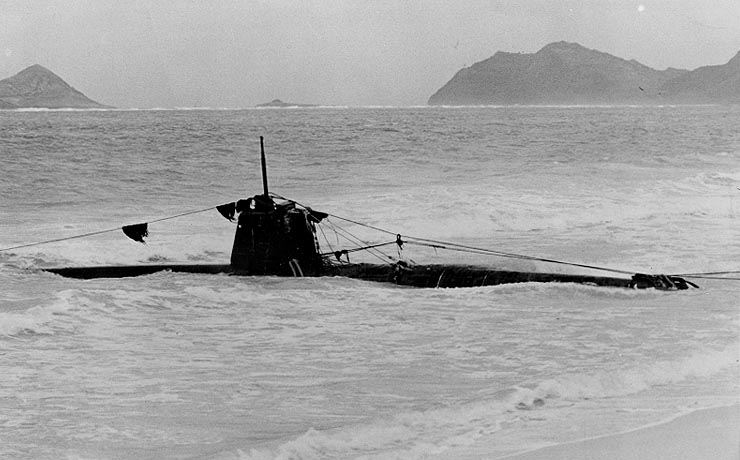
Kō-hyōteki-class submarine grounded after the Attack on Pearl Harbor, December 1941.

The Kō-hyōteki (甲標的, Target 'A') class of Japanese midget submarines had hull numbers but no names. For simplicity, they are most often referred to by the hull number of the mother submarine. Thus, the midget carried by I-16 was known as the I-16 midget. The midget submarine hull numbers beginning with the character "Ha", which can only be seen on a builder's plate inside the hull. The "A Target" name was assigned as a ruse – if their design was prematurely discovered by Japan's foes, the Japanese Navy could insist that the vessels were battle practice targets. They were also called "tubes" and other slang names.

216 boats were completed, with three initial prototypes, class being then divided in four types:

Type A Kō-hyōteki (甲標的甲型, Kō-hyōteki kō-gata; Target 'A', Type 'A')
46 built
Type B Kō-hyōteki (甲標的乙型, Kō-hyōteki otsu-gata; Target 'A', Type 'B')
5 built
Type C Kō-hyōteki (甲標的丙型, Kō-hyōteki hei-gata; Target 'A', Type 'C')
47 built
Type D Kō-hyōteki (甲標的丁型, Kō-hyōteki tei-gata; Target 'A', Type 'D')
better known as Kōryū (蛟龍), 115 buit

==== Kairyū Type (250 units) ====
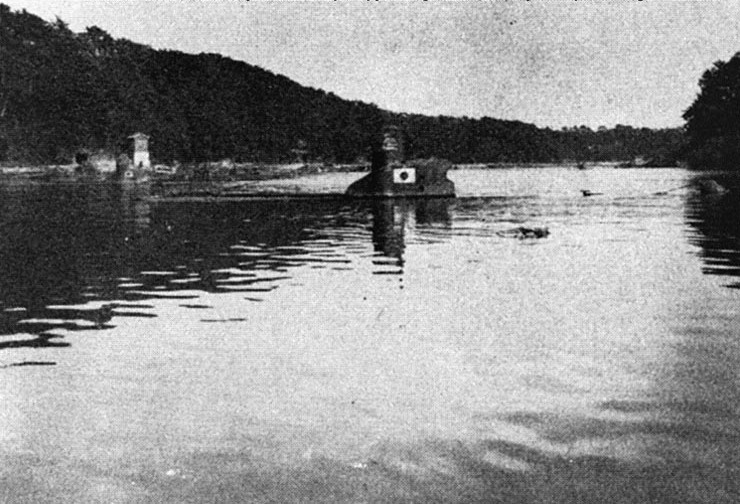
A Kairyū in the Aburatsubo inlet.

The Kairyū (海龍, Sea Dragon) was a class of midget submarines designed in 1943–1944, and produced from the beginning of 1945. These submarines were meant to meet the invading American Naval forces upon their anticipated approach of Tokyo.

Over 760 of these submarines were planned, and by August 1945, 250 had been manufactured, most of them at the Yokosuka shipyard.

These submarines had a two-man crew and were fitted with an internal warhead for suicide missions.

==== Kaiten Type (400 units) ====
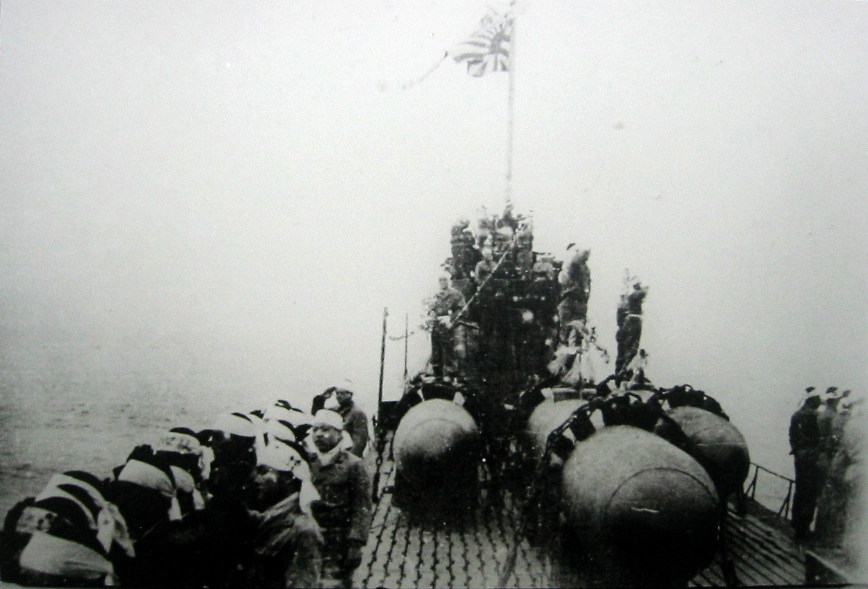
Kaiten manned torpedoes, stacked atop a departing submarine.

The Kaiten (回天) was a torpedo modified as a suicide weapon, and used by the Imperial Japanese Navy in the final stages of the Second World War. Kaiten means "return to the sky"; however, it is commonly translated as "turn toward heaven".

Early designs allowed for the pilot to escape after the final acceleration towards the target, although whether this could have been done successfully is doubtful. There is no record of any pilot attempting to escape or intending to do so, and this provision was dropped from later production kaitens.

Six models were designed, the types 1, 2, 4, 5 and 6 were based on the Long Lance type 93 torpedo (24 inch oxygen/kerosene), and the Type 10, based on the Type 92 torpedo (21 inch electric). Types 2, 4, 5, 6 and 10 were only manufactured as prototypes and never used in combat.

== Bibliography ==
- Baldwin, Hanson W. Sea Fights and Shipwrecks. Hanover House; 1956, NY, USA.
- Boyne, Walter. Clash of Titans. Simon and Schuster; 1995. NY, USA. ISBN 0-684-80196-5.
- Hasimoto, Mochisura. Sunk; The Story of the Japanese Submarine Fleet, 1941–1945. Henry Holt, 1954; Reprinted by Progressive Press, NY, 2010. ISBN 1-61577-581-1.
- Jentschura, Hansgeorg; Dieter Jung, Peter Mickel. Warships of the Imperial Japanese Navy, 1869–1945. United States Naval Institute, Annapolis, Maryland, USA, 1977. ISBN 0-87021-893-X.
- Morris, Richard Knowles, PhD, Who Built Those Subs?, Naval History Magazine, United States Naval Institute Press, October 1998, 125th Anniversary Issue.
- Orita, Zenji. I-Boat Captain. Major Books Pub.; 1976.
- International Directory of Company Histories, Volume 86. Published July 2007. Gale Group/St. James Press.
- The Klaxon, official U.S. Navy submarine force newsletter. Published by the Nautilus Memorial Force Library Force Library and Museum, Summer issue, 1992. Account of Arthur Busch/Du Busc's key role pioneering America's first submarines for John Philip Holland – and the first five Imperial Japanese Naval Submarines on behalf of the newly formed Electric Boat Company.
