= Tsutomu Sakuma =

- 佐久間 勉
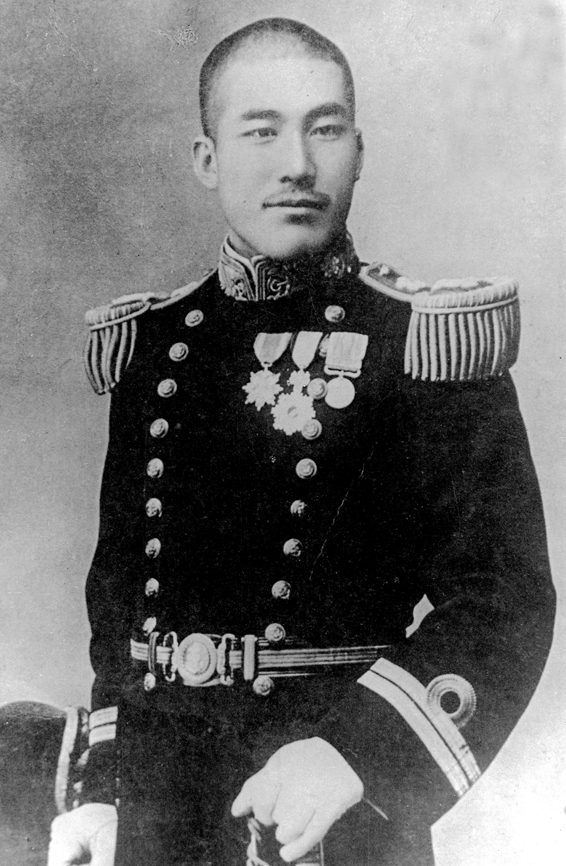
- Born: 13 September 1879; Fukui, Japan
- Died: April 15, 1910 (aged 30); Inland Sea, Japan
- Military career
- Allegiance: Empire of Japan
- Branch: Imperial Japanese Navy
- Service years: 1901–1910
- Rank: Lieutenant
- Commands: No.4 submarine Staff Officer 1st Fleet; The destroyer Harukaze (春風); No.6 submarine
- Conflicts: Russo-Japanese War

Tsutomu Sakuma (佐久間 勉, Sakuma Tsutomu; September 13, 1879 – April 15, 1910) was a career naval officer in the Imperial Japanese Navy, and a pioneer submarine commander, known primarily as the commanding officer during the sinking of Submarine No.6.

== Biography ==
Born in Mikata District Fukui prefecture (present-day city of Wakasa, Fukui), to the family of a Shinto priest, Sakuma graduated from the 29th class of the Imperial Japanese Naval Academy in 1901. One of his classmates was the future Navy Minister and Prime Minister of Japan Mitsumasa Yonai. He was assigned to the cruiser Azuma shortly before the start of the Russo-Japanese War. He subsequently served with the 15th Torpedo Boat Flotilla, and was on board the cruiser Kasagi during the Battle of Tsushima on May 26, 1905.

After completing the torpedo warfare school, Sakuma served on the submarine tender Karasaki and was later a squad leader on the Japanese cruiser Tsushima. He started to get involved in the submarine service in 1906, first taking the command of the No.4 submarine, and eventually the Japan-built Holland-type No.6 in 1908.

On April 15, 1910, while engaged in a practice dive in the Inland Sea off of the coast of Yamaguchi Prefecture,the submarine flooded and sank during an unauthorized exercise of diving with the air intake pipe above the water's surface—an act prohibited due to safety concerns. Sakuma's mishandling, which led to the ship diving to a depth of 10 feet, combined with a failure of the intake pipe's safety device, caused the flooding. Furthermore, Sakuma habitually disregarded the training times agreed upon with the mother ship and repeatedly conducted long-duration dives without authorization, which delayed the mother ship’s detection of the incident. Two days later the submarine was recovered by Japanese authorities, and Sakuma's journal was found, with a detailed analysis of what may have caused the accident, ending with an apology to Emperor Meiji for the loss of the submarine and 14 crew members before the ship's air ran out. The journal was posted in later press reports, and Sakuma became a posthumous national hero and an example for courage and steadfastness within the Imperial Japanese Navy.

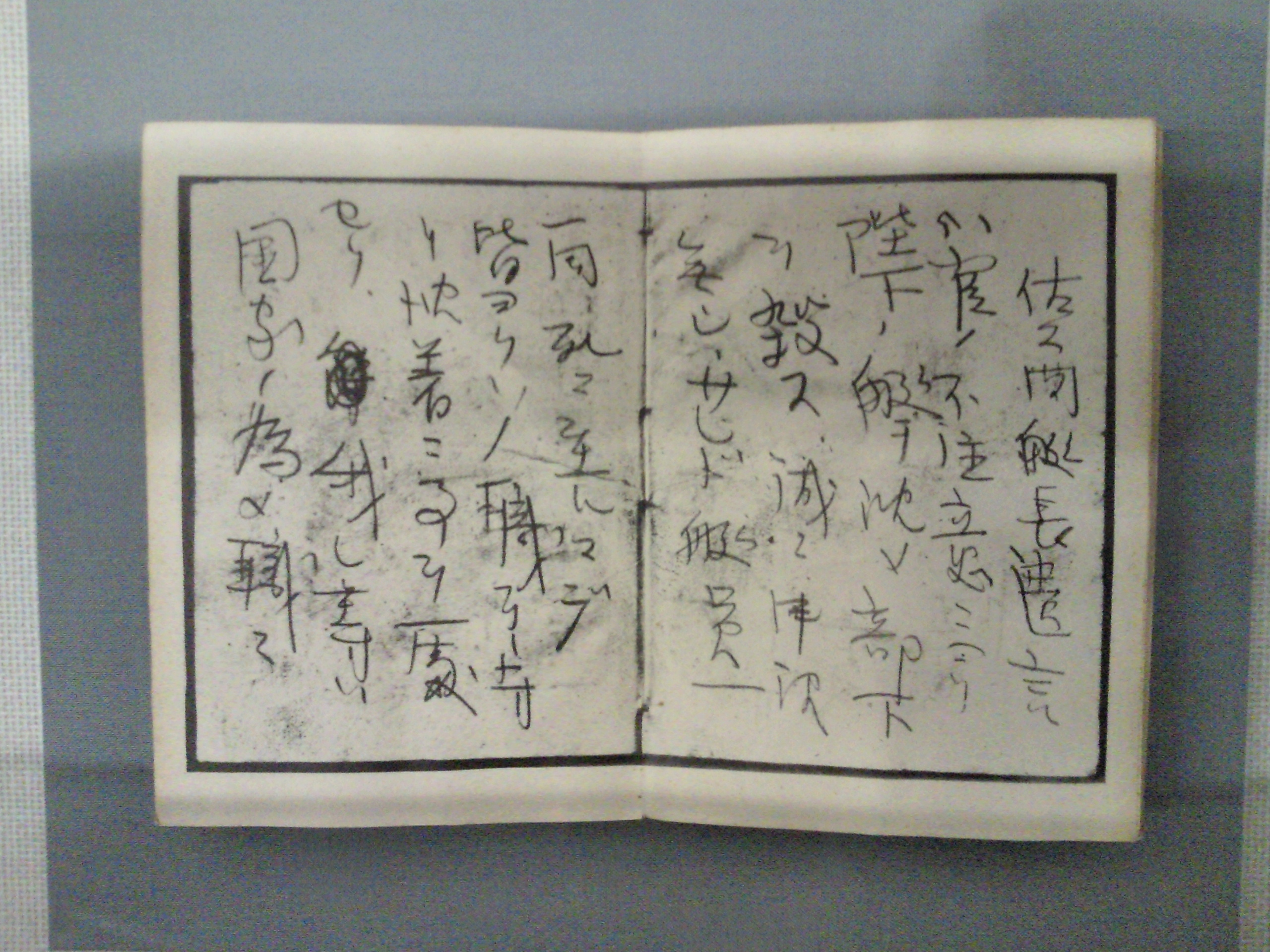
Sakuma's Journal
