= Japanese submarine Ro-54 =

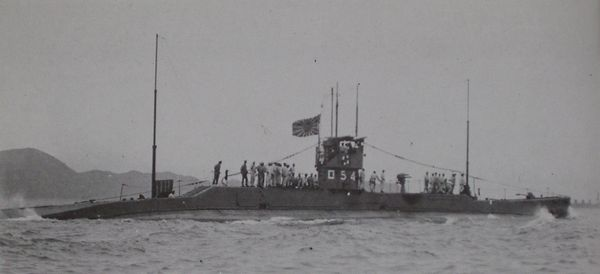
- Ro-54 during the 1920s, sometime after her name was changed from Submarine No. 28 to Ro-54 on 1 November 1924.

History

Japan
- Name: Submarine No. 28
- Builder: Mitsubishi, Kobe, Japan
- Laid down: 1 November 1919
- Launched: 13 October 1920
- Completed: 10 September 1921
- Commissioned: 10 September 1921
- Renamed: Ro-54 on 1 November 1924
- Decommissioned: 1 April 1926
- Recommissioned: 1 August 1926
- Decommissioned: 15 December 1938
- Stricken: 1 April 1940
- Fate: Hulked 1 April 1940
- Renamed: Haisen No. 12 on 1 April 1940

General characteristics
- Class & type: Japanese Type L submarine (L2 subclass)
- Displacement: 907 tonnes (893 long tons) surfaced; 1,093 tonnes (1,075.3 long tons) submerged
- Length: 70.59 m (231 ft 7 in) overall
- Beam: 7.16 m (23 ft 6 in)
- Draft: 3.94 m (12 ft 11 in)
- Installed power: 2,400 bhp (1,800 kW) (diesel); 1,600 shp (1,200 kW) (electric motor)
- Propulsion: Diesel-electric; 2 × Vickers diesel engines, 75 tons fuel; 2 × electric motor; 2 x shafts
- Speed: 17.3 knots (32.0 km/h; 19.9 mph) surfaced; 10.4 knots (19.3 km/h; 12.0 mph) submerged
- Range: 5,500 nmi (10,200 km; 6,300 mi) at 10 knots (19 km/h; 12 mph) surfaced; 80 nmi (150 km; 92 mi) at 4 knots (7.4 km/h; 4.6 mph) submerged
- Test depth: 60 m (197 ft)
- Crew: 45
- Armament: 4 × bow 450 mm (18 in) torpedo tubes; 8 x Type 44 torpedoes; 1 × 76.2 mm (3 in) gun

Ro-54, originally named Submarine No. 28, was an Imperial Japanese Navy Type L submarine of the L2 subclass. Except for a few months in 1926, she was in commission from 1921 to 1938.

== Design and description ==
The submarines of the Type L2 sub-class were close copies of the British L-class submarine built under license in Japan. They differed from the preceding L1 subclass in the deletion of the two broadside-firing torpedo tubes and the two torpedoes for them, the use of domestically produced diesel engines and batteries, and a different battery arrangement. They displaced 907 tonnes (893 long tons) surfaced and 1,093 tonnes (1,075.3 long tons) submerged. The submarines were 70.59 meters (231 ft 7 in) long and had a beam of 7.16 meters (23 ft 6 in) and a draft of 3.94 meters (12 ft 11 in). They had a diving depth of 60 meters (197 ft).

For surface running, the submarines were powered by two 1,200-brake-horsepower (895 kW) Vickers diesel engines, each driving one propeller shaft. When submerged, each propeller was driven by an 800-shaft-horsepower (597 kW) electric motor. They could reach 17.3 knots (32.0 km/h; 19.9 mph) on the surface and 10.4 knots (19.3 km/h; 12.0 mph) underwater. On the surface, they had a range of 5,500 nautical miles (10,200 km; 6,300 mi) at 10 knots (19 km/h; 12 mph); submerged, they had a range of 80 nmi (150 km; 92 mi) at 4 knots (7.4 km/h; 4.6 mph).

The submarines were armed with four internal 450 mm (18 in) torpedo tubes, all in the bow, and carried a total of eight Type 44 torpedoes. They were also armed with a single 76.2 mm (3 in) deck gun.

== Construction and commissioning ==
Ro-54 was laid down as Submarine No. 28 on 1 November 1919 by Mitsubishi at Kobe, Japan. Launched on 13 October 1920, she was completed and commissioned on 10 September 1921.

== Service history ==
Upon commissioning, Submarine No. 28 was attached to the Yokosuka Naval District. On 1 December 1921, she was reassigned to Submarine Division 4 in Submarine Squadron 1 in the 1st Fleet. She was renamed Ro-54 on 1 November 1924. Submarine Division 4 was reattached to the Yokosuka Naval District on 1 December 1925, and Ro-54 and was assigned that day to the Yokosuka Defense Division. She was decommissioned and placed in reserve on 1 April 1926.

Ro-54 was recommissioned on 1 August 1926, and was assigned to the Yokosuka Defense Division that day, serving in that duty until 1 December 1927. She later served in the Yokosuka Defense Division again from 30 November 1929 to 15 November 1934.

Ro-54 was decommissioned and placed in the Fourth Reserve in the Yokosuka Naval District on 15 December 1938. The Japanese struck her from the Navy list on 1 April 1940, and that day she became a stationary hulk with the name Haisen No. 12.

== Bibliography ==
- "Rekishi Gunzō"., History of Pacific War Extra, "Perfect guide, The submarines of the Imperial Japanese Forces", Gakken (Japan), March 2005, ISBN 4-05-603890-2
- The Maru Special, Japanese Naval Vessels No.43 Japanese Submarines III, Ushio Shobō (Japan), September 1980, Book code 68343-44
- The Maru Special, Japanese Naval Vessels No.132 Japanese Submarines I "Revised edition", Ushio Shobō (Japan), February 1988, Book code 68344-36
- The Maru Special, Japanese Naval Vessels No.133 Japanese Submarines II "Revised edition", Ushio Shobō (Japan), March 1988, Book code 68344-37
