= Japanese submarine Ro-56 (1921) =

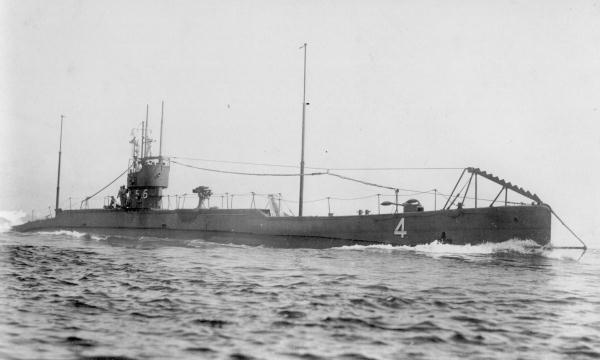
- Ro-56 ca. 1925, probably off Yokosuka, Japan.

History

Japan
- Name: Submarine No. 30
- Builder: Mitsubishi, Kobe, Japan
- Laid down: 10 July 1920
- Launched: 11 May 1921
- Completed: 16 January 1922
- Commissioned: 16 January 1922
- Renamed: Ro-56 on 1 November 1924
- Decommissioned: 1 April 1926
- Recommissioned: 1 August 1926
- Decommissioned: 15 December 1938
- Stricken: 1 April 1940
- Fate: Hulked 1 April 1940
- Renamed: Haisen No. 13 on 1 April 1940

General characteristics
- Class & type: Japanese Type L submarine (L2 subclass)
- Displacement: 907 tonnes (893 long tons) surfaced; 1,093 tonnes (1,075.3 long tons) submerged
- Length: 70.59 m (231 ft 7 in) overall
- Beam: 7.16 m (23 ft 6 in)
- Draft: 3.94 m (12 ft 11 in)
- Installed power: 2,400 bhp (1,800 kW) (diesel); 1,600 shp (1,200 kW) (electric motor)
- Propulsion: Diesel-electric; 2 × Vickers diesel engines, 75 tons fuel; 2 × electric motor; 2 x shafts
- Speed: 17.3 knots (32.0 km/h; 19.9 mph) surfaced; 10.4 knots (19.3 km/h; 12.0 mph) submerged
- Range: 5,500 nmi (10,200 km; 6,300 mi) at 10 knots (19 km/h; 12 mph) surfaced; 80 nmi (150 km; 92 mi) at 4 knots (7.4 km/h; 4.6 mph) submerged
- Test depth: 60 m (197 ft)
- Crew: 45
- Armament: 4 × bow 450 mm (18 in) torpedo tubes; 8 x Type 44 torpedoes; 1 × 76.2 mm (3 in) gun

The first Ro-56, originally named Submarine No. 30, was an Imperial Japanese Navy Type L submarine, the final unit of the L2 subclass. Except for a few months in 1926, she was in commission from 1922 to 1938.

== Design and description ==
The submarines of the Type L2 sub-class were close copies of the British L-class submarine built under license in Japan. They differed from the preceding L1 subclass in the deletion of the two broadside-firing torpedo tubes and the two torpedoes for them, the use of domestically produced diesel engines and batteries, and a different battery arrangement. They displaced 907 tonnes (893 long tons) surfaced and 1,093 tonnes (1,075.3 long tons) submerged. The submarines were 70.59 meters (231 ft 7 in) long and had a beam of 7.16 meters (23 ft 6 in) and a draft of 3.94 meters (12 ft 11 in). They had a diving depth of 60 meters (197 ft).

For surface running, the submarines were powered by two 1,200-brake-horsepower (895 kW) Vickers diesel engines, each driving one propeller shaft. When submerged, each propeller was driven by an 800-shaft-horsepower (597 kW) electric motor. They could reach 17.3 knots (32.0 km/h; 19.9 mph) on the surface and 10.4 knots (19.3 km/h; 12.0 mph) underwater. On the surface, they had a range of 5,500 nautical miles (10,200 km; 6,300 mi) at 10 knots (19 km/h; 12 mph); submerged, they had a range of 80 nmi (150 km; 92 mi) at 4 knots (7.4 km/h; 4.6 mph).

The submarines were armed with four internal 450 mm (18 in) torpedo tubes, all in the bow, and carried a total of eight Type 44 torpedoes. They were also armed with a single 76.2 mm (3 in) deck gun.

== Construction and commissioning ==
Ro-56 was laid down as Submarine No. 30 on 10 July 1920 by Mitsubishi at Kobe, Japan. Launched on 11 May 1921, she was completed and commissioned on 16 January 1922, the final unit of the L2 subclass.

== Service history ==
Upon commissioning, Submarine No. 30 was assigned to Submarine Division 4 — in which she spent her entire active career — in Submarine Squadron 1 in the 1st Fleet. She was renamed Ro-56 on 1 November 1924. Submarine Division 4 was attached to the Yokosuka Naval District on 1 December 1925, in which it remained for the remainder of Ro-56′s career. Ro-56 was assigned that day to the Yokosuka Defense Division. She was decommissioned and placed in reserve on 1 April 1926.

Ro-56 was recommissioned on 1 August 1926, and was assigned to the Yokosuka Defense Division again that day, serving in that duty until 1 December 1927. She later served in the Yokosuka Defense Division again from 30 November 1929 to 15 November 1934.

Ro-56 was decommissioned and placed in the Fourth Reserve in the Yokosuka Naval District on 15 December 1938. The Japanese struck her from the Navy list on 1 April 1940, and that day she became a stationary hulk with the name Haisen No. 13.

== Bibliography ==
- "Rekishi Gunzō"., History of Pacific War Extra, "Perfect guide, The submarines of the Imperial Japanese Forces", Gakken (Japan), March 2005, ISBN 4-05-603890-2
- The Maru Special, Japanese Naval Vessels No.43 Japanese Submarines III, Ushio Shobō (Japan), September 1980, Book code 68343-44
- The Maru Special, Japanese Naval Vessels No.132 Japanese Submarines I "Revised edition", Ushio Shobō (Japan), February 1988, Book code 68344-36
- The Maru Special, Japanese Naval Vessels No.133 Japanese Submarines II "Revised edition", Ushio Shobō (Japan), March 1988, Book code 68344-37
