= Japanese submarine Ro-52 =

Japanese Naval Submarine of L1 class

History

Japan
- Name: Submarine No. 26
- Builder: Mitsubishi, Kobe, Japan
- Laid down: 10 August 1918
- Launched: 9 March 1920
- Completed: 30 November 1920
- Commissioned: 30 November 1920
- Renamed: Ro-52 on 1 November 1924
- Decommissioned: 1 April 1932
- Stricken: 1 April 1932
- Fate: Decommissioned 1932

General characteristics
- Class & type: Japanese Type L submarine (L1 subclass)
- Displacement: 907 tonnes (893 long tons) surfaced; 1,092 tonnes (1,075.2 long tons) submerged
- Length: 70.59 m (231 ft 7 in) overall
- Beam: 7.16 m (23 ft 6 in)
- Draft: 3.90 m (12 ft 10 in)
- Installed power: 2,400 bhp (1,800 kW) (diesel); 1,600 shp (1,200 kW) (electric motor)
- Propulsion: Diesel-electric; 2 × Vickers diesel engines, 75 tons fuel; 2 × electric motor; 2 x shafts
- Speed: 17 knots (31 km/h; 20 mph) surfaced; 10.2 knots (18.9 km/h; 11.7 mph) submerged
- Range: 5,500 nmi (10,200 km; 6,300 mi) at 10 knots (19 km/h; 12 mph) surfaced; 80 nmi (150 km; 92 mi) at 4 knots (7.4 km/h; 4.6 mph) submerged
- Test depth: 60 m (197 ft)
- Crew: 45
- Armament: 6 × 450 mm (18 in) torpedo tubes (4 x bow, 2 x broadside); 10 x Type 44 torpedoes; 1 × 76.2 mm (3 in) gun

Ro-52, originally named Submarine No. 26, was an Imperial Japanese Navy Type L submarine of the L1 subclass. She was commissioned in 1920, sank accidentally in 1923 and again in 1925, was refloated and repaired each time, and was decommissioned in 1932.

== Design and description ==
The submarines of the Type L1 sub-class were copies of the Group 1 subclass of the British L-class submarine built under license in Japan with technical supervision by the British firm Vickers. The Imperial Japanese Navy procured them in order to acquire advanced British submarine technology, as well as the highly reliable Vickers diesel engines that powered the Type L1 submarines. They displaced 907 tonnes (893 long tons) surfaced and 1,092 tonnes (1,075.2 long tons) submerged. The submarines were 70.59 meters (231 ft 7 in) long and had a beam of 7.16 meters (23 ft 6 in) and a draft of 3.90 meters (12 ft 10 in). They had a diving depth of 60 meters (197 ft).

For surface running, the submarines were powered by two 1,200-brake-horsepower (895 kW) Vickers diesel engines, each driving one propeller shaft. When submerged each propeller was driven by an 800-shaft-horsepower (597 kW) electric motor. They could reach 17 knots (31 km/h; 20 mph) on the surface and 10.2 knots (18.9 km/h; 11.7 mph) underwater. On the surface, they had a range of 5,500 nautical miles (10,200 km; 6,300 mi) at 10 knots (19 km/h; 12 mph); submerged, they had a range of 80 nmi (150 km; 92 mi) at 4 knots (7.4 km/h; 4.6 mph).

The submarines were armed with six internal 450 mm (18 in) torpedo tubes — four in the bow and two mounted athwartships and firing on the broadside — and carried a total of ten Type 44 torpedoes. They were also armed with a single 76.2 mm (3 in) gun deck gun.

== Construction and commissioning ==
Ro-52 was laid down as Submarine No. 26 on 10 August 1918 by Mitsubishi at Kobe, Japan. Launched on 9 March 1920, she was completed and commissioned on 30 November 1920.

== Service history ==
Upon commissioning, Submarine No. 26 was attached to the Yokosuka Naval District and assigned to Submarine Division 3. On 1 December 1920, Submarine Division 3 was assigned to Submarine Squadron 1 in the 1st Fleet. Submarine Division 3 was reattached to the Yokosuka Naval District on 1 December 1921 and was assigned that day to the Yokosuka Defense Division, then was reassigned on 1 June 1922 to the Ominato Defense Division. On 1 December 1922, Submarine No. 26 was attached to the Kure Naval District and reassigned to Submarine Division 11, in both of which she remained for the rest of her active career. She was assigned to the Kure Defense Division on 1 December 1922.

On 13 March 1923, Submarine No.26 collided with the steamer Ryosei Maru off Hiroshima, Japan. On 29 October 1923, Submarine No. 26 was moored to a buoy alongside the protected cruiser Yahagi in the harbor at Kure, Japan, during a memorial service for Submarine No. 70— which had sunk in August 1923 with heavy loss of life — with the admiral commanding the Kure Naval District in attendance when she suddenly began to sink rapidly by the bow. She struck the buoy, then began to sink quickly by the stern, and within 20 minutes she had settled on the bottom at a depth of 8 fathoms (48 ft; 15 m) with only her periscope and Wireless mast protruding above the surface. Her entire crew survived the sinking and another submarine′s crew rescued everyone who had been aboard. In its immediate aftermath, the sinking was attributed to flooding in a water tank, but the investigation into the incident concluded that she sank when her torpedo tube doors opened accidentally. Plans were made immediately to salvage her, without any particular difficulties anticipated. She was refloated on 17 November 1923, repaired, and returned to service.

Submarine No. 26′s duty in the Kure Guard District ended on 1 December 1923, but she continued to serve in the Kure Naval District and was renamed Ro-52 on 1 November 1924. On 29 October 1925, Ro-52 sank again without loss of life while tied up at a pier because of flooding through a torpedo tube that an investigation attributed to carelessness. She again was refloated and repaired. She was decommissioned and stricken from the Navy list on 1 April 1932.

== Bibliography ==
- "Rekishi Gunzō"., History of Pacific War Extra, "Perfect guide, The submarines of the Imperial Japanese Forces", Gakken (Japan), March 2005, ISBN 4-05-603890-2
- The Maru Special, Japanese Naval Vessels No.43 Japanese Submarines III, Ushio Shobō (Japan), September 1980, Book code 68343-44
- The Maru Special, Japanese Naval Vessels No.132 Japanese Submarines I "Revised edition", Ushio Shobō (Japan), February 1988, Book code 68344-36
- The Maru Special, Japanese Naval Vessels No.133 Japanese Submarines II "Revised edition", Ushio Shobō (Japan), March 1988, Book code 68344-37
