= List of ship launches in 1921 =

The list of ship launches in 1921 includes a chronological list of some ships launched in 1921.

Date	Ship	Class / type	Builder	Location	Country	Notes
5 January	S-40	S-class submarine	Bethlehem Shipbuilding Corporation	San Francisco, California	United States	For United States Navy
11 January	Leighton	Cargo ship	Harland & Wolff	Belfast	United Kingdom	For Lamport & Holt.
18 January	Swiftarrow	Tanker	Northwest Bridge & Iron Company	Portland, Oregon	United States	For USSB/Swiftsure Oil Transport Co.
25 January	Rio Azul	Cargo ship	Blyth Shipbuilding & Dry Docks Co. Ltd	Blyth	United Kingdom	For Thompson Steam Shipping Co. Ltd.
5 February	Swiftstar	Tanker	Northwest Bridge & Iron Company	Portland, Oregon	United States	For USSB/Swiftsure Oil Transport Co.
7 February	S-11	S-class submarine	Portsmouth Navy Yard	Kittery, Maine	United States	For United States Navy
10 February	Elizabeth Stoner	Cargo ship	John I. Thornycroft & Company	Southampton	United Kingdom	For J. Stoner & Co., Southampton
10 February	Submarine No. 29 (Ro-55)	Type L2 submarine	Mitsubishi	Kobe	Japan	For Imperial Japanese Navy
12 February	Leise Maersk	Cargo ship	Odense Steel Shipyard	Odense, Denmark	Denmark	For Maersk
21 February	S-41	S-class submarine	Bethlehem Shipbuilding Corporation	San Francisco, California	United States	For United States Navy
24 February	Doric Star	Cargo liner	Lithgows Ltd.	Port Glasgow	UKGBI	For Blue Star Line.
24 February	Submarine No. 34 (Ro-17)	Kaichū III-type submarine	Kure Naval Arsenal	Kure	Japan	For Imperial Japanese Navy
24 February	Columbia	Dredge	Pacific Marine Iron Works	Portland	United States	For Port of Portland
3 March	Sheaf Garth	Cargo ship	Blyth Shipbuilding & Dry Docks Co. Ltd	Blyth	United Kingdom	For Sheaf Steam Shipping Co. Ltd.
8 March	Malia	Cargo ship	William Hamilton and Company	Port Glasgow	United Kingdom	For Brocklebank Line
9 March	Windsor Castle	Passenger ship	Harland & Wolff	Belfast	United Kingdom	For Union-Castle Line.
10 March	Losada	Cargo ship	Harland & Wolff	Belfast	United Kingdom	For Pacific Steam Navigation Company.
10 March	Submarine No. 31 (Ro-3)	Type F2 submarine	Kawasaki	Kobe	Japan	For Imperial Japanese Navy
12 March	Swiftscout	Tanker	Northwest Bridge & Iron Company	Portland, Oregon	United States	For USSB/Swiftsure Oil Transport Co.
22 March	Colorado	Colorado-class battleship	New York Shipbuilding Corporation	Camden, New Jersey	United States	For United States Navy
23 March	Coniston	Coaster	I. J. Abdela & Mitchell Ltd.	Queensferry	United Kingdom	For J. G. Frew & Co.
25 March	Nashaba	Cargo ship	Pacific Coast Shipbuilding Company	Bay Point, California	United States	For United States Shipping Board
25 March	Submarine No. 35 (Ro-18)	Kaichū III-type submarine	Kure Naval Arsenal	Kure	Japan	For Imperial Japanese Navy
6 April	Mark Brandenburg	Fishing trawler	J. C. Tecklenborg	Geestemünde	Germany	For Hochseefischerei Groß Berlin
9 April	Laconia	Ocean liner	Swan Hunter & Wigham Richardson	Wallsend	United Kingdom	
9 April	Swifteagle	Tanker	Northwest Bridge & Iron Company	Portland, Oregon	United States	For USSB/Swiftsure Oil Transport Co.
14 April	Francunion	Oil barge	Harland & Wolff	Belfast	United Kingdom	For British Union Oil Co.
22 April	Submarine No. 27 (Ro-16)	Kaichū III-type submarine	Kure Naval Arsenal	Kure	Japan	For Imperial Japanese Navy
11 May	Submarine No. 30 (Ro-56)	Type L2 submarine	Mitsubishi	Kobe	Japan	For Imperial Japanese Navy
19 May	Elisabethville	Cargo liner	J Cockerill SA	Hoboken	Belgium	For Compagnie Belge Maritime du Congo
23 May	Cincinnati	Omaha-class cruiser	Todd Drydock and Construction Company	Tacoma, Washington	United States	For United States Navy
24 May	Shell-Mex 5	Tanker	I. J. Abdela & Mitchell Ltd.	Queensferry	United Kingdom	For Shell-Mex Ltd.
May	3 unnamed vessels	Barges	Alabama Drydock and Shipbuilding Company	Mobile, Alabama	United States	For R. W. Hillcoat & Co.
2 June	B-1	B-class submarine	SECN	Cartagena	Spain	For Spanish Navy.
7 June	A. B. Gowan	Ferry	Amble Shipbuilding Co. Ltd.	Amble	United Kingdom	For Jarrow Corporation.
9 June	Inverurie	Tanker	Harland & Wolff	Belfast	United Kingdom	For British Mexican Petroleum Company.
16 June	Stegg	Trygg-class torpedo boat	Naval Shipyard	Horten	Norway	For Royal Norwegian Navy
16 June	H. T. Harper	Tanker	Moore Shipbuilding Company	Oakland, California	United States	For Standard Oil Company of California
22 June	Submarine No. 32 (Ro-4)	Type F2 submarine	Kawasaki	Kobe	Japan	For Imperial Japanese Navy
June	West Greylock	Cargo ship	Los Angeles Shipbuilding and Dry Dock Company	San Pedro, California	United States	For United States Shipping Board
2 July	Tamiahua	Tanker	Moore Shipbuilding Company	Oakland, California	United States	
9 July	Suomen Poika	Cargo ship	Sandvikens Skeppsdocka och Mekaniska Verkstad	Helsinki	Finland	For Suomen Valtamerentakainen Kauppa Oy
9 July	Birkenhead	Tanker	Moore Shipbuilding Company	Oakland, California	United States	For Vacuum Oil Company
21 July	Aurora	Tanker	I. J. Abdela & Mitchell Ltd.	Queensferry	United Kingdom	For Eagle Oil Transport Co. Ltd.
22 July	Anglo-Mex 101	Tug	Amble Shipbuilding Co. Ltd.	Amble	United Kingdom	For Anglo-Mexican Petroleum Co. Ltd.
28 July	F. H. Hillman	Tanker	Alameda Works Shipyard	Alameda, California	United States	For Standard Oil Company of California
30 July	West Prospect	Cargo ship	Los Angeles Shipbuilding and Dry Dock Company	San Pedro, California	United States	For United States Shipping Board
4 August	S-12	S-class submarine	Portsmouth Navy Yard	Kittery, Maine	United States	For United States Navy
5 August	Lochkatrine	Passenger ship	Harland & Wolff	Belfast	United Kingdom	For Royal Mail Line.
6 August	Knoxville City	Cargo ship	Chickasaw Shipbuilding and Car Company	Chickasaw, Alabama	United States	
18 August	Bellbro	Cargo ship	Blyth Shipbuilding & Dry Docks Co. Ltd	Blyth	United Kingdom	For Halifax Shipping Co. Ltd.
20 August	A.M.P. 3	Barge	Amble Shipbuilding Co. Ltd.	Amble	United Kingdom	For Anglo-Mexican Petroleum Co. Ltd.
20 August	John D. Archbold	Tanker	Newport News Shipbuilding	Newport News, Virginia	United States	
1 September	Dinteldyk	Cargo ship	Harland & Wolff	Belfast	United Kingdom	For Holland America Line.
1 September	Ramsay	Cargo ship	Bartram & Sons	South Dock, Sunderland	United Kingdom	
1 September	Rendsburg	Fishing trawler	H. C. Stülcken Sohn	Hamburg	Germany	For N. Ebeling
1 September	Washington	Colorado-class battleship	New York Shipbuilding Corporation	Camden, New Jersey	United States	For United States Navy; Cancelled after signing of Washington Naval Treaty
3 September	Shell-Mex 4	Tanker	I. J. Abdela & Mitchell Ltd.	Queensferry	United Kingdom	For Shell-Mex Ltd.
3 September	Suomen Neito	Cargo ship	Sandvikens Skeppsdocka och Mekaniska Verkstad	Helsinki	Finland	For Suomen Valtamerentakainen Kauppa Oy
7 September	Mojave	Coast Guard cutter	Union Construction Company	Oakland, California	United States	
10 September	La Purisima	Tanker	Southwestern Shipbuilding Company	San Pedro, California	United States	For Union Oil Company
12 September	Chattanooga City	Cargo ship	Chickasaw Shipbuilding and Car Company	Chickasaw, Alabama	United States	
14 September	Empire Arrow	Tanker	New York Shipbuilding Corporation	Camden, New Jersey	United States	For Standard Transportation Co Inc.
17 September	Submarine No. 33 (Ro-5)	Type F2 submarine	Kawasaki	Kobe	Japan	For Imperial Japanese Navy
19 September	West Chopaka	Cargo ship	Los Angeles Shipbuilding and Dry Dock Company	San Pedro, California	United States	For United States Shipping Board
22 September	Sophocles	Passenger ship	Harland & Wolff	Belfast	United Kingdom	For Aberdeen Line.
28 September	Madura	Cargo liner	Barclay Curle	Glasgow	United Kingdom	British India Steam Navigation Company
29 September	Richmond	Omaha-class cruiser	New York Shipbuilding Corporation	Camden, New Jersey	United States	For United States Navy
29 September	Dixie Arrow	Arrow-class oil tanker	New York Shipbuilding Corporation	Camden, New Jersey	United States	For Standard Transportation Company
4 October	Linnell	Cargo ship	Harland & Wolff	Belfast	United Kingdom	For Lamport & Holt.
4 October	Rio Blanco	Cargo ship	Blyth Shipbuilding & Dry Docks Co. Ltd	Blyth	United Kingdom	For Thompson Steam Shipping Co. Ltd.
10 October	B-2	B-class submarine	SECN	Cartagena	Spain	For Spanish Navy.
14 October	Cumberland	Tank barge	Frederick Braby & Co. Ltd.	Deptford	United Kingdom	For Anglo-American Oil Company Ltd.
15 October	Submarine No. 40 (Ro-22)	Kaichū III-type submarine	Yokosuka Naval Arsenal	Yokosuka	Japan	For Imperial Japanese Navy
17 October	Anglo-Mex	Tug	Amble Shipbuilding Co. Ltd.	Amble	United Kingdom	For Anglo-Mexican Petroleum Co. Ltd.
18 October	Submarine No. 45 (Ro-26)	Kaichū IV-type submarine	Sasebo Naval Arsenal	Sasebo	Japan	For Imperial Japanese Navy
20 October	S-13	S-class submarine	Portsmouth Navy Yard	Kittery, Maine	United States	For United States Navy
25 October	Submarine No. 41 (Ro-23)	Kaichū III-type submarine	Yokosuka Naval Arsenal	Yokosuka	Japan	For Imperial Japanese Navy
29 October	Decatur	Clemson-class destroyer	Mare Island Naval Shipyard	Vallejo, California	United States	For United States Navy
29 October	Perry	Clemson-class destroyer	Mare Island Naval Shipyard	Vallejo, California	United States	For United States Navy
3 November	Barrabool	Passenger ship	Harland & Wolff	Belfast	United Kingdom	For Peninsular & Orient Steam Navigation Company.
8 November	Mécanicien Principal Carvin	Cargo ship	Forges et Chantiers de la Gironde	Lormont	France	For: French Government
15 November	A.M.P. 20	Barge	Amble Shipbuilding Co. Ltd.	Amble	United Kingdom	For Anglo-Mexican Petroleum Co. Ltd.
17 November	West Virginia	Colorado-class battleship	Newport News Shipbuilding	Newport News, Virginia	United States	For United States Navy
21 November	Royal Firth	Coaster	Brown's Shipbuilding & Dry Dock Co. Ltd	Hull	United Kingdom	For Border Shipping Co. Ltd.
28 November	Hauraki	Cargo liner	William Denny and Brothers	Dumbarton	United Kingdom	For Union Steam Ship Company of New Zealand Limited
29 November	Submarine No. 44 (I-51)	Kaidai I-type submarine	Kure Naval Arsenal	Kure	Japan	For Imperial Japanese Navy
3 December	Submarine No. 46 (Ro-57)	Type L3 submarine	Mitsubishi	Kobe	Japan	For Imperial Japanese Navy
14 December	Missourian	Cargo ship	Merchant Shipbuilding Corporation	Chester, Pennsylvania	United States	For American-Hawaiian Steamship Company
15 December	Concord	Omaha-class cruiser	William Cramp & Sons	Philadelphia, Pennsylvania	United States	For United States Navy
17 December	Capitaine Boudsin	Cargo ship	Forges et Chantiers de la Gironde	Lormont	France	For: French Government
December	Northumberland	Tank barge	Frederick Braby & Co. Ltd.	Deptford	United Kingdom	For Anglo-American Oil Company Ltd.
Unknown date	Abington	Coaster	Brown's Shipbuilding & Dry Dock Co. Ltd	Hull	United Kingdom	For Cheviot Coasters Ltd.
Unknown date	Antonia	Refrigerated cargo liner	Vickers-Armstrongs Ltd.	Barrow-in-Furness	United Kingdom	For Cunard Line.
Unknown date	Antonio Delfino	Passenger ship	Vulkan Werke.	Hamburg	Germany	For Hamburg South America Line.
Unknown date	Artena	Cargo ship	Cantiere Officine Savoia	Genoa	Italy	For private owner.
Unknown date	Bianca	Cargo ship	Hamburg-Elbe Schiffs.	Hamburg	Germany	For private owner.
Unknown date	Canadian Commander	Cargo ship	Canadian Vickers Ltd	Montreal	Canada	For private owner.
Unknown date	Canadian Traveller	Cargo ship	Harbour Marine Ltd.	Victoria	Canada	For private owner.
Unknown date	Dalewood	Cargo ship	Eltringham's Ltd	Willington on Tyne	United Kingdom	W France, Fenwick & Co Ltd
Unknown date	Duchessa D'Aosta	Cargo ship	Stabilimento Tecnino Triestino.	Trieste	Italy	For lloyd Triestino.
Unknown date	Elbe	Cargo ship	Nobiskrug Werft GmbH	Rendsburg	Germany	For Bugsier Reederei & Bergungs AG
Unknown date	Günther Russ	Coaster	Stettiner Oderwerke AG	Stettin	Germany	For Schiffart-und Assekuranz Gesellschaft GmbH
Unknown date	Hagen	Cargo ship	Vulkan Werft	Hamburg	Germany	For Hamburg America Line.
Unknown date	Johannes C Russ	Coaster	Stettiner Oderwerke AG	Stettin	Germany	For Schiffart-und Assekuranz Gesellschaft GmbH
Unknown date	Julius Schindler	Tanker	Deutsche Werft.	Hamburg	Germany	For private owner.
Unknown date	London	Passenger ship	Hawthorns & Co. Ltd.	Leith	United Kingdom	For Dundee, Perth & London Shipping Co.
Unknown date	Margarethe	Schooner	Deutsche Werke	Kiel	Germany	For Ernst Simon AG
Unknown date	Marienfels	Cargo ship	Joh. C. Tecklenborg	Wesermünde	Germany	For Hansa Line.
Unknown date	Martha Hemsoth	Cargo ship	Deutsche Werke.	Kiel	Germany	For private owner.
Unknown date	Mincio	Cargo ship	Cantiere Cerusa	Voltri	Italy	Pietro Ravano Fu Marco
Unknown date	Possehl	Cargo ship	Howaldtswerke	Kiel	Germany	Lübeck Line
Unknown date	Samaria	Passenger ship	Cammell Laird & Co. Ltd.	Birkenhead	United Kingdom	For Cunard Line.
Unknown date	Sandown Castle	Cargo ship	Short Brothers Ltd.	Sunderland	United Kingdom	For Union-Castle Mail Steamship Co. Ltd.
Unknown date	Vindeggen	Cargo ship	Armstrong, Whitworth & Ci.	Newcastle upon Tyne	United Kingdom	For private owner.
Unknown date	Wartenfels	Cargo ship	Joh. C. Tecklenborg.	Wesermünde	Germany	For Hansa Line.
Unknown date	Wilhelm Russ	Coaster	Stettiner Oderwerke	Stettin	Germany	Schiffart-und Assekuranz Gesellschaft GmbH
