= List of ship launches in 1920 =

The list of ship launches in 1920 includes a chronological list of ships launched in 1920. In cases where no official launching ceremony was held, the date built or completed may be used instead.

Date	Ship	Class and type	Builder	Location	Country	Notes
6 January	Lunéville	Amiens-class sloop	Forges et Chantiers de la Méditerranée	La Seyne	France	For: French Navy
12 January	Ekari	Cargo ship	Harland & Wolff	Belfast	United Kingdom	For Elder Dempster.
28 January	Craonne	Amiens-class sloop	Forges et Chantiers de la Méditerranée	La Seyne	France	For: French Navy
18 February	Cuprum	Cargo ship	Pacific Coast Shipbuilding Company	Bay Point, California	United States	For United States Shipping Board
24 February	Abel P. Upshur	Clemson-class destroyer	Newport News Shipbuilding	Newport News, Virginia	United States	For United States Navy.
February	Indorita	Coaster	I. J. Abdela & Mitchell Ltd.	Queensferry	United Kingdom	For John Summers & Sons Ltd.
3 March	Sydney Lasry	Cargo ship	Burntisland Shipbuilding Company	Burntisland, Fife	United Kingdom	For Compagnie Lasry
6 March	Hebe	Cargo ship	Blyth Shipbuilding & Dry Docks Co. Ltd	Blyth	United Kingdom	For Sociètè Navale Caennaise.
9 March	Submarine No. 26 (Ro-52)	Type L1 submarine	Mitsubishi	Kobe	Japan	For Imperial Japanese Navy
16 March	Liévin	Amiens-class sloop	Forges et Chantiers de la Méditerranée	La Seyne	France	For: French Navy
20 March	Maryland	Colorado-class battleship	Newport News Shipbuilding	Newport News, Virginia	United States	For United States Navy
21 March	Peronne	Amiens-class sloop	Forges et Chantiers de la Méditerranée	Le Havre	France	For: French Navy
25 March	Oliva	Fishing trawler	Werft Nobiskrug GmbH	Rendsburg	Germany	For Hochseefischerei Trave
25 March	War Pageant	N-type cargo ship	Harland & Wolff	Belfast	United Kingdom	For Elder Dempster.
March	Scythia	Cargo liner	Vickers-Armstrongs Ltd.	Barrow-in-Furness	United Kingdom	For Cunard Line.
7 April	Britmex No.6	Oil barge	Harland & Wolff	Belfast	United Kingdom	For British Mexican Petroleum Company.
7 April	Britmex No.7	Oil barge	Harland & Wolff	Belfast	United Kingdom	For British Mexican Petroleum Company.
15 April	Britmex No.2	Oil barge	Harland & Wolff	Belfast	United Kingdom	For British Mexican Petroleum Company.
15 April	Britmex No.3	Oil barge	Harland & Wolff	Belfast	United Kingdom	For British Mexican Petroleum Company.
15 April	Béarn	Normandie-class battleship	Forges et Chantiers de la Méditerranée	La Seyne	France	For French Navy
15 April	Glenogle	Cargo ship	Harland & Wolff	Belfast	United Kingdom	For Glen Line.
20 April	Versailles	Screw steamer	Forges et Chantiers de la Méditerranée	Le Havre	France	For: Chemins de Fer de l'État Français
21 April	Sepulga	Patoka-class oiler	Newport News Shipbuilding	Newport News, Virginia	United States	For United States Navy
22 April	Britmex No.8	Oil barge	Harland & Wolff	Belfast	United Kingdom	For British Mexican Petroleum Company.
22 April	Dorsetshire	Cargo ship	Harland & Wolff	Belfast	United Kingdom	For Bibby Steamship Co.
29 April	Britmex No.4	Oil barge	Harland & Wolff	Belfast	United Kingdom	For British Mexican Petroleum Company.
29 April	Britmex No.5	Oil barge	Harland & Wolff	Belfast	United Kingdom	For British Mexican Petroleum Company.
April	Eldorita	Coaster	I. J. Abdela & Mitchell Ltd.	Queensferry	United Kingdom	For John Summers & Sons Ltd.
5 May	Salinas	Patoka-class oiler	Newport News Shipbuilding	Newport News, Virginia	United States	For United States Navy
6 May	La Paz	Cargo ship	Harland & Wolff	Belfast	United Kingdom	For Pacific Steam Navigation Company.
7 May	Niobe	Cargo ship	Blyth Shipbuilding & Dry Docks Co. Ltd	Blyth	United Kingdom	For G. Lamy & Cie.
5 June	Tippecanoe	Patoka-class oiler	Newport News Shipbuilding	Newport News, Virginia	United States	For United States Navy
10 June	Bachi	Cargo ship	Blyth Shipbuilding & Dry Docks Co. Ltd	Blyth	United Kingdom	For Hijos de Astigarraga.
17 June	Bonheur	A-type cargo ship	Harland & Wolff	Belfast	United Kingdom	For Lamport & Holt.
17 June	Mondement	Amiens-class sloop	Forges et Chantiers de la Méditerranée	La Seyne	France	For: French Navy
1 July	War Bamboo	A-type cargo ship	Harland & Wolff	Belfast	United Kingdom	For British Shipping Controller.
3 July	Trinity	Patoka-class oiler	Newport News Shipbuilding	Newport News, Virginia	United States	For United States Navy
6 July	Submarine No. 27 (Ro-53)	Type L2 submarine	Mitsubishi	Kobe	Japan	For Imperial Japanese Navy
13 July	Inveritchen	Tanker	Harland & Wolff	Govan	United Kingdom	For British Mexican Petroleum Company.
14 July	Glenapp	Cargo ship	Harland & Wolff	Belfast	United Kingdom	For Glen Line.
17 July	Cornish Trader	Coaster	I. J. Abdela & Mitchell Ltd.	Queensferry	United Kingdom	For Cornish Traders Ltd.
17 July	Submarine No. 43 (Ro-25)	Kaichū III-type submarine	Sasebo Naval Arsenal	Sasebo	Japan	For Imperial Japanese Navy
30 July	Maudie	Tanker	Lithgows	Port Glasgow	United Kingdom	For A/S Hvalen
31 July	Française	Cargo ship	Blyth Shipbuilding & Dry Docks Co. Ltd	Blyth	United Kingdom	For Fernand Bouet.
2 August	Namasket	Cargo ship	Pacific Coast Shipbuilding Company	Bay Point, California	United States	For United States Shipping Board
26 August	Inverleith	Tanker	Harland & Wolff	Belfast	United Kingdom	For British Mexican Petroleum Company.
27 August	Calgary	Refrigerated cargo ship	Harland & Wolff	Belfast	United Kingdom	For Elder Dempster.
9 September	Inverampton	Tanker	Harland & Wolff	Govan	United Kingdom	For British Mexican Petroleum Company.
12 September	Montmirail	Amiens-class sloop	Forges et Chantiers de la Méditerranée	La Seyne	France	For: French Navy
20 September	Griffdu	Cargo ship	J. F. Duthie & Company	Seattle, Washington	United States	For Universal Steamship & Barge Co.
28 September	Delfina	Cargo ship	Blyth Shipbuilding & Dry Docks Co. Ltd	Blyth	United Kingdom	For F. Sainz e Inchaustegui.
28 September	Mary Nickerson	Coaster	I. J. Abdela & Mitchell Ltd.	Queensferry	United Kingdom	For Moffat Steamship Co. Ltd.
30 September	Glengarry	Cargo ship	Harland & Wolff	Belfast	United Kingdom	For Glen Line.
11 October	Le Puissant	Trawler	Forges et Chantiers de la Méditerranée	Le Havre	France	For: French Government (Secrétariat d’État au Ravitaillement)
13 October	Eastney	Cargo ship	Northumberland Shipbuilding Co. Ltd.	Newcastle upon Tyne	United Kingdom	For Romney Steamship Co. Ltd.
13 October	Submarine No. 28 (Ro-54)	Type L2 submarine	Mitsubishi	Kobe	Japan	For Imperial Japanese Navy
14 October	Lobos	Cargo ship	Harland & Wolff	Belfast	United Kingdom	For Pacific Steam Navigation Company.
14 October	Redbreast	Coaster	Harland & Wolff	Belfast	United Kingdom	For Coast Lines.
14 October	Submarine No. 24 (Ro-15)	Kaichū II-type submarine	Kure Naval Arsenal	Kure	Japan	For Imperial Japanese Navy
26 October	Submarine No. 38 (Ro-20)	Kaichū III-type submarine	Yokosuka Naval Arsenal	Yokosuka	Japan	For Imperial Japanese Navy
26 October	Submarine No. 39 (Ro-21)	Kaichū III-type submarine	Yokosuka Naval Arsenal	Yokosuka	Japan	For Imperial Japanese Navy
28 October	SS Bompata (1920)	B-type cargo ship	Harland & Wolff	Belfast	United Kingdom	For Elder Dempster.
30 October	Britmex No.1	Oil barge	Harland & Wolff	Belfast	United Kingdom	For British Mexican Petroleum Company.
30 October	Britmex No.9	Oil barge	Harland & Wolff	Belfast	United Kingdom	For British Mexican Petroleum Company.
11 November	Pittsburgh	Ocean liner	Harland & Wolff	Belfast	United Kingdom	For International Navigation Company.
25 November	Caennaise	Cargo ship	Blyth Shipbuilding & Dry Docks Co. Ltd	Blyth	United Kingdom	For Fernand Bouet.
27 November	Baradine	Passenger ship	Harland & Wolff	Belfast	United Kingdom	For Peninsular & Oriental Steam Navigation Company.
29 November	Lady Valentia	Coaster	Harland & Wolff	Belfast	United Kingdom	For Coast Lines.
14 December	Omaha	Omaha-class cruiser	Todd Dry Dock and Construction Company		United States	For United States Navy
15 December	Swiftsure	Tanker	Northwest Bridge & Iron Company	Portland, Oregon	United States	For USSB/Swiftsure Oil Transport Co.
16 December	Britmex No.10	Oil barge	Harland & Wolff	Belfast	United Kingdom	For British Mexican Petroleum Company.
16 December	Oroya	Passenger ship	Harland & Wolff	Belfast	United Kingdom	For Pacific Steam Navigation Company.
16 December	L'Auroch	Steel, screw steam tug; 352 GRT	Forges et Chantiers de la Méditerranée	Le Havre	France	For: French Government (Secrétariat d’État au Ravitaillement)
20 December	Faust	Coaster	Schiffbau-Gesellschaft Unterweser AG	Bremen	Germany	For H Dauelsberg
20 December	Gorilla	Coaster	Harland & Wolff	Belfast	United Kingdom	For Coast Lines.
22 December	Meanticut	Cargo ship	Pacific Coast Shipbuilding Company	Bay Point, California	United States	For United States Shipping Board
23 December	Magnava	Passenger ship	Barclay Curle	Scotstoun	United Kingdom	For British India Steam Navigation Company
23 December	Corvus	Cargo ship	Kjøbenhavns Flydedol & Skibsværft	Copenhagen	Denmark	For Det Bergenske Dampskibsselskab
25 December	Glenbeg	Cargo ship	Harland & Wolff	Belfast	United Kingdom	For Glen Line.
28 December	Britmex No.11	Oil barge	Harland & Wolff	Belfast	United Kingdom	For British Mexican Petroleum Company.
28 December	Cochrane	Refrigerated cargo ship	Harland & Wolff	Belfast	United Kingdom	For Elder Dempster.
28 December	Submarine No. 36 (Ro-19)	Kaichū III-type submarine	Kure Naval Arsenal	Kure	Japan	For Imperial Japanese Navy
Unknown date	Alness	Cargo ship	Ropner & Sons	Sunderland	United Kingdom	For private owner.
Unknown date	Ansaldo VIII	Cargo ship	Societa per Azioni Ansaldo	Sestri Ponente	Italy	For private owner.
Unknown date	Tring	Tug	Bushell Bros.	Bess	United Kingdom	For London Haulage Co Ltd.
Unknown date	Calumet	Hog Islander	American International Shipbuilding,	Hog Island, Philadelphia, Pennsylvania	United States	For United States Shipping Board
Unknown date	Canadian Commander	Refrigerated cargo ship	Canadian Vickers	Montreal	Canada	For Canadian National Steamships
Unknown date	Chimera	Steam drifter	Brown's Shipbuilding & Dry Dock Co. Ltd	Hull	United Kingdom	For private owner.
Unknown date	Darien	Coal barge	Alabama Drydock and Shipbuilding Company	Mobile, Alabama	United States	For Panama Canal Company.
Unknown date	Daybeam	Cargo ship	J. Blumer & Co. Ltd.	Sunderland	United Kingdom	For private owner.
Unknown date	Enugu	Cargo ship	W. Harkess & Sons Ltd.	Middlesbrough	United Kingdom	For Government of Nigeria.
Unknown date	Eveleen	Coaster	Ardrossan Shipyard	Ardrossan	United Kingdom	For J Mulligan & Co. Ltd.
Unknown date	Fogbreak	Fishing vessel	I. J. Abdela & Mitchell Ltd.	Queensferry	United Kingdom	For Royal Navy, but completed as a commercial fishing vessel.
Unknown date	Frauenfels	Cargo ship	Joh. C. Tecklenborg	Wesermünde	Germany	For Hansa Line.
Unknown date	Hunyar	Passenger ship	Ganz & Co	Rijeka	Austria-Hungary	For Jadranska Plovidba
Unknown date	Lop	Steam drifter	Berthon Boat Co. Ltd	Lymington	United Kingdom	For Admiralty, completed as a commercial fishing vessel.
Unknown date	Lysaght Gull	Barge	Abdela & Mitchell Ltd.	Brimscombe	United Kingdom	For John Lysaght Ltd.
Unknown date	Lysaght Petrel	Barge	Abdela & Mitchell Ltd.	Brimscombe	United Kingdom	For John Lysaght Ltd.
Unknown date	Maelstrom	Steam drifter	Berthon Boat Co. Ltd	Lymington	United Kingdom	For Admiralty, completed as a commercial fishing vessel.
Unknown date	Mamei	Coal barge	Alabama Drydock and Shipbuilding Company	Mobile, Alabama	United States	For Panama Canal Company.
Unknown date	Moonset	Naval drifter	J. W. Brooke & Co. Ltd.	Lowestoft	United Kingdom	For Royal Navy but completed as a commercial fishing drifter.
Unknown date	Narrangassett	Tanker	Vickers-Armstrongs Ltd.	Barrow-in-Furness	United Kingdom	For Anglo-American Oil Co. Ltd.
Unknown date	Ocean Swell	Drifter	J. W. Brooke & Co. Ltd.	Lowestoft	United Kingdom	For private owner.
Unknown date	Orlanda	Cargo ship	Krupp	Emden	Germany	For Rhederi AG von 1896
Unknown date	Outline	Drifter	J. W. Brooke & Co. Ltd.	Lowestoft	United Kingdom	For John W. Brooke, John W. M. Brooke and Adrian Lodge.
Unknown date	Puff	Drifter	J. W. Brooke & Co. Ltd.	Lowestoft	United Kingdom	For private owner.
Unknown date	Ramon de Larrinaga	Cargo ship	R. Duncan & Co.	Port Glasgow	United Kingdom	For Larrinaga Steamship Co. Ltd.
Unknown date	Rotarian	Design 1914 ship	Todd Dry Dock and Construction Company	Tacoma, Washington	United States	For United States Shipping Board
Unknown date	Salerno	Cargo ship	Earle's Shipbuilding Co. Ltd.	Hull	United Kingdom	For Ellerman's Wilson Line.
Unknown date	Sturmfels	Cargo ship	AG Weser	Bremen	Germany	For Hansa Line.
Unknown date	Sugillenco	Cargo ship			United States	For United States Shipping Board.
Unknown date	Sulanierco	Cargo ship	Submarine Boat Company.	Newark, New Jersey	United States	For United States Shipping Board.
Unknown date	S. W. Electra	Steamship	I. J. Abdela & Mitchell Ltd.	Queensferry	United Kingdom	For Isaac J. Abdela & Mitchell Ltd.
Unknown date	Tolosa	Design 1019 ship	Atlantic Corporation	Portsmouth, New Hampshire	United States	For United States Shipping Board
Unknown date	Urundi	Cargo ship	Blohm & Voss.	Hamburg	Germany	For Deutsche East Africa Line.
Unknown date	West Kedron	Design 1019 ship	Long Beach Shipbuilding	Long Beach, California	United States	For United States Shipping Board
Unknown date	Williwaw	Naval drifter	J. W. Brooke & Co. Ltd.	Lowestoft	United Kingdom	For Royal Navy, but completed as a commercial drifter.
Unknown date	Willem Van Driel Sr.	Cargo ship	Van Duivenijks Scheepswerft.	Lekkerkerk	Netherlands	For private owner.
Unknown date	Yngaren	Cargo ship	William Doxford & Sons Ltd.	Pallion	United Kingdom	For Rederi Transatlantic A/B.
Unknown date	Unnamed	Barge	I. J. Abdela & Mitchell Ltd.	Queensferry	United Kingdom	For private owner.
Unknown date	Unnamed	Barge	I. J. Abdela & Mitchell Ltd.	Queensferry	United Kingdom	For private owner.
Unknown date	Unnamed	Barge	I. J. Abdela & Mitchell Ltd.	Queensferry	United Kingdom	For private owner.
Unknown date	Unnamed	Barge	I. J. Abdela & Mitchell Ltd.	Queensferry	United Kingdom	For private owner.
Unknown date	Unnamed	Barge	I. J. Abdela & Mitchell Ltd.	Queensferry	United Kingdom	For private owner.
Unknown date	Unnamed	Sternwheeler	I. J. Abdela & Mitchell Ltd.	Queensferry	United Kingdom	For private owner.
