= Japanese submarine Ro-50 =

Kaichū-type submarine

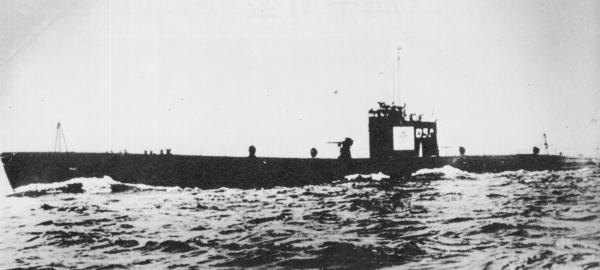
- Ro-50 on sea trials off Tamano, July 1944.

History

Japan
- Name: Submarine No. 391
- Builder: Mitsui Zosensho, Tamano, Japan
- Laid down: 18 February 1943
- Launched: 27 November 1943
- Renamed: Ro-50 on 27 November 1943
- Completed: 31 July 1944
- Commissioned: 31 July 1944
- Fate: Surrendered September 1945; Stricken 30 November 1945; Scuttled 1 April 1946

General characteristics
- Class & type: Kaichū type submarine (K6 subclass)
- Displacement: 1,133 tonnes (1,115 long tons) surfaced; 1,470 tonnes (1,447 long tons) submerged
- Length: 80.5 m (264 ft 1 in) overall
- Beam: 7 m (23 ft 0 in)
- Draft: 4.07 m (13 ft 4 in)
- Installed power: 4,200 bhp (3,100 kW) (diesel); 1,200 hp (890 kW) (electric motor)
- Propulsion: Diesel-electric; 1 × diesel engine; 1 × electric motor
- Speed: 19.75 knots (36.58 km/h; 22.73 mph) surfaced; 8 knots (15 km/h; 9.2 mph) submerged
- Range: 5,000 nmi (9,300 km; 5,800 mi) at 16 knots (30 km/h; 18 mph) surfaced; 45 nmi (83 km; 52 mi) at 5 knots (9.3 km/h; 5.8 mph) submerged
- Test depth: 80 m (260 ft)
- Crew: 61
- Armament: 4 × bow 533 mm (21 in) torpedo tubes; 1 × 76.2 mm (3.00 in) L/40 anti-aircraft gun; 2 × single 25 mm (1.0 in) AA guns

Ro-50 was an Imperial Japanese Navy Kaichū type submarine of the K6 sub-class. Completed and commissioned in July 1944, she served in World War II, conducting four war patrols, including operations off the Philippine Islands and the Ryukyu Islands. The only Kaichu-type submarine to survive the war, she surrendered in 1945 after its conclusion and was scuttled in 1946.

== Design and description ==
The submarines of the K6 sub-class were versions of the preceding K5 sub-class with greater range and diving depth. They displaced 1,133 tonnes (1,115 long tons) surfaced and 1,470 tonnes (1,447 long tons) submerged. The submarines were 80.5 meters (264 ft 1 in) long, had a beam of 7 meters (23 ft 0 in) and a draft of 4.07 meters (13 ft 4 in). They had a diving depth of 80 meters (260 ft).

For surface running, the boats were powered by two 2,100-brake-horsepower (1,566 kW) diesel engines, each driving one propeller shaft. When submerged each propeller was driven by a 600-horsepower (447 kW) electric motor. They could reach 19.75 knots (36.58 km/h; 22.73 mph) on the surface and 8 knots (15 km/h; 9.2 mph) underwater. On the surface, the K6s had a range of 11,000 nautical miles (20,000 km; 13,000 mi) at 12 knots (22 km/h; 14 mph); submerged, they had a range of 45 nmi (83 km; 52 mi) at 5 knots (9.3 km/h; 5.8 mph).

The boats were armed with four internal bow 53.3 cm (21.0 in) torpedo tubes and carried a total of ten torpedoes. They were also armed with a single 76.2 mm (3.00 in) L/40 anti-aircraft gun and two single 25 mm (1.0 in) AA guns.

== Construction and commissioning ==
Ro-50 was laid down at Submarine No. 391 on 18 February 1943 by Mitsui Zosensho at Tamano, Japan. She was launched on 31 July 1943 and was renamed Ro-50 that day. She was completed and commissioned on 31 July 1944.

== Service history ==
Upon commissioning, Ro-50 was attached to the Maizuru Naval District and assigned to Submarine Squadron 11 for workups. She was reassigned to Submarine Division 34 in the 6th Fleet on 5 November 1944.

=== First war patrol ===
On 19 November 1944, Ro-50 departed Kure, Japan, to begin her first war patrol, assigned a patrol area in the Philippine Sea east of Luzon in the Philippine Islands. While she was en route, an Imperial Japanese Navy Air Service floatplane mistakenly attacked her, dropping two depth charges, but she dived to 130 feet (40 m) and emerged unscathed from the encounter.

Ro-50 was in the Philippine Sea 150 nautical miles (280 km; 170 mi) northeast of Luzon's Lamon Bay on 25 November 1944 when she detected a plane on radar. Believing the plane to have come from a United States Navy aircraft carrier, Ro-50′s commanding officer moved to intercept the carrier. Five hours later, Ro-50 detected propeller noises, and soon thereafter she sighted three aircraft carriers with eight destroyers escorting them in a ring formation. After Ro-50 penetrated the escort screen, she sighted what her commanding officer described as a "Wasp-class" aircraft carrier dead ahead at a range of only 875 yards (800 m). After she fired four torpedoes at the carrier and dived to 263 feet (80 m), her crew heard a large explosion, and five minutes later her sound operator reported hearing the noises of a sinking ship breaking up that lasted for the next two minutes.

Ro-50′s commanding officer claimed to have sunk an escort aircraft carrier and a destroyer in the attack, but postwar analysis disproved his claim, and the explosion and other sounds Ro-50′s crew heard probably were due to premature or end-of-run detonations of her torpedoes. Her target may have been U.S. Navy Task Group 38.3, a component of Task Force 38, because the battleship USS Washington (BB-56), operating as a part of that task group, sighted two torpedoes passing ahead of her at the time of Ro-50′s attack, at least one of which appeared to be suffering from a steering problem. Ro-50 returned to Kure on 27 December 1944.

=== Second war patrol ===
With 6th Fleet commander-in-chief Vice Admiral Shigeyoshi Miwa on hand to see her off, Ro-50 set out from Kure on 23 January 1945 to begin her second war patrol, again in the Philippine Sea east of Luzon. She was off Leyte on 1 February 1945 when she sighted an Allied ship and pursued it, but she discontinued the chase when she identified it as a hospital ship. On 3 February 1945, she was in the Philippine Sea east of Luzon when an Allied warship — possibly the U.S. destroyer escort USS Tisdale (DE-33), which reported making a depth-charge attack against a sonar contact that day while on the return leg to Manus Island of a round-trip voyage as a convoy escort — pursued and attacked her. She escaped, but suffered damage.

On 4 February 1945, Ro-50 received orders from the 6th Fleet to stand by to evacuate Imperial Japanese Navy pilots stranded in the Batulinao area of northern Luzon. On 10 February 1945, however, she encountered an Allied convoy steaming in a single column at 08°01′N 136°37′E 300 nautical miles (560 km; 350 mi) east-southeast of Surigao on Leyte. She fired four torpedoes, one of which struck the tank landing ship USS LST-577, which was on a voyage from Hollandia, New Guinea, to Leyte, at about 08:10. The torpedo exploded, blowing off about a third of LST-577, including her bridge. Steaming a few thousand yards to port of LST-577, the destroyer USS Isherwood (DD-520) began a search for Ro-50 while another tank landing ship prepared to take LST-577 under tow and the rest of the convoy and its escorts departed the area.

Ro-50 surfaced after sundown on 10 February, and at 21:10 Isherwood detected her on radar at a range of 14,000 yards (12,800 m). Working up to 25 knots (46 km/h; 29 mph), Isherwood closed to 1,500 yards (1,400 m) and turned on her searchlights, but none could bear on Ro-50. Seeing the searchlights, Ro-50 crash-dived, descending to 395 feet (120 m). Isherwood then made sound contact on Ro-50 and dropped a full pattern of depth charges at a shallow setting. The explosion of the depth charges damaged Ro-50, rupturing her diving tank valve, shattering the lenses in both of her periscopes, and causing leaks in all of her torpedo tubes. Isherwood dropped two more full patterns of depth charges before losing contact, and her commanding officer and other members of her crew reported smelling oil.

Ro-50 survived the attacks and escaped. When she surfaced, her crew discovered a 40-pound (18.1 kg) fragment of a depth-charge on her afterdeck, and her commanding officer reported sinking an American cargo ship. Ro-50 had, in fact, inflicted fatal damage on LST-577, which Isherwood scuttled east of Mindanao at 08°05′N 126°17′E on 11 February 1945.

On 14 February 1945, Ro-50 transmitted a situation report to 6th Fleet headquarters and received permission to return to Kure, with orders to conduct a reconnaissance of the Ryukyu Islands en route. An Imperial Japanese Navy floatplane mistakenly attacked her south of Kyushu on 19 February 1945, dropping three depth charges, but she reached Kure on 20 February. She later moved to Maizuru.

=== Third war patrol ===
On 20 April 1945, Ro-50 got underway from Maizuru and transited the Bungo Strait to begin her third war patrol, assigned a patrol area in the Philippine Sea off Kitadaitōjima at the northern end of the Daitō Islands southeast of Okinawa. Off Kitadaitōjima on 28 April, she detected the propeller noises of an Allied task force, but was too far away to attempt an attack. She returned to Kure on 4 May 1945, and later moved back to Maizuru.

=== Fourth war patrol ===
Ro-50 departed Maizuru on 29 May 1945, heading for an area in the East China Sea east of Formosa for her fourth war patrol. After she arrived in her patrol area on 6 June 1945, she received orders to move to the waters of the Philippine Sea between Okinawa and Ulithi Atoll. Her patrol was uneventful, and she returned to Maizuru on 3 July 1945.

Ro-50 (left) and I-58 anchored in Sasebo shortly before disposal during Operation Road's End, 1 April 1946

=== End of war ===
Ro-50 was still in Japan when Emperor Hirohito announced the end of hostilities between Japan and the Allies on 15 August 1945. She was transferred from Submarine Division 34 to Submarine Division 15 that day. The only Kaichu-type submarine to survive World War II, she surrendered to the Allies in September 1945.

== Final disposition ==
The Japanese struck Ro-50 from the Navy list on 30 November 1945. After she was stripped of all useful equipment and material, the U.S. Navy scuttled her along with a number of other Japanese submarines off the Goto Islands on 1 April 1946 in Operation Road's End, sinking her due east of Goto Island, 16 nautical miles (30 km; 18 mi) off Kinai Island.
