= Shigeyoshi Miwa =

- 三輪 茂義
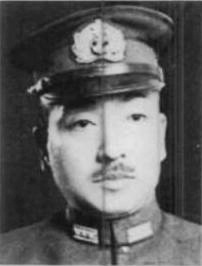
- Born: May 15, 1892; Aichi Prefecture, Japan
- Died: February 27, 1959 (aged 66)
- Military career
- Allegiance: Empire of Japan
- Branch: Imperial Japanese Navy
- Service years: 1911–1945
- Rank: Vice Admiral
- Commands: Submarine No. 22 (acting); Submarine No. 45; Ro-60; Kinu; 3rd Submarine Squadron; Naval Shipbuilding Command; 6th Fleet
- Conflicts: World War I; World War II; Attack on Pearl Harbor; Battle of Leyte Gulf

Shigeyoshi Miwa (三輪 茂義, Miwa Shigeyoshi; May 15, 1892 – February 27, 1959) was an admiral in the Imperial Japanese Navy during World War II. He commanded the Japanese submarine forces during the attack on Pearl Harbor.

== Biography ==
Miwa was a native of Aichi prefecture, and graduated 59th out of 148 cadets in the 39th class of the Imperial Japanese Navy Academy in 1911. He served his midshipman duty on the training ship Aso and battleship Mikasa, and as a sub-lieutenant on the protected cruiser Chikuma, coastal defense ship Iwami and armored cruiser Azuma. In 1917, he attended the Navy Staff College, where he specialized in navigation, torpedo warfare and submarines, transferring to the submarine warfare section as a lieutenant in 1918. He stayed on to become an instructor at the Submarine Warfare School from 1920 to 1922, and served as acting commanding officer of Submarine No, 22 (the future Ro-14) from May to December 1922. He was promoted to lieutenant commander in 1923.

In 1924, Miwa was given his first true command, that of Submarine No. 45 (the future Ro-26). He became commanding officer of the submarine Ro-60 in 1925. From 1925 to 1932, Miwa served in various staff positions on the Imperial Japanese Navy General Staff and as an instructor at the Naval Staff College on submarine warfare issues. He was promoted to captain in 1932, and assigned command of the 30th Submarine Group.

From 1935 to 1936, Miwa was captain of the light cruiser Kinu, and served as Chief of staff of the Mako Guard District from 1936 to 1938. He was promoted to rear admiral in November 1938. In 1939, he was assigned back to submarines as commander of the 3rd Submarine Squadron, and was in this position at the time of the attack on Pearl Harbor in December 1941. His submarines were part of the screening force around Pearl Harbor to prevent any United States Navy vessels from escaping during the air raids.

Miwa returned to the Naval General Staff in April 1942 and was promoted to vice admiral and placed in charge of the Naval Shipbuilding Command. In July 1944, he became commander-in-chief of the 6th Fleet, in charge of all submarine operations for the Imperial Japanese Navy, and served in this capacity during the Battle of Leyte Gulf in October 1944.

With his forces taking increasing casualties due to the increasing numbers of American warships and aircraft with increasingly effective anti-submarine warfare equipment, Miwa (although initially opposed) became a strong proponent of the Kaiten suicide submarine program. He was relieved of this command and returned to the Navy General Staff in May 1945.

Miwa went into retirement after the surrender of Japan in September 1945. He died in 1959 at age 66.
