= Japanese submarine Ro-35 =

- Ro-35 in 1943

History

Japan
- Name: Submarine No. 201
- Builder: Mitsubishi, Kobe, Japan
- Laid down: 9 October 1941
- Renamed: Ro-35
- Launched: 4 June 1942
- Completed: 25 March 1943
- Commissioned: 25 March 1943
- Fate: Missing after 25 August 1943; Probably sunk 25 August 1943
- Stricken: 1 December 1943

General characteristics
- Class & type: Kaichū type submarine (K7 subclass)
- Displacement: 1,133 tonnes (1,115 long tons) surfaced; 1,470 tonnes (1,447 long tons) submerged
- Length: 80.5 m (264 ft 1 in) overall
- Beam: 7 m (23 ft 0 in)
- Draft: 4.07 m (13 ft 4 in)
- Installed power: 4,200 bhp (3,100 kW) (diesel); 1,200 hp (890 kW) (electric motor)
- Propulsion: Diesel-electric; 2 × diesel engine (one per propeller shaft); 2 × electric motor (one per propeller shaft)
- Speed: 19.75 knots (36.58 km/h; 22.73 mph) surfaced; 8 knots (15 km/h; 9.2 mph) submerged
- Range: 11,000 nmi (20,000 km; 13,000 mi) at 12 knots (22 km/h; 14 mph) surfaced; 45 nmi (83 km; 52 mi) at 5 knots (9.3 km/h; 5.8 mph) submerged
- Test depth: 80 m (260 ft)
- Crew: 61
- Armament: 4 × bow 533 mm (21 in) torpedo tubes; 1 × 76.2 mm (3.00 in) L/40 anti-aircraft gun; 2 × single 25 mm (1.0 in) AA guns

Ro-35 was an Imperial Japanese Navy Kaichū type submarine, the lead unit of the K6 sub-class. Completed and commissioned in March 1943, she served in World War II and was sunk during her first war patrol in August 1943.

== Design and description ==
The submarines of the K6 sub-class were versions of the preceding K5 sub-class with greater range and diving depth. They displaced 1,133 tonnes (1,115 long tons) surfaced and 1,470 tonnes (1,447 long tons) submerged. The submarines were 80.5 meters (264 ft 1 in) long, had a beam of 7 meters (23 ft 0 in) and a draft of 4.07 meters (13 ft 4 in). They had a diving depth of 80 meters (260 ft).

For surface running, the boats were powered by two 2,100-brake-horsepower (1,566 kW) diesel engines, each driving one propeller shaft. When submerged each propeller was driven by a 600-horsepower (447 kW) electric motor. They could reach 19.75 knots (36.58 km/h; 22.73 mph) on the surface and 8 knots (15 km/h; 9.2 mph) underwater. On the surface, the K6s had a range of 11,000 nautical miles (20,000 km; 13,000 mi) at 12 knots (22 km/h; 14 mph); submerged, they had a range of 45 nmi (83 km; 52 mi) at 5 knots (9.3 km/h; 5.8 mph).

The boats were armed with four internal bow 53.3 cm (21.0 in) torpedo tubes and carried a total of ten torpedoes. They were also armed with a single 76.2 mm (3.00 in) L/40 anti-aircraft gun and two single 25 mm (1.0 in) AA guns.

== Construction and commissioning ==
Ro-35 was laid down on 9 October 1941 by Mitsubishi at Kobe, Japan, as the lead unit of the K6 subclass with the name Submarine No. 201. Renamed Ro-35, she was launched on 4 June 1942 and provisionally attached to the Maizuru Naval District that day. She was completed and commissioned on 25 March 1943.

== Service history ==
Upon commissioning, Ro-35 was attached formally to the Maizuru Naval District, and on 1 April 1943 she was assigned to Submarine Squadron 11 for workups.

On 17 July 1943, Ro-35 departed Kure, Japan, bound for Truk. During her voyage, she was reassigned to the 1st Submarine Unit in the 6th Fleet on 20 July 1943. She arrived at Truk in early August 1943.

Ro-35 got underway from Truk on 16 August 1943 to begin her first war patrol, ordered to conduct a reconnaissance of the Espiritu Santo area in the New Hebrides. At 17:00 on 25 August 1943, she transmitted a message in which she reported having sighted an Allied convoy of six transports. The Japanese never heard from her again.

At 19:12 on 25 August 1943, the United States Navy destroyer USS Patterson (DD-392) was escorting a convoy bound from the New Hebrides to the southeastern Solomon Islands when she made radar contact on a vessel east of the Solomons, 170 nautical miles (310 km; 200 mi) from Ndeni in the Santa Cruz Islands. As Patterson closed the range, the contact disappeared from radar at 4,000 yards (3,700 m), indicating that it was a diving submarine. Patterson acquired sonar contact on the submarine at a range of 3,800 yards (3,500 m) and soon began to attack it with depth charges. At 21:53, Patterson′s crew heard a deep underwater explosion, indicating the sinking of the submarine at 12°57′S 164°23′E.

Although the Japanese submarine I-25 was in the same area at the time, the submarine that Patterson sank was probably Ro-35. The headquarters of the 6th Fleet attempted to contact Ro-35 on 8 September 1943, but she did not reply. On 2 October 1943, the Imperial Japanese Navy declared Ro-35 to be presumed lost with all 66 hands off Espiritu Santo. She was stricken from the Navy list on 1 December 1943.

In June 1944, Fleet Radio Unit, Melbourne (FRUMEL), an Allied signals intelligence unit headquartered at Melbourne, Australia, reported that a Japanese submarine it identified as Ro-35 was making a supply voyage from Truk to Kusaie. However, FRUMEL probably confused Ro-35 with Ro-41.
