= Japanese submarine Ro-29 =

Imperial Japanese submarine

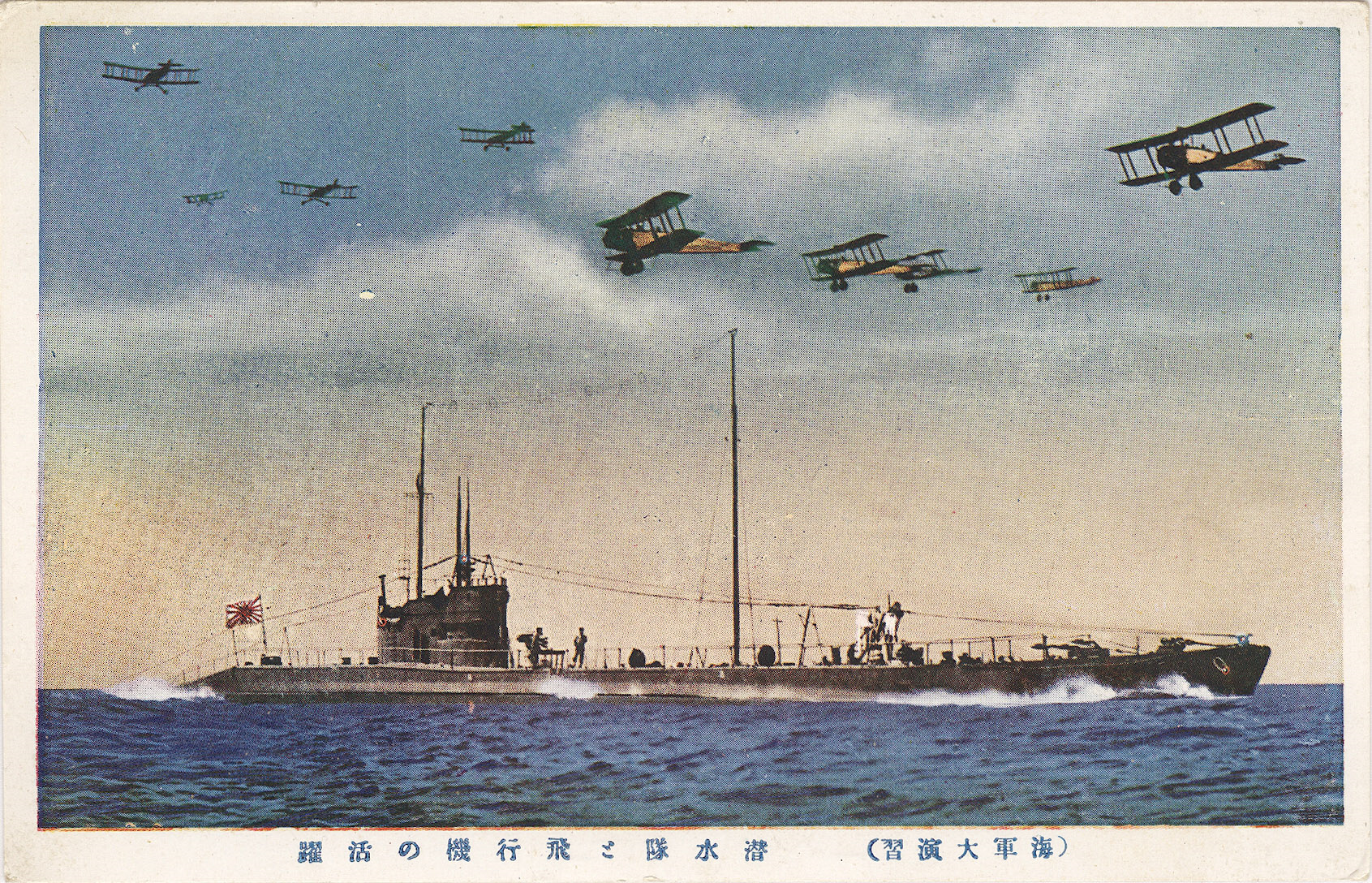
- Ro-29 submarine and Mitsubishi 2MR4 Aircraft c1930

History

Japan
- Name: Submarine No. 68
- Builder: Kawasaki, Kobe, Japan
- Laid down: 2 June 1921
- Launched: 5 December 1922
- Completed: 15 September 1923
- Commissioned: 15 September 1923
- Renamed: Ro-29 on 1 November 1924
- Decommissioned: 1 April 1936
- Stricken: 1 April 1936
- Fate: Hulked
- Renamed: Heisan No. 9 on 1 April 1940

General characteristics
- Class & type: Kaichū type submarine (K5 subclass)
- Displacement: 866 tonnes (852 long tons) surfaced; 1,047 tonnes (1,030 long tons) submerged
- Length: 74.22 m (243 ft 6 in) overall
- Beam: 6.12 m (20 ft 1 in)
- Draft: 3.73 m (12 ft 3 in)
- Installed power: 1,200 bhp (890 kW) (diesel); 1,200 hp (890 kW) (electric motor)
- Propulsion: Diesel-electric; 2 × Sulzer Mark I diesel engine, 143 tons fuel; 2 × electric motor
- Speed: 13 knots (24 km/h; 15 mph) surfaced; 8.5 knots (15.7 km/h; 9.8 mph) submerged
- Range: 9,000 nmi (17,000 km; 10,000 mi) at 10 knots (19 km/h; 12 mph) surfaced; 85 nmi (157 km; 98 mi) at 4 knots (7.4 km/h; 4.6 mph) submerged
- Test depth: 45.7 m (150 ft)
- Crew: 44
- Armament: 4 × bow 533 mm (21 in) torpedo tubes; 1 × 120 mm (4.7 in) gun; 1 × 6.5 mm machine gun

Ro-29, originally named Submarine No. 68, was an Imperial Japanese Navy Kaichu-Type submarine of the Kaichu V (Toku Chu) subclass. She was in commission from 1923 to 1936 and saw service in the waters of Formosa and Japan.

== Design and description ==
The submarines of the Kaichu V sub-class were designed for anti-shipping operations and carried more fuel and had greater range and a heavier gun armament than preceding Kaichu-type submarines. They displaced 866 tonnes (852 long tons) surfaced and 1,036 tonnes (1,020 long tons) submerged. The submarines were 74.22 meters (243 ft 6 in) long and had a beam of 6.12 meters (20 ft 1 in) and a draft of 3.73 meters (12 ft 3 in). They had a diving depth of 45.7 meters (150 ft).

For surface running, the submarines were powered by two 600-brake-horsepower (447 kW) Sulzer diesel engines, each driving one propeller shaft. When submerged each propeller was driven by a 600-horsepower (447 kW) electric motor. They could reach 13 knots (24 km/h; 15 mph) on the surface and 8.5 knots (15.7 km/h; 9.8 mph) underwater. On the surface, they had a range of 9,000 nautical miles (17,000 km; 10,000 mi) — although the Imperial Japanese Navy officially announced it as 6,000 nautical miles (11,000 km; 6,900 mi) — at 10 knots (19 km/h; 12 mph); submerged, they had a range of 85 nmi (157 km; 98 mi) at 4 knots (7.4 km/h; 4.6 mph).

The submarines were armed with four internal bow 533 mm (21.0 in) torpedo tubes and carried a total of eight torpedoes. They were also armed with a single 120 mm (4.7 in) deck gun and one 6.5 mm machine gun.

== Construction and commissioning ==
Ro-29 was laid down as Submarine No. 68 on 2 June 1921 by Kawasaki at Kobe, Japan. Launched on 5 December 1922, she was completed and commissioned on 15 September 1923.

== Service history ==
Upon commissioning, Submarine No. 68 was attached to the Sasebo Naval District, to which she remained attached throughout her active career. On 1 June 1924, she was assigned to both Submarine Division 25 — in which she spent her active career — and the Mako Defense Division headquartered at Mako in the Pescadores Islands. She was renamed Ro-29 on 1 November 1924. On 1 December 1926, she was reassigned to the Sasebo Defense Division, headquartered at Sasebo, Japan. Her service in the Sasebo Defense Division ended on 15 November 1934, after which she served as a unit of Submarine Division 25 in the Sasebo Naval District.

Ro-29 was decommissioned and stricken from the Navy list on 1 April 1936. As a hulk, she was renamed Heisan No. 9 on 1 April 1940.
