= Japanese submarine Ro-13 =

Kaichu-type submarine

History

Japan
- Name: Submarine No. 23
- Builder: Kure Naval Arsenal, Kure, Japan
- Laid down: 14 September 1918
- Launched: 26 August 1919
- Completed: 30 September 1920
- Commissioned: 30 September 1920
- Renamed: Ro-13 on 1 November 1924
- Stricken: 1 April 1932
- Renamed: Haisen No. 2 on 1 April 1932

General characteristics
- Class & type: Kaichū type submarine (K2 subclass)
- Displacement: 752 tonnes (740 long tons) surfaced; 1,019 tonnes (1,003.1 long tons) submerged
- Length: 70.10 m (230 ft 0 in) overall
- Beam: 6.10 m (20 ft 0 in)
- Draft: 3.68 m (12 ft 1 in)
- Installed power: 2,900 bhp (2,200 kW) (diesel); 1,200 hp (890 kW) (electric motor)
- Propulsion: Diesel-electric; 2 × Sulzer Mark II diesel engine, 75 tons fuel; 2 × electric motor; 2 x shafts
- Speed: 16.5 knots (30.6 km/h; 19.0 mph) surfaced; 8.5 knots (15.7 km/h; 9.8 mph) submerged
- Range: 6,000 nmi (11,000 km; 6,900 mi) at 10 knots (19 km/h; 12 mph) surfaced; 85 nmi (157 km; 98 mi) at 4 knots (7.4 km/h; 4.6 mph) submerged
- Test depth: 30 m (98 ft)
- Crew: 43
- Armament: 6 × 450 mm (18 in) torpedo tubes (4 x bow, 2 x external on upper deck); 10 x Type 44 torpedoes; 1 × 76.2 mm (3.00 in) gun

Ro-13, originally named Submarine No. 23, was an Imperial Japanese Navy Kaichū-Type submarine of the Kaichū II subclass. She was commissioned in 1920 and operated in the waters of Japan. She was stricken in 1932.

== Design and description ==
The submarines of the Kaichu II sub-class were larger and had a greater range than the preceding Kaichu I subclass, but they had the same powerplant, so their greater size resulted in a loss of some speed. They also had a modified conning tower, bow, and stern, and the stern was overhanging. They displaced 752 tonnes (740 long tons) surfaced and 1,019 tonnes (1,003.1 long tons) submerged. The submarines were 70.10 meters (230 ft 0 in) long and had a beam of 6.10 meters (20 ft 0 in) and a draft of 3.68 meters (12 ft 1 in). They had a diving depth of 30 meters (98 ft).

For surface running, the submarines were powered by two 1,450-brake-horsepower (1,081 kW) Sulzer Mark II diesel engines, each driving one propeller shaft. When submerged each propeller was driven by a 600-horsepower (447 kW) electric motor. They could reach 16.5 knots (31 km/h; 19 mph) on the surface and 8.5 knots (15.7 km/h; 9.8 mph) underwater. On the surface, they had a range of 6,000 nautical miles (11,000 km; 6,900 mi) at 10 knots (19 km/h; 12 mph); submerged, they had a range of 85 nmi (157 km; 98 mi) at 4 knots (7.4 km/h; 4.6 mph).

The submarines were armed with six 450 mm (18 in) torpedo tubes, four internal tubes in the bow and two external tubes mounted on the upper deck, and carried a total of ten Type 44 torpedoes. They were also armed with a single 76.2 mm (3.00 in) deck gun mounted aft of the conning tower.

== Construction and commissioning ==
Ro-13 was laid down as Submarine No. 23 on 14 September 1918 by the Kure Naval Arsenal at Kure, Japan. Launched on 26 August 1919, she was completed and commissioned on 30 September 1920.

== Service history ==
Upon commissioning, Submarine No. 23 was attached to the Kure Naval District and was assigned to the Kure Defense Division. On 1 December 1920 she was reassigned to Submarine Division 14 in Submarine Squadron 1 in the 1st Fleet. Submarine Division 14 was assigned to the Kure Defense Division and Kure Naval District on 1 July 1921, then to Submarine Squadron 2 in the 2nd Fleet on 1 December 1922.

On 1 December 1923, Submarine No. 23 was transferred to Submarine Division 3, assigned to duty in the Yokosuka Defense Division, and attached to the Yokosuka Naval District, and she remained in all three of those assignments for the remainder of her active career. She was renamed Ro-13 on 1 November 1924.

Ro-13 was stricken from the Navy list on 1 April 1932. She was renamed Haisen No. 2 that day.
