= Japanese submarine Ro-24 =

History

Japan
- Name: Submarine No. 42
- Builder: Sasebo Naval Arsenal, Sasebo, Japan
- Laid down: 21 April 1919
- Launched: 8 December 1919
- Completed: 30 November 1920
- Commissioned: 30 November 1920
- Renamed: Ro-24 on 1 November 1924
- Stricken: 1 April 1935
- Fate: Hulked 7 August 1935
- Renamed: Hulk No. 3107 on 7 August 1935

General characteristics
- Class & type: Kaichū type submarine (K3 subclass)
- Displacement: 752 tonnes (740 long tons) surfaced; 1,013 tonnes (997 long tons) submerged
- Length: 70.10 m (230 ft 0 in) overall
- Beam: 6.12 m (20 ft 1 in)
- Draft: 3.70 m (12 ft 2 in)
- Installed power: 2,900 bhp (2,200 kW) (diesel); 1,200 hp (890 kW) (electric motor)
- Propulsion: Diesel-electric; 2 × Sulzer Mark II diesel engine, 75 tons fuel; 2 × electric motor; 2 x shafts
- Speed: 16.5 knots (30.6 km/h; 19.0 mph) surfaced; 8.5 knots (15.7 km/h; 9.8 mph) submerged
- Range: 6,000 nmi (11,000 km; 6,900 mi) at 10 knots (19 km/h; 12 mph) surfaced; 85 nmi (157 km; 98 mi) at 4 knots (7.4 km/h; 4.6 mph) submerged
- Test depth: 45.7 m (150 ft)
- Crew: 46
- Armament: 6 × 450 mm (18 in) torpedo tubes (4 x bow, 2 x external on upper deck); 10 x Type 44 torpedoes; 1 × 76.2 mm (3.00 in) gun

Ro-24, originally named Submarine No. 42, was an Imperial Japanese Navy Kaichū-Type submarine, the lead unit of the Kaichū III subclass. She was commissioned in 1920 and operated in the waters of Japan, Formosa, and Chōsen before she was stricken in 1935.

== Design and description ==
The submarines of the Kaichu III sub-class were a slightly improved version of the preceding Kaichu II subclass, the man difference being an increase in diving depth from 30 to 45.7 meters (98 to 150 ft). They displaced 752 tonnes (740 long tons) surfaced and 1,013 tonnes (997 long tons) submerged. The submarines were 70.10 meters (230 ft 0 in) long and had a beam of 6.12 meters (20 ft 1 in) and a draft of 3.70 meters (12 ft 2 in).

For surface running, the submarines were powered by two 1,450-brake-horsepower (1,081 kW) Sulzer Mark II diesel engines, each driving one propeller shaft. When submerged each propeller was driven by a 600-horsepower (447 kW) electric motor. They could reach 16.5 knots (31 km/h; 19 mph) on the surface and 8.5 knots (15.7 km/h; 9.8 mph) underwater. On the surface, they had a range of 6,000 nautical miles (11,000 km; 6,900 mi) at 10 knots (19 km/h; 12 mph); submerged, they had a range of 85 nmi (157 km; 98 mi) at 4 knots (7.4 km/h; 4.6 mph).

The submarines were armed with six 450 mm (18 in) torpedo tubes, four internal tubes in the bow and two external tubes mounted on the upper deck, and carried a total of ten Type 44 torpedoes. They were also armed with a single 76.2 mm (3.00 in) deck gun mounted aft of the conning tower.

== Construction and commissioning ==
Ro-24 was laid down as Submarine No. 42 on 21 April 1919 by the Sasebo Naval Arsenal at Sasebo, Japan. Launched on 8 December 1919, she was completed and commissioned on 30 November 1920 as the first until of the Kaichu III subclass.

== Service history ==
Upon commissioning, Submarine No. 42 was attached to the Sasebo Naval District, to which she remained attached throughout her career. On 15 December 1921, she was assigned to Submarine Division 22 and to the Mako Defense Division at Mako in the Pescadores Islands. On 1 December 1922, Submarine Division 22 was reassigned to the Sasebo Defense Division, and on 1 November 1924, Submarine No. 42 was renamed Ro-24. On 1 December 1924, Submarine Division 22 was reassigned to the Chinkai Defense Division on the southern coast of Chōsen. Submarine Division 22 returned to the Sasebo Defense Division on 1 December 1925, serving in it until 15 November 1934, and thereafter operated directly under the control of the Sasebo Naval District.

Ro-24 was stricken from the Navy list on 1 April 1935. She was hulked on 7 August 1935 and renamed Hulk No. 3107.
