= Japanese submarine Ro-15 =

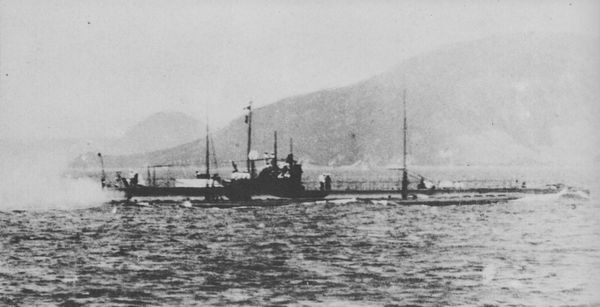
- Submarine No. 24 during the early 1920s, sometime before her name was changed to Ro-15 on 1 November 1924.

History

Japan
- Name: Submarine No. 24
- Builder: Kure Naval Arsenal, Kure, Japan
- Laid down: 12 June 1920
- Launched: 14 October 1920
- Completed: 30 June 1921
- Commissioned: 30 June 1921
- Renamed: Ro-15 on 1 November 1924
- Stricken: 1 September 1933
- Renamed: Training Hulk No. 3036 on 7 March 1934
- Fate: Hulked 7 March 1934; Scrapped September 1948

General characteristics
- Class & type: Kaichū type submarine (K2 subclass)
- Displacement: 752 tonnes (740 long tons) surfaced; 1,019 tonnes (1,003.1 long tons) submerged
- Length: 70.10 m (230 ft 0 in) overall
- Beam: 6.10 m (20 ft 0 in)
- Draft: 3.68 m (12 ft 1 in)
- Installed power: 2,900 bhp (2,200 kW) (diesel); 1,200 hp (890 kW) (electric motor)
- Propulsion: Diesel-electric; 2 × Sulzer Mark II diesel engine, 75 tons fuel; 2 × electric motor; 2 x shafts
- Speed: 16.5 knots (30.6 km/h; 19.0 mph) surfaced; 8.5 knots (15.7 km/h; 9.8 mph) submerged
- Range: 6,000 nmi (11,000 km; 6,900 mi) at 10 knots (19 km/h; 12 mph) surfaced; 85 nmi (157 km; 98 mi) at 4 knots (7.4 km/h; 4.6 mph) submerged
- Test depth: 30 m (98 ft)
- Crew: 43
- Armament: 6 × 450 mm (18 in) torpedo tubes (4 x bow, 2 x external on upper deck); 10 x Type 44 torpedoes; 1 × 76.2 mm (3.00 in) gun

:

Ro-15, originally named Submarine No. 24, was an Imperial Japanese Navy Kaichū-Type submarine of the Kaichū II subclass. She was commissioned in 1921 and operated in the waters of Japan. She was stricken in 1933.

== Design and description ==
The submarines of the Kaichu II sub-class were larger and had a greater range than the preceding Kaichu I subclass, but they had the same powerplant, so their greater size resulted in a loss of some speed. They also had a modified conning tower, bow, and stern, and the stern was overhanging. They displaced 752 tonnes (740 long tons) surfaced and 1,019 tonnes (1,003.1 long tons) submerged. The submarines were 70.10 meters (230 ft 0 in) long and had a beam of 6.10 meters (20 ft 0 in) and a draft of 3.68 meters (12 ft 1 in). They had a diving depth of 30 meters (98 ft).

For surface running, the submarines were powered by two 1,450-brake-horsepower (1,081 kW) Sulzer Mark II diesel engines, each driving one propeller shaft. When submerged each propeller was driven by a 600-horsepower (447 kW) electric motor. They could reach 16.5 knots (31 km/h; 19 mph) on the surface and 8.5 knots (15.7 km/h; 9.8 mph) underwater. On the surface, they had a range of 6,000 nautical miles (11,000 km; 6,900 mi) at 10 knots (19 km/h; 12 mph); submerged, they had a range of 85 nmi (157 km; 98 mi) at 4 knots (7.4 km/h; 4.6 mph).

The submarines were armed with six 450 mm (18 in) torpedo tubes, four internal tubes in the bow and two external tubes mounted on the upper deck, and carried a total of ten Type 44 torpedoes. They were also armed with a single 76.2 mm (3.00 in) deck gun mounted aft of the conning tower.

== Construction and commissioning ==
Ro-15 was laid down as Submarine No. 24 on 12 June 1920 by the Kure Naval Arsenal at Kure, Japan. Launched on 14 October 1920, she was completed and commissioned on 30 June 1921.

== Service history ==
Upon commissioning, Submarine No. 24 was attached to the Kure Naval District, to which she remained attached throughout her career. She was assigned to Submarine Division 15 — in which she spent the rest of her career — and to the Kure Defense Division on 1 July 1921. On 19 July 1921, a fire broke out in her galley due to faulty electrical wiring and spread to the adjacent torpedo room. She was flooded to extinguish it, but not before much of her interior was burned out. There were no casualties, and she was repaired and returned to service.

Submarine Division 15 served in the Kure Defense Division until 1 December 1921 and again from 1 December 1922 to 1 December 1923. While cruising off Moji, Japan, on 29 July 1924, Submarine No. 24 collided with a steamer, suffering no casualties.

Submarine No. 24 was renamed Ro-15 on 1 November 1924. On 1 December 1926, Submarine Division 15 began another assignment to the Kure Defense Division that lasted through the end of Ro-15′s active service.

Ro-15 was stricken from the Navy list on 1 September 1933. She remained moored at Kure as a hulk after that, and was renamed Training Hulk No. 3036 on 7 March 1934. She served on training duties through the end of World War II in August 1945, and was scrapped in September 1948.
