= Japanese submarine Ro-19 =

Imperial Japanese submarine commissioned in 1922

History

Japan
- Name: Submarine No. 36
- Builder: Kure Naval Arsenal, Kure, Japan
- Laid down: 9 September 1920
- Launched: 28 December 1920
- Completed: 15 March 1922
- Commissioned: 15 March 1922
- Renamed: Ro-19 on 1 November 1924
- Stricken: 1 April 1936
- Renamed: Haisen No. 5 on 1 April 1940
- Fate: Hulked; Scrapped 1948

General characteristics
- Class & type: Kaichū type submarine (K3 subclass)
- Displacement: 752 tonnes (740 long tons) surfaced; 1,013 tonnes (997 long tons) submerged
- Length: 70.10 m (230 ft 0 in) overall
- Beam: 6.12 m (20 ft 1 in)
- Draft: 3.70 m (12 ft 2 in)
- Installed power: 2,900 bhp (2,200 kW) (diesel); 1,200 hp (890 kW) (electric motor)
- Propulsion: Diesel-electric; 2 × Sulzer Mark II diesel engine, 75 tons fuel; 2 × electric motor; 2 x shafts
- Speed: 16.5 knots (30.6 km/h; 19.0 mph) surfaced; 8.5 knots (15.7 km/h; 9.8 mph) submerged
- Range: 6,000 nmi (11,000 km; 6,900 mi) at 10 knots (19 km/h; 12 mph) surfaced; 85 nmi (157 km; 98 mi) at 4 knots (7.4 km/h; 4.6 mph) submerged
- Test depth: 45.7 m (150 ft)
- Crew: 46
- Armament: 6 × 450 mm (18 in) torpedo tubes (4 x bow, 2 x external on upper deck); 10 x Type 44 torpedoes; 1 × 76.2 mm (3.00 in) gun

Ro-19, originally named Submarine No. 36, was an Imperial Japanese Navy Kaichū-Type submarine of the Kaichū III subclass. She was commissioned in 1922 and operated in the waters of Japan. She was stricken in 1936.

== Design and description ==
The submarines of the Kaichu III sub-class were a slightly improved version of the preceding Kaichu II subclass, the man difference being an increase in diving depth from 30 to 45.7 meters (98 to 150 ft). They displaced 752 tonnes (740 long tons) surfaced and 1,013 tonnes (997 long tons) submerged. The submarines were 70.10 meters (230 ft 0 in) long and had a beam of 6.12 meters (20 ft 1 in) and a draft of 3.70 meters (12 ft 2 in).

For surface running, the submarines were powered by two 1,450-brake-horsepower (1,081 kW) Sulzer Mark II diesel engines, each driving one propeller shaft. When submerged each propeller was driven by a 600-horsepower (447 kW) electric motor. They could reach 16.5 knots (31 km/h; 19 mph) on the surface and 8.5 knots (15.7 km/h; 9.8 mph) underwater. On the surface, they had a range of 6,000 nautical miles (11,000 km; 6,900 mi) at 10 knots (19 km/h; 12 mph); submerged, they had a range of 85 nmi (157 km; 98 mi) at 4 knots (7.4 km/h; 4.6 mph).

The submarines were armed with six 450 mm (18 in) torpedo tubes, four internal tubes in the bow and two external tubes mounted on the upper deck, and carried a total of ten Type 44 torpedoes. They were also armed with a single 76.2 mm (3.00 in) deck gun mounted aft of the conning tower.

== Construction and commissioning ==
Ro-19 was laid down as Submarine No. 36 on 9 September 1920 by the Kure Naval Arsenal at Kure, Japan. Launched on 28 December 1920, she was completed and commissioned on 15 March 1922.

== Service history ==
Upon commissioning, Submarine No. 36 was assigned to Submarine Division 16 in Submarine Squadron 1 in the 1st Fleet. Submarine Division 16 was reassigned to Submarine Squadron 2 in the 2nd Fleet on 1 December 1922, and then to the Kure Naval District — in which it remained for the rest of the submarine's active career — on 1 December 1923. In the years that followed, Submarine No. 36 was renamed Ro-19 on 1 November 1924, and Submarine Division 16 served in the Kure Defense Division from 10 December 1928 to 15 November 1934.

Ro-19 was stricken from the Navy list on 1 April 1936. She was hulked, and on 1 April 1940 was renamed Haisen No. 5. She was scrapped in 1948.
