= Japanese submarine Ro-25 =

History

Japan
- Name: Submarine No. 43
- Builder: Sasebo Naval Arsenal, Sasebo, Japan
- Laid down: 19 February 1920
- Launched: 17 July 1920
- Completed: 25 October 1921
- Commissioned: 25 October 1921
- Renamed: Ro-25 on 1 November 1924
- Decommissioned: 26 April 1924
- Recommissioned: 4 May 1925
- Stricken: 1 April 1936
- Fate: Scrapped 1936

General characteristics
- Class & type: Kaichū type submarine (K3 subclass)
- Displacement: 752 tonnes (740 long tons) surfaced; 1,013 tonnes (997 long tons) submerged
- Length: 70.10 m (230 ft 0 in) overall
- Beam: 6.12 m (20 ft 1 in)
- Draft: 3.70 m (12 ft 2 in)
- Installed power: 2,900 bhp (2,200 kW) (diesel); 1,200 hp (890 kW) (electric motor)
- Propulsion: Diesel-electric; 2 × Sulzer Mark II diesel engine, 75 tons fuel; 2 × electric motor; 2 x shafts
- Speed: 16.5 knots (30.6 km/h; 19.0 mph) surfaced; 8.5 knots (15.7 km/h; 9.8 mph) submerged
- Range: 6,000 nmi (11,000 km; 6,900 mi) at 10 knots (19 km/h; 12 mph) surfaced; 85 nmi (157 km; 98 mi) at 4 knots (7.4 km/h; 4.6 mph) submerged
- Test depth: 45.7 m (150 ft)
- Crew: 46
- Armament: 6 × 450 mm (18 in) torpedo tubes (4 x bow, 2 x external on upper deck); 10 x Type 44 torpedoes; 1 × 76.2 mm (3.00 in) gun

Ro-25, originally named Submarine No. 43, was an Imperial Japanese Navy Kaichū-Type submarine of the Kaichū III subclass. She was commissioned in 1921 and operated in the waters of Japan and Formosa. She sank after a collision in 1924, and after salvage and repairs returned to service from 1925 to 1936.

== Design and description ==
The submarines of the Kaichu III sub-class were a slightly improved version of the preceding Kaichu II subclass, the man difference being an increase in diving depth from 30 to 45.7 meters (98 to 150 ft). They displaced 752 tonnes (740 long tons) surfaced and 1,013 tonnes (997 long tons) submerged. The submarines were 70.10 meters (230 ft 0 in) long and had a beam of 6.12 meters (20 ft 1 in) and a draft of 3.70 meters (12 ft 2 in).

For surface running, the submarines were powered by two 1,450-brake-horsepower (1,081 kW) Sulzer Mark II diesel engines, each driving one propeller shaft. When submerged each propeller was driven by a 600-horsepower (447 kW) electric motor. They could reach 16.5 knots (31 km/h; 19 mph) on the surface and 8.5 knots (15.7 km/h; 9.8 mph) underwater. On the surface, they had a range of 6,000 nautical miles (11,000 km; 6,900 mi) at 10 knots (19 km/h; 12 mph); submerged, they had a range of 85 nmi (157 km; 98 mi) at 4 knots (7.4 km/h; 4.6 mph).

The submarines were armed with six 450 mm (18 in) torpedo tubes, four internal tubes in the bow and two external tubes mounted on the upper deck, and carried a total of ten Type 44 torpedoes. They were also armed with a single 76.2 mm (3.00 in) deck gun mounted aft of the conning tower.

== Construction and commissioning ==
Ro-25 was laid down as Submarine No. 43 on 19 February 1920 by the Sasebo Naval Arsenal at Sasebo, Japan. Launched on 17 July 1920, she was completed and commissioned on 25 October 1921.

== Service history ==
Upon commissioning, Submarine No. 43 was attached to the Sasebo Naval District, to which she remained attached throughout her career. On 15 December 1921, she was assigned to Submarine Division 22 and to the Mako Defense Division at Mako in the Pescadores Islands. On 1 December 1922, Submarine Division 22 was reassigned to the Sasebo Defense Division.

On 19 March 1924, Submarine No. 43 was taking part in maneuvers off the harbor at Sasebo when she collided with the light cruiser Tatsuta. Tatsuta sliced through Submarine No. 43′s conning tower, and Submarine No. 43 sank 3 nautical miles (5.6 km; 3.5 mi) off Sasebo in 156 feet (48 m) of water. Using a telephone floated from the sunken submarine, a rescue party on the surface established contact with the crewmen trapped aboard her, who reported ever-deteriorating conditions before falling silent about ten hours after she sank. Submarine No. 43′s entire crew of 46 suffocated.

Submarine No. 43 was partially raised and towed to Sasebo, where she arrived on 13 April 1924 so that salvage operations could be completed in the protected waters of the harbor. She was fully refloated on 25 April 1924 and on 26 April was decommissioned and placed in reserve in the Sasebo Naval District to undergo repairs. While under repair, she was renamed Ro-25 on 1 November 1924. Her repairs were completed on 4 May 1925, and on 1 March 1926 she was recommissioned and returned to service in both Submarine Division 22 and the Sasebo Defense Division. On 1 December 1927 she was reassigned directly to the Sasebo Naval District and subsequently was used for trials.

Ro-25 was stricken from the Navy list on 1 April 1936. She subsequently was scrapped during 1936.

== Commemoration ==
The Submarine No. 43 Memorial, a gray obelisk commemorating the 1924 sinking of Submarine No. 43, stands on Udogoe, overlooking Sasebo. It provides a vantage point from which visitors can see the area in which she sank.
