= Japanese submarine Ro-21 =

History

Japan
- Name: Submarine No. 39
- Builder: Yokosuka Naval Arsenal, Yokosuka, Japan
- Laid down: 28 July 1919
- Launched: 26 October 1920
- Completed: 1 February 1922
- Commissioned: 1 February 1922
- Renamed: Ro-21 on 1 November 1924
- Stricken: 1 April 1934
- Fate: Sold 6 July 1935; Scuttled as artificial reef ca. 1935

General characteristics
- Class & type: Kaichū type submarine (K3 subclass)
- Displacement: 752 tonnes (740 long tons) surfaced; 1,013 tonnes (997 long tons) submerged
- Length: 70.10 m (230 ft 0 in) overall
- Beam: 6.12 m (20 ft 1 in)
- Draft: 3.70 m (12 ft 2 in)
- Installed power: 2,900 bhp (2,200 kW) (diesel); 1,200 hp (890 kW) (electric motor)
- Propulsion: Diesel-electric; 2 × Sulzer Mark II diesel engine, 75 tons fuel; 2 × electric motor; 2 x shafts
- Speed: 16.5 knots (30.6 km/h; 19.0 mph) surfaced; 8.5 knots (15.7 km/h; 9.8 mph) submerged
- Range: 6,000 nmi (11,000 km; 6,900 mi) at 10 knots (19 km/h; 12 mph) surfaced; 85 nmi (157 km; 98 mi) at 4 knots (7.4 km/h; 4.6 mph) submerged
- Test depth: 45.7 m (150 ft)
- Crew: 46
- Armament: 6 × 450 mm (18 in) torpedo tubes (4 x bow, 2 x external on upper deck); 10 x Type 44 torpedoes; 1 × 76.2 mm (3.00 in) gun

Ro-21, originally named Submarine No. 39, was an Imperial Japanese Navy Kaichū-Type submarine of the Kaichū III subclass. She was commissioned in 1922 and operated in the waters of Japan. She was stricken in 1934.

== Design and description ==
The submarines of the Kaichu III sub-class were a slightly improved version of the preceding Kaichu II subclass, the man difference being an increase in diving depth from 30 to 45.7 meters (98 to 150 ft). They displaced 752 tonnes (740 long tons) surfaced and 1,013 tonnes (997 long tons) submerged. The submarines were 70.10 meters (230 ft 0 in) long and had a beam of 6.12 meters (20 ft 1 in) and a draft of 3.70 meters (12 ft 2 in).

For surface running, the submarines were powered by two 1,450-brake-horsepower (1,081 kW) Sulzer Mark II diesel engines, each driving one propeller shaft. When submerged each propeller was driven by a 600-horsepower (447 kW) electric motor. They could reach 16.5 knots (31 km/h; 19 mph) on the surface and 8.5 knots (15.7 km/h; 9.8 mph) underwater. On the surface, they had a range of 6,000 nautical miles (11,000 km; 6,900 mi) at 10 knots (19 km/h; 12 mph); submerged, they had a range of 85 nmi (157 km; 98 mi) at 4 knots (7.4 km/h; 4.6 mph).

The submarines were armed with six 450 mm (18 in) torpedo tubes, four internal tubes in the bow and two external tubes mounted on the upper deck, and carried a total of ten Type 44 torpedoes. They were also armed with a single 76.2 mm (3.00 in) deck gun mounted aft of the conning tower.

== Construction and commissioning ==
Ro-21 was laid down as Submarine No. 39 on 28 July 1919 by the Yokosuka Naval Arsenal at Yokosuka, Japan. Launched on 26 October 1920, she was completed and commissioned on 1 February 1922.

== Service history ==
Upon commissioning, Submarine No. 39 was attached to the Yokosuka Naval District, to which she remained attached throughout her career. On 6 February 1922, she was assigned to Submarine Division 5 and to the Ominato Defense Division, and on 1 November 1924 she was renamed Ro-21. On 1 November 1925, Submarine Division 5 was reassigned to the Yokosuka Defense Division, then directly to the Yokosuka Naval District on 1 December 1926, and then to the Yokosuka Defense Division again on 10 January 1927.

Ro-21 was stricken from the Navy list on 1 April 1934. Her engines were removed at Uraga Shipyard, and on 6 July 1935 she was sold to the Fisheries Association of Miura District in Kanagawa Prefecture for use as an artificial reef. She subsequently was scuttled to serve as a breeding ground for fish and fishing reef.
