= Japanese submarine Ro-16 =

Kaichu-type submarine

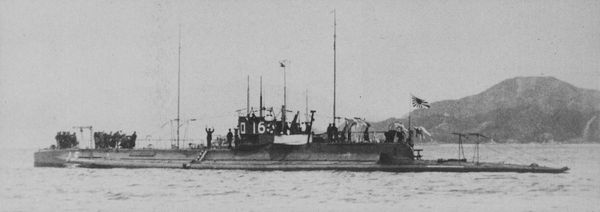
- Ro-16 during the 1920s, sometime after her name was changed from Submarine No. 37 to Ro-16 on 1 November 1924.

History

Japan
- Name: Submarine No. 37
- Builder: Kure Naval Arsenal, Kure, Japan
- Laid down: 18 November 1920
- Launched: 22 April 1921
- Completed: 29 April 1922
- Commissioned: 29 April 1922
- Renamed: Ro-16 on 1 November 1924
- Stricken: 1 September 1933
- Fate: Hulked 1934

General characteristics
- Class & type: Kaichū type submarine (K3 subclass)
- Displacement: 752 tonnes (740 long tons) surfaced; 1,013 tonnes (997 long tons) submerged
- Length: 70.10 m (230 ft 0 in) overall
- Beam: 6.12 m (20 ft 1 in)
- Draft: 3.70 m (12 ft 2 in)
- Installed power: 2,900 bhp (2,200 kW) (diesel); 1,200 hp (890 kW) (electric motor)
- Propulsion: Diesel-electric; 2 × Sulzer Mark II diesel engine, 75 tons fuel; 2 × electric motor; 2 x shafts
- Speed: 16.5 knots (30.6 km/h; 19.0 mph) surfaced; 8.5 knots (15.7 km/h; 9.8 mph) submerged
- Range: 6,000 nmi (11,000 km; 6,900 mi) at 10 knots (19 km/h; 12 mph) surfaced; 85 nmi (157 km; 98 mi) at 4 knots (7.4 km/h; 4.6 mph) submerged
- Test depth: 45.7 m (150 ft)
- Crew: 46
- Armament: 6 × 450 mm (18 in) torpedo tubes (4 x bow, 2 x external on upper deck); 10 x Type 44 torpedoes; 1 × 76.2 mm (3.00 in) gun

Ro-16, originally named Submarine No. 37, was an Imperial Japanese Navy Kaichū-Type submarine of the Kaichū III subclass. She was commissioned in 1922 and operated in the waters of Japan. She was stricken in 1933.

== Design and description ==
The submarines of the Kaichu III sub-class were a slightly improved version of the preceding Kaichu II subclass, the man difference being an increase in diving depth from 30 to 45.7 meters (98 to 150 ft). They displaced 752 tonnes (740 long tons) surfaced and 1,013 tonnes (997 long tons) submerged. The submarines were 70.10 meters (230 ft 0 in) long and had a beam of 6.12 meters (20 ft 1 in) and a draft of 3.70 meters (12 ft 2 in).

For surface running, the submarines were powered by two 1,450-brake-horsepower (1,081 kW) Sulzer Mark II diesel engines, each driving one propeller shaft. When submerged, each propeller was driven by a 600-horsepower (447 kW) electric motor. They could reach 16.5 knots (31 km/h; 19 mph) on the surface and 8.5 knots (15.7 km/h; 9.8 mph) underwater. On the surface, they had a range of 6,000 nautical miles (11,000 km; 6,900 mi) at 10 knots (19 km/h; 12 mph); submerged, they had a range of 85 nmi (157 km; 98 mi) at 4 knots (7.4 km/h; 4.6 mph).

The submarines were armed with six 450 mm (18 in) torpedo tubes, four internal tubes in the bow and two external tubes mounted on the upper deck, and carried a total of ten Type 44 torpedoes. They were also armed with a single 76.2 mm (3.00 in) deck gun mounted aft of the conning tower.

== Construction and commissioning ==
Ro-16 was laid down as Submarine No. 37 on 18 November 1920 by the Kure Naval Arsenal at Kure, Japan. Launched on 22 April 1921, she was completed and commissioned on 29 April 1922.

== Service history ==
Upon commissioning, Submarine No. 37 was attached to the Kure Naval District, to which she remained attached throughout her career. She was assigned to Submarine Division 15 — in which she spent the rest of her career — on 15 May 1922. Submarine Division 15 served in the Kure Defense Division from 1 December 1922 to 1 December 1923. Submarine No. 37 was renamed Ro-16 on 1 November 1924, and on 1 December 1926 Submarine Division 15 began another assignment to the Kure Defense Division that lasted through the end of Ro-16′s active service.

Ro-16 was stricken from the Navy list on 1 September 1933. In 1934, her hulk was transferred to the Ehime Prefectural Yuge Commercial Ship School, later renamed the Yuge National College of Maritime Technology, at Yuge, Ehime, Japan.
