= Type L submarine =

Type L submarine may refer to one of the following classes of submarines based on the British L-class submarine:

- Japanese Type L submarine, a class of submarine for the Imperial Japanese Navy; built in the mid-1920s and active in World War II
- Soviet Type L submarine, an alternate name for the Soviet Navy's Leninets-class submarine; built between 1931–1941 and active during World War II; most decommissioned by the 1950s

== Bibliography ==
- Jentschura, Hansgeorg; Jung, Dieter & Mickel, Peter (1977). Warships of the Imperial Japanese Navy, 1869–1945. Annapolis, Maryland: United States Naval Institute. ISBN 978-0-87021-893-4.
- Budzbon, Przemysław; Radziemski, Jan & Twardowski, Marek (2022). Warships of the Soviet Fleets 1939–1945. Vol. I: Major Combatants. Annapolis, Maryland: Naval Institute Press. ISBN 978-1-68247-877-6.

== See also ==
- Type I submarine
