= Japanese submarine Ro-26 =

Kaichu-type submarine

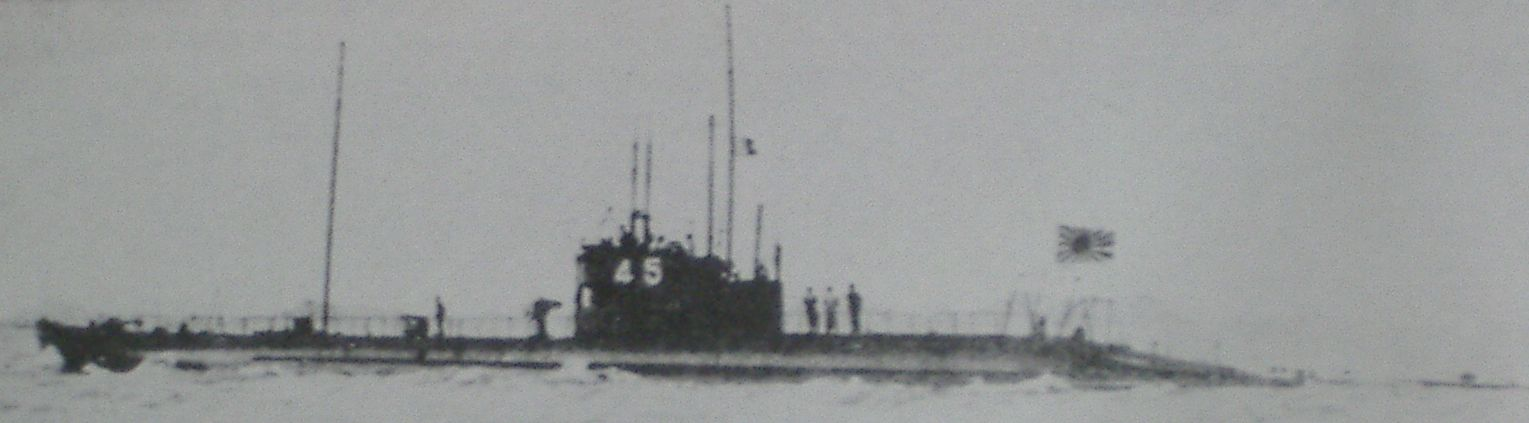
- Submarine No. 45 on 9 June 1923. She was renamed Ro-26 on 1 November 1924.

History

Japan
- Name: Submarine No. 45
- Builder: Sasebo Naval Arsenal, Sasebo, Japan
- Laid down: 10 March 1921
- Launched: 18 October 1921
- Completed: 25 January 1923
- Commissioned: 25 January 1923
- Renamed: Ro-26 on 1 November 1924
- Decommissioned: 15 December 1938
- Recommissioned: 1 May 1939
- Decommissioned: 1 April 1940
- Stricken: 1 April 1940
- Renamed: Heisan No. 6 on 1 April 1940
- Fate: Hulked 1 April 1940; Scrapped 1947–1948

General characteristics
- Class & type: Kaichū type submarine (K4 subclass)
- Displacement: 762 tonnes (750 long tons) surfaced; 1,097 tonnes (1,080 long tons) submerged
- Length: 74.22 m (243 ft 6 in) overall
- Beam: 6.12 m (20 ft 1 in)
- Draft: 3.73 m (12 ft 3 in)
- Installed power: 2,900 bhp (2,200 kW) (diesel); 1,200 hp (890 kW) (electric motor)
- Propulsion: Diesel-electric; 2 × Sulzer Mark II diesel engine, 75 tons fuel; 2 × electric motor; 2 x shafts
- Speed: 16 knots (30 km/h; 18 mph) surfaced; 8.5 knots (15.7 km/h; 9.8 mph) submerged
- Range: 6,000 nmi (11,000 km; 6,900 mi) at 10 knots (19 km/h; 12 mph) surfaced; 85 nmi (157 km; 98 mi) at 4 knots (7.4 km/h; 4.6 mph) submerged
- Test depth: 45.7 m (150 ft)
- Crew: 46
- Armament: 4 × bow 533 mm (21 in) torpedo tubes; 8 x 6th Year Type torpedoes; 1 × 76.2 mm (3.00 in) gun

Ro-26, originally named Submarine No. 45, was an Imperial Japanese Navy Kaichū-Type submarine, the lead unit of the Kaichū IV subclass. She was in commission from 1923 to 1938 and from 1939 to 1940.

== Design and description ==
The submarines of the Kaichu IV sub-class were an improved version of the preceding Kaichu III subclass, slightly larger, with heavier torpedoes, and with the deck gun mounted forward of the conning tower instead of aft of it. They displaced 762 tonnes (750 long tons) surfaced and 1,097 tonnes (1,080 long tons) submerged. The submarines were 74.22 meters (243 ft 6 in) long and had a beam of 6.12 meters (20 ft 1 in) and a draft of 3.73 meters (12 ft 3 in). They had a diving depth of 45.7 meters (150 ft).

For surface running, the submarines were powered by two 1,450-brake-horsepower (1,081 kW) Sulzer Mark II diesel engines, each driving one propeller shaft. When submerged each propeller was driven by a 600-horsepower (447 kW) electric motor. They could reach 16 knots (30 km/h; 18 mph) on the surface and 8.5 knots (15.7 km/h; 9.8 mph) underwater. On the surface, they had a range of 6,000 nautical miles (11,000 km; 6,900 mi) at 10 knots (19 km/h; 12 mph); submerged, they had a range of 85 nmi (157 km; 98 mi) at 4 knots (7.4 km/h; 4.6 mph).

The submarines were armed with four internal bow 533 mm (21.0 in) torpedo tubes and carried a total of eight torpedoes. They were also armed with a single 76.2 mm (3.00 in) deck gun.

== Construction and commissioning ==
Ro-26 was laid down as Submarine No. 45 on 10 March 1921 by the Sasebo Naval Arsenal at Sasebo, Japan. Launched on 18 October 1921, she was completed and commissioned on 25 January 1923, the lead unit of the Kaichū IV subclass.

== Service history ==
Upon commissioning, Submarine No. 45 was attached to the Kure Naval District, and on 15 December 1923, she was assigned to Submarine Division 14 and to the Kure Defense Division. On 1 April 1924, Submarine Division 14 was reassigned to Submarine Squadron 2 in the 2nd Fleet.

On 16 May 1924 Submarine No. 45′s diving rudders failed while she was conducting a practice attack. Her crew lost control of her, and she sank to the bottom in a vertical position in 170 feet (52 m) of water. Her crew managed to bring her to the surface, and she suffered no casualties.

On 1 November 1924, Submarine No. 45 was renamed Ro-26. Submarine Division 14 was reassigned to the Kure Naval District on 1 August 1925, and on 18 August 1925 began duty with the Kure Defense Division. This lasted until 1 December 1925, when the division returned to Submarine Squadron 2 in the 2nd Fleet.

On 1 December 1926, Submarine Division 14 was reassigned to the Kure Naval District, in which it remained until 1933. In the years that followed, the division had duty in the Kure Defense Division from 10 December 1928 to 1 December 1930, and Ro-26 underwent a refit in 1932. Ro-26 again served in the Kure Defense Division from 1 October 1932 to 1 February 1933. and was assigned directly to the Kure Naval District from 15 November 1933 to 15 November 1935, then returned to Submarine Division 14. She was decommissioned on 1 December 1938 and placed in Fourth Reserve in the Kure Naval District, then recommissioned on 1 May 1939 and assigned directly to the district.

Ro-26 was decommissioned and stricken from the Navy list on 1 April 1940. She served subsequently as the training hulk Heisan No. 6 at the submarine school at Kure, Japan. She was sold for scrap after World War II; scrapping began at Kanagawa, Japan, in 1947 and was completed in April 1948.
