= Kaichū type submarine =

Class of WW2-era Japanese submarines

Class overview
- Name: Kaichū type submarines
- Builders: Kure Naval Arsenal; Sasebo Naval Arsenal; Yokosuka Naval Arsenal; Kawasaki Shipbuilding; Mitsui Engineering & Shipbuilding; Mitsubishi Heavy Industries
- Operators: Imperial Japanese Navy
- Subclasses: Kaichū I (Ro-11 class); Kaichū II (Ro-13 class); Kaichū III (Ro-16 class); Kaichū IV (Ro-26 class); Toku-Chū/Kaichū V (Ro-29 class); Kaichū VI (Ro-33 class); Sen-Chū/Kaichū VII (Ro-35 class)
- Built: 1917-1944
- In commission: 1919-1945

The Kaichū type submarine (海中型潜水艦, Kaichū-gata sensuikan) submarines were double-hulled medium-sized submarines of the Imperial Japanese Navy during World War II. The name was derived from the Kaigun-shiki Chū-gata Sensuikan (海軍式中型潜水艦, Navy Medium Type submarine).

Several variants existed. From 1934 to 1944, the K6 type (Ro-33 Class) and the K7 type (Senchū, Ro-35 Class) were built. They were equipped with a 76.2 mm (3.00 in) L/40 gun and four 53 cm torpedo tubes for ten type 95 Long Lance torpedoes.

Most of these submarines were destroyed in combat, suffering from Allied anti-submarine warfare measures, and only Ro-50 survived the war.

== Class variants ==
The Kaichū type submarines were divided into seven classes:

- Kaichū I (海中1型（呂一一型）, Kaichū-ichi-gata, Ro-11-class)
- Kaichū II (海中2型（呂一三型）, Kaichū-ni-gata, Ro-13-class)
- Kaichū III (海中3型（呂一六型）, Kaichū-san-gata, Ro-16-class)
- Kaichū IV (海中4型（呂二六型）, Kaichū-yon-gata, Ro-26-class)
- Toku-Chū/Kaichū V (特中型/海中5型（呂二九型）, Toku-Chū-gata/Kaichū-go-gata, Ro-29-class)
- Kaichū VI (海中6型（呂三三型）, Kaichū-roku-gata, Ro-33-class)
- Sen-Chū/Kaichū VII (潜中型/海中7型（呂三五型）, Sen-Chū-gata/Kaichū-nana-gata, Ro-35-class)

=== Kaichū I (Ro-11 class) ===
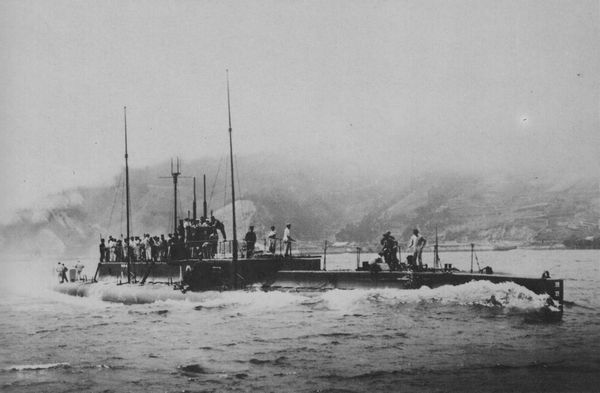
Ro-11 in 1919

Project number S7. In 1910s, the Imperial Japanese Navy (IJN) bought a license of Schneider-Laubeuf design submarine. The IJN used the design as model and built the S Type (Schneider Type) submarine, the Ha-9 and Ha-10. The Kaichū I is the submarine which jumboized the S Type submarines.

- Boats in class

Boat	Builder	Laid down	Launched	Completed	Fate
Submarine No. 19; Ro-11	Kure Naval Arsenal	25-04-1917	25-10-1917	31-07-1919 as Submarine No. 19	Renamed Ro-11 01-11-1924. Decommissioned 01-04-1932.
Submarine No. 20; Ro-12	Kure Naval Arsenal	25-04-1917	01-12-1917	18-09-1919 as Submarine No. 20	Renamed Ro-12 01-11-1924. Decommissioned 01-04-1932.

=== Kaichū II (Ro-13 class) ===
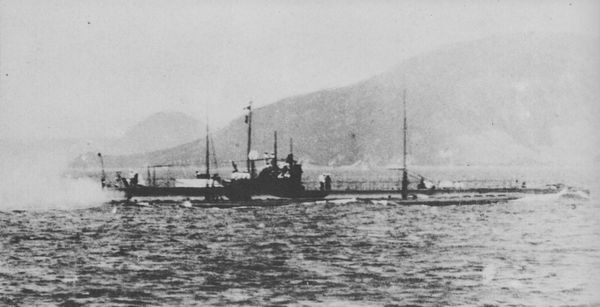
Ro-15 in 1920s

Project number S18. The Kaichū II had an increased range compared with the Kaichū I, and the turning torpedo tubes were removed.

- Boats in class

Boat	Builder	Laid down	Launched	Completed	Fate
Submarine No. 23; Ro-13	Kure Naval Arsenal	14-09-1918	26-08-1919	30-09-1920 as Submarine No. 23	Renamed Ro-13 01-11-1924. Decommissioned 01-04-1932.
Submarine No. 22; Ro-14	Kure Naval Arsenal	14-09-1918	31-03-1919	17-02-1921 as Submarine No. 22	Renamed Ro-14 01-11-1924. Decommissioned 01-09-1933.
Submarine No. 24; Ro-15	Kure Naval Arsenal	12-06-1920	14-10-1920	30-06-1921 as Submarine No. 24	Renamed Ro-15 01-11-1924. Decommissioned 01-09-1933.

=== Kaichū III (Ro-16 class) ===
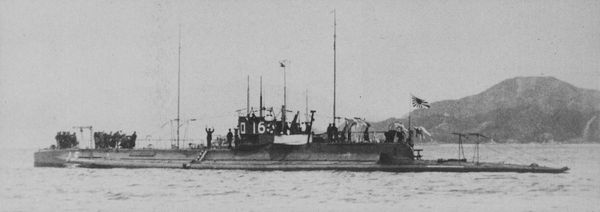
Ro-16 in 1920s

Project number S18. Their project number was the same as in the Kaichū II type submarine, however their performance was improved.

- Boats in class

Boat	Builder	Laid down	Launched	Completed	Fate
Submarine No. 37; Ro-16	Kure Naval Arsenal	18-11-1920	22-04-1921	29-04-1922 as Submarine No. 37	Renamed Ro-16 01-11-1924. Decommissioned 01-09-1933.
Submarine No. 34; Ro-17	Kure Naval Arsenal	24-09-1920	24-02-1921	20-10-1921 as Submarine No. 34	Renamed Ro-17 01-11-1924. Decommissioned 01-04-1936.
Submarine No. 35; Ro-18	Kure Naval Arsenal	20-10-1920	25-03-1921	15-12-1921 as Submarine No. 35	Renamed Ro-18 01-11-1924. Decommissioned 01-04-1936.
Submarine No. 36; Ro-19	Kure Naval Arsenal	09-09-1920	28-12-1920	15-03-1922 as Submarine No. 36	Renamed Ro-19 01-11-1924. Decommissioned 01-04-1936.
Submarine No. 38; Ro-20	Yokosuka Naval Arsenal	28-07-1919	26-10-1920	01-02-1922 as Submarine No. 38	Renamed Ro-20 01-11-1924. Decommissioned 01-04-1934.
Submarine No. 39; Ro-21	Yokosuka Naval Arsenal	28-07-1919	26-10-1920	01-02-1922 as Submarine No. 39	Renamed Ro-21 01-11-1924. Decommissioned 01-04-1934.
Submarine No. 40; Ro-22	Yokosuka Naval Arsenal	22-01-1921	15-10-1921	10-10-1922 as Submarine No. 40	Renamed Ro-22 01-11-1924. Decommissioned 01-04-1934.
Submarine No. 41; Ro-23	Yokosuka Naval Arsenal	22-01-1921	15-10-1921	28-04-1923 as Submarine No. 41	Renamed Ro-23 01-11-1924. Decommissioned 01-04-1935.
Submarine No. 42; Ro-24	Sasebo Naval Arsenal	21-04-1919	08-12-1919	30-11-1920 as Submarine No. 42	Renamed Ro-24 01-11-1924. Decommissioned 01-04-1935.
Submarine No. 43; Ro-25	Sasebo Naval Arsenal	19-02-1920	17-07-1920	25-10-1921 as Submarine No. 43	Renamed Ro-25 01-11-1924. Decommissioned 01-04-1936.

=== Kaichū IV (Ro-26 class) ===
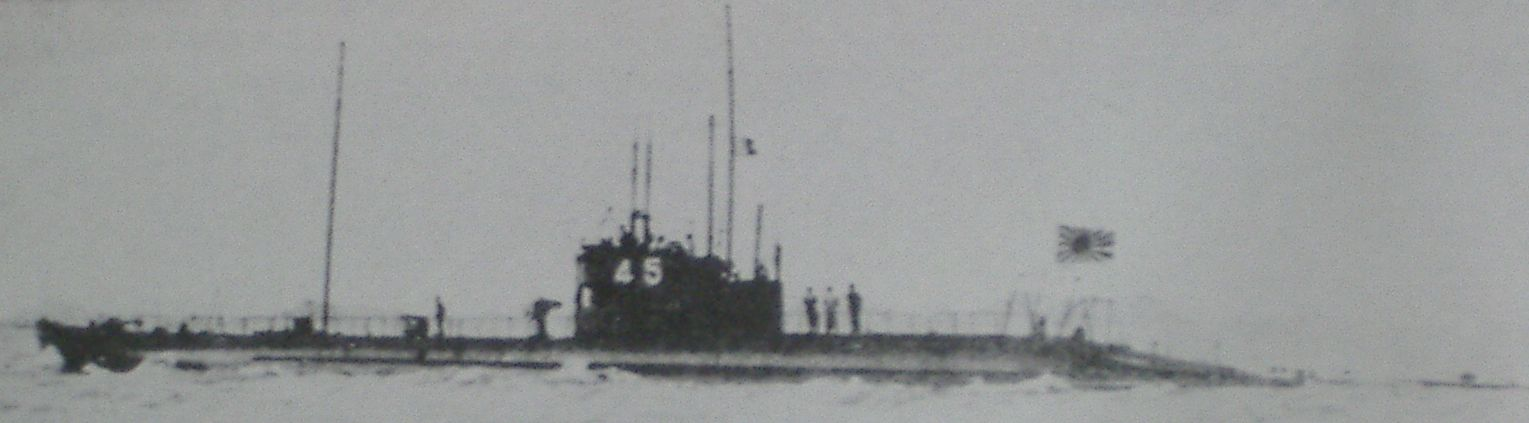
Ro-26 in 1923

Project number S18A. Improved model from the Kaichū III type.

- Boats in class

Boat	Builder	Laid down	Launched	Completed	Fate
Submarine No. 45; Ro-26	Sasebo Naval Arsenal	10-03-1921	18-10-1921	25-01-1923 as Submarine No. 45	Renamed Ro-26 01-11-1924. Decommissioned 01-04-1940. Scrapped 1948. Her anchor is displaying at Yokosuka Naval Base.
Submarine No. 58; Ro-27	Yokosuka Naval Arsenal	16-07-1921	22-07-1922	31-07-1924 as Submarine No. 58	Renamed Ro-27 01-11-1924. Decommissioned 01-04-1936. Scrapped 1948.
Submarine No. 62; Ro-28	Sasebo Naval Arsenal	10-11-1921	13-04-1922	30-11-1923 as Submarine No. 62	Renamed Ro-28 01-11-1924. Decommissioned 01-04-1940. Scrapped 1948.

=== Kaichū V (Toku-Chū, Ro-29 class) ===
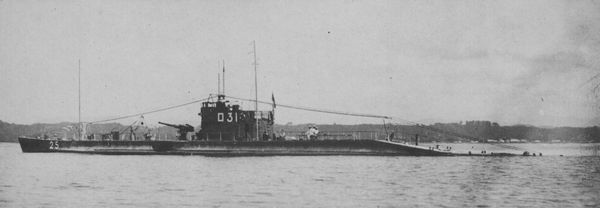
Ro-31 in 1935

Project number S18B. They were built for the commerce raiding role. The IJN official designation of these boats was Special Purpose-Medium Type submarine (特中型潜水艦, Toku-Chū-gata sensuikan).

- Boats in class

Boat	Builder	Laid down	Launched	Completed	Fate
Submarine No. 68; Ro-29	Kawasaki-Kōbe Shipyard	02-06-1921	05-12-1922	15-09-1923 as Submarine No. 68	Renamed Ro-29 01-11-1924. Decommissioned 01-04-1936.
Submarine No. 69; Ro-30	Kawasaki-Kōbe Shipyard	27-06-1921	18-01-1923	29-04-1924 as Submarine No. 69	Renamed Ro-30 01-11-1924. Decommissioned 01-04-1942. Scrapped 1945.
Submarine No. 70	Kawasaki-Kōbe Shipyard	25-09-1921	15-02-1923 as Submarine No. 70		Lost in an accident off Awaji Island 21-08-1923. Salvaged and scrapped October 1923. Her materials were used for Ro-31.
Ro-31	Kawasaki-Kōbe Shipyard	20-12-1924	25-09-1926	10-05-1927	Decommissioned 25-05-1945. Scuttled off Sasebo 05-04-1946.
Submarine No. 71; Ro-32	Kawasaki-Kōbe Shipyard	24-10-1921	19-03-1923	21-05-1924 as Submarine No. 71	Renamed Ro-32 01-11-1924. Decommissioned 01-04-1942. Scrapped 1945.

=== Kaichū VI (Ro-33 class) ===
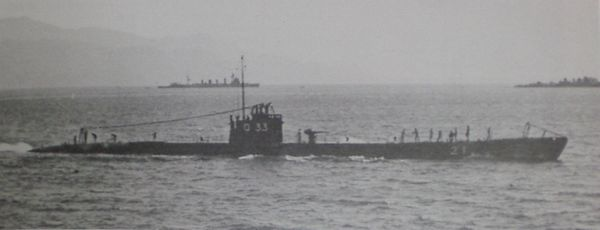
Ro-33 in 1939

Project number S30. They were planned as a prototype for a mass production submarines in the wartime under the Maru 1 Programme.

- Boats in class

Boat	Builder	Laid down	Launched	Completed	Results	Fate
Ro-33	Kure Naval Arsenal	08-08-1933	10-10-1934	07-10-1935	Sank Australian merchant ship MV Mamutu 07-08-1942	Sunk by HMAS Arunta and RAF patrol aircraft off Port Moresby 29-08-1942.
Ro-34	Mitsubishi-Kōbe Shipyard	25-04-1934	12-12-1935	31-05-1937		Sunk by USS O'Bannon and USS Strong near Russell Islands 06-04-1943.

=== Kaichū VII (Sen-Chū, Ro-35 class) ===
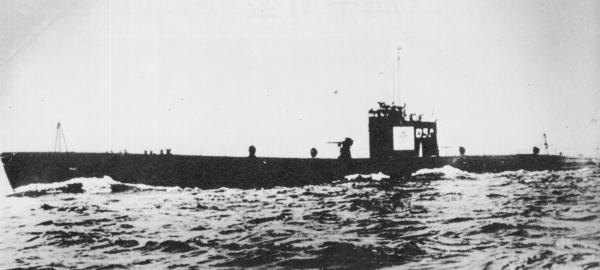
Ro-50 in 1944

Project number S44. The final design in the Kaichū series. They were equipped with a Freon air-conditioner, because the IJN took into consideration that they were to be active on the equator area too. The official IJN designation of these boats was Medium Type submarine (中型潜水艦, Chū-gata sensuikan), also called for short, Medium Type (中型, Chū-gata) or Submarine-Medium Type (潜中型, Sen-Chū-gata).
The IJN planned to build these boats under the following Naval Armaments Supplement Programmes:

- 9 boats in the Maru Rin Programme (Boat # 201 - 209)
- 12 boats in the Maru Kyū Programme (Boat # 385 - 396)
- 15 boats in the Maru Tui Programme (Boat # 640 - 654)
- 43 boats in the Kai-Maru 5 Programme (Boat # 5181 - 5223)

However some of the boats were cancelled and their naval budgets, materials and staffs were transferred to the I-201 class submarines.

- Boats in class

Boat No.	Boat	Builder	Laid down	Launched	Completed	Results	Fate
201	Ro-35	Mitsubishi-Kōbe Shipyard	09-10-1941	09-06-1942	25-03-1943		Sunk by USS Patterson near of Espiritu Santo 25-08-1943.
202	Ro-36	Mitsubishi-Kōbe Shipyard	07-03-1942	14-10-1942	27-05-1943		Sunk by USS Melvin north of Saipan 13-06-1944.
203	Ro-37	Sasebo Naval Arsenal	09-10-1941	30-06-1942	30-06-1943	Damaged USS Cache 22-01-1944	Sunk by USS Buchanan near of Santa Cruz Islands 11°47′S 164°17′E 22-01-1944.
204	Ro-38	Mitsubishi-Kōbe Shipyard	20-06-1942	24-12-1942	24-07-1943		Disappeared after 19-11-1943.
205	Ro-39	Mitsubishi-Kōbe Shipyard	08-08-1942	06-03-1943	12-09-1943		Sunk by USS Charrette and USS Fair east of Wotje Atoll 06°48′N 168°08′E 03-02-1944.
206	Ro-40	Mitsubishi-Kōbe Shipyard	08-08-1942	06-03-1943	28-09-1943		Sunk by USS Phelps north of Marshall Islands 09°50′N 166°35′E 16-02-1944.
207	Ro-41	Mitsubishi-Kōbe Shipyard	06-10-1942	05-05-1943	26-11-1943	Sank USS Shelton 03-10-1944	Sunk by USS Haggard south of Okinawa 22°57′N 132°19′E 23-03-1945.
208	Ro-42	Sasebo Naval Arsenal	27-04-1942	25-10-1942	31-08-1943		Sunk by USS Bangust northeast of Marshall Islands 10°05′N 168°22′E 10-06-1945.
209	Ro-43	Mitsubishi-Kōbe Shipyard	06-10-1942	05-06-1943	16-12-1943	Damaged USS Renshaw 21-02-1945	Sunk by aircraft from USS Anzio off Iwo Jima 25°07′N 140°19′E 27-02-1945.
385	Ro-44	Mitsui-Tamano Shipyard	14-02-1942	11-11-1942	13-09-1943		Sunk by USS Burden R. Hastings near of Enewetak 11°13′N 164°15′E 16-06-1944.
386	Ro-45	Mitsubishi-Kōbe Shipyard	20-10-1942	21-07-1943	11-01-1944		Sunk by USS Macdonough, USS Stephen Potter and aircraft from USS Monterey south of Truk 06°13′N 151°19′E 01-05-1944.
387	Ro-46	Mitsui-Tamano Shipyard	13-06-1942	23-04-1943	19-02-1944	Damaged USS Cavalier 29-01-1945	Sunk by aircraft from USS Tulagi near of Oki Daitō 24°15′N 131°16′E 29-04-1945.
388	Ro-47	Mitsubishi-Kōbe Shipyard	28-12-1942	20-08-1943	31-01-1944		Sunk by USS McCoy Reynolds northeast of Palau 09°19′N 136°44′E 26-09-1944.
389	Ro-48	Mitsubishi-Kōbe Shipyard	17-03-1943	15-10-1943	31-03-1944		(1) Sunk by USS William C. Miller northwest of Saipan 14-07-1944. (2) Sunk by USS Wyman northwest of Saipan 18-07-1944.
390	Ro-49	Mitsui-Tamano Shipyard	16-11-1942	03-08-1943	19-05-1944		Sunk by USS Hudson.
391	Ro-50	Mitsui-Tamano Shipyard	18-02-1943	27-11-1943	31-07-1944	Sank USS LST-577 11-02-1945	Decommissioned 30-11-1945. Sunk as target off Gotō Islands 01-04-1946.
392 - 395							Cancelled in 1943.
396	Ro-55	Mitsui-Tamano Shipyard	05-08-1943	23-04-1944	30-09-1944		Sunk by USS Thomason west of Luzon 15°27′N 119°25′E 07-02-1945.
640 - 644							Cancelled in 1943.
645	Ro-56 (ex-Ro-75)	Mitsui-Tamano Shipyard	02-12-1943 as Ro-75	05-07-1944	15-11-1944		Sunk by USS Mertz and USS Monssen near of Oki Daitō 26°09′N 130°21′E 09-04-1945.
646 - 654							Cancelled in 1943.
5181 - 5223							Cancelled in 1943.

== Characteristics ==
Type		Kaichū I (Ro-11)	Kaichū II (Ro-13)	Kaichū III (Ro-16)	Kaichū IV (Ro-26)
Displacement	Surfaced	720 long tons (732 t)	740 long tons (752 t)	740 long tons (752 t)	750 long tons (762 t)
Displacement	Submerged	1,000 long tons (1,016 t)	1,003.1 long tons (1,019 t)	997 long tons (1,013 t)	1,080 long tons (1,097 t)
Length (overall)		69.19 m (227 ft 0 in)	70.10 m (230 ft 0 in)	70.10 m (230 ft 0 in)	74.22 m (243 ft 6 in)
Beam		6.35 m (20 ft 10 in)	6.10 m (20 ft 0 in)	6.12 m (20 ft 1 in)	6.12 m (20 ft 1 in)
Draft		3.43 m (11 ft 3 in)	3.68 m (12 ft 1 in)	3.70 m (12 ft 2 in)	3.73 m (12 ft 3 in)
Power plant and shaft		2 × Sulzer Mk.2 diesels 2 shafts	2 × Sulzer Mk.2 diesels 2 shafts	2 × Sulzer Mk.2 diesels 2 shafts	2 × Sulzer Mk.2 diesels 2 shafts
Power	Surfaced	2,900 bhp	2,900 bhp	2,900 bhp	2,900 bhp
Power	Submerged	1,200 shp	1,200 shp	1,200 shp	1,200 shp
Speed	Surfaced	18.2 knots (33.7 km/h)	16.5 knots (30.6 km/h)	16.5 knots (30.6 km/h)	16.0 knots (29.6 km/h)
Speed	Submerged	9.1 knots (16.9 km/h)	8.5 knots (15.7 km/h)	8.5 knots (15.7 km/h)	8.5 knots (15.7 km/h)
Range	Surfaced	4,000 nmi (7,400 km) at 10 knots (19 km/h)	6,000 nmi (11,000 km) at 10 knots (19 km/h)	6,000 nmi (11,000 km) at 10 knots (19 km/h)	6,000 nmi (11,000 km) at 10 knots (19 km/h)
Range	Submerged	85 nmi (157 km) at 4 knots (7.4 km/h)	85 nmi (157 km) at 4 knots (7.4 km/h)	85 nmi (157 km) at 4 knots (7.4 km/h)	85 nmi (157 km) at 4 knots (7.4 km/h)
Test depth		30 m (98 ft)	30 m (98 ft)	45.7 m (150 ft)	45.7 m (150 ft)
Fuel		58.4 tons	75 tons	75 tons	75 tons
Complement		43	43	46	46
Armament (initial)		• 6 × 450 mm (18 in) TTs (4 × front, 2 × turret) • 10 × Type 44 torpedoes • 1 × 76.2 mm (3.00 in) L/23.5 5th Year Type AA gun	• 6 × 450 mm (18 in) TTs (4 × front, 2 × upper deck) • 10 × Type 44 torpedoes • 1 × 76.2 mm (3.00 in) L/23.5 5th Year Type AA gun	• 6 × 450 mm (18 in) TTs (4 × front, 2 × upper deck) • 10 × Type 44 torpedoes • 1 × 76.2 mm (3.00 in) L/23.5 5th Year Type AA gun	• 4 × 533 mm (21 in) TTs (4 × front) • 8 × 6th Year Type torpedoes • 1 × 76.2 mm (3.00 in) L/23.5 5th Year Type AA gun

Type		Kaichū V (Ro-29)	Kaichū VI (Ro-33)	Kaichū VII (Ro-35)
Displacement	Surfaced	852 long tons (866 t)	700 long tons (711 t)	960 long tons (975 t)
Displacement	Submerged	1,030 long tons (1,047 t)	1,200 long tons (1,219 t)	1,447 long tons (1,470 t)
Length (overall)		74.22 m (243 ft 6 in)	73.00 m (239 ft 6 in)	80.50 m (264 ft 1 in)
Beam		6.12 m (20 ft 1 in)	6.70 m (22 ft 0 in)	7.05 m (23 ft 2 in)
Draft		3.73 m (12 ft 3 in)	3.25 m (10 ft 8 in)	4.07 m (13 ft 4 in)
Power plant and shaft		2 × Sulzer Mk.1 diesels 2 shafts	2 × Kampon Mk.21 Model 8 diesels 2 shafts	2 × Kampon Mk.22 Model 10 diesels 2 shafts
Power	Surfaced	1,200 bhp	3,000 bhp	4,200 bhp
Power	Submerged	1,200 shp	1,200 shp	1,200 shp
Speed	Surfaced	13.0 knots (24.1 km/h)	19.0 knots (35.2 km/h)	19.8 knots (36.7 km/h)
Speed	Submerged	8.5 knots (15.7 km/h)	8.2 knots (15.2 km/h)	8.0 knots (14.8 km/h)
Range	Surfaced	6,000 nmi (11,000 km) at 10 knots (19 km/h)	8,000 nmi (15,000 km) at 12 knots (22 km/h)	5,000 nmi (9,300 km) at 16 knots (30 km/h)
Range	Submerged	85 nmi (157 km) at 4 knots (7.4 km/h)	90 nmi (170 km) at 3.5 knots (6.5 km/h)	45 nmi (83 km) at 5 knots (9.3 km/h)
Test depth		45.7 m (150 ft)	75 m (246 ft)	80 m (260 ft)
Fuel		143 tons	109 tons	218 tons
Complement		44	61	61
Armament (initial)		• 4 × 533 mm (21 in) TTs (4 × front) • 8 × 6th Year Type torpedoes • 1 × 120 mm (4.7 in) L/45 11th Year Type Naval gun • 1 × 6.5 mm machine gun	• 4 × 533 mm (21 in) TTs (4 × front) • 8 × Type 89 torpedoes • 1 × 76.2 mm (3.00 in) L/40 11th Year Type AA gun • 1 × 13.2 mm (0.52 in) Type 93 AA gun	• 4 × 533 mm (21 in) TTs (4 × front) • 10 × Type 95 torpedoes • 1 × 76.2 mm (3.00 in) L/40 11th Year Type AA gun • 2 × Type 96 25mm AA guns

== Bibliography ==
- "Rekishi Gunzō"., History of Pacific War Vol.17 I-Gō Submarines, Gakken (Japan), January 1998, ISBN 4-05-601767-0
- Rekishi Gunzō, History of Pacific War Extra, "Perfect guide, The submarines of the Imperial Japanese Forces", Gakken (Japan), March 2005, ISBN 4-05-603890-2
- The Maru Special, Japanese Naval Vessels No.43 Japanese Submarines III, Ushio Shobō (Japan), September 1980, Book code 68343-44
- The Maru Special, Japanese Naval Vessels No.132 Japanese Submarines I "Revised edition", Ushio Shobō (Japan), February 1988, Book code 68344-36
- The Maru Special, Japanese Naval Vessels No.133 Japanese Submarines II "Revised edition", Ushio Shobō (Japan), March 1988, Book code 68344-37
- The Maru Special, Japanese Naval Vessels No.135 Japanese Submarines IV, Ushio Shobō (Japan), May 1988, Book code 68344-39
