= Japanese submarine I-42 =

Type B2 submarine

History

Japan
- Name: Submarine No. 372
- Builder: Kure Naval Arsenal
- Laid down: 18 March 1942
- Renamed: I-42 on 20 August 1942
- Launched: 10 November 1942
- Completed: 3 November 1943
- Commissioned: 3 November 1943
- Fate: Sunk, 23 March 1944
- Stricken: 30 April 1944

General characteristics
- Class & type: Type B2 submarine
- Displacement: 2,624 tons surfaced; 3,700 tons submerged
- Length: 356.5 ft (108.7 m)
- Beam: 30.5 ft (9.3 m)
- Draft: 17 ft (5.2 m)
- Propulsion: 2 diesels: 11,000 hp (8,200 kW); Electric motors: 2,000 hp (1,500 kW)
- Speed: 23.5 knots (43.5 km/h) surfaced; 8 knots (15 km/h) submerged
- Range: 14,000 nautical miles (26,000 km) at 16 knots (30 km/h)
- Test depth: 100 m (330 ft)
- Complement: 114
- Armament: 6 × 533 mm (21 in) forward torpedo tubes; 17 torpedoes; 1 × 14 cm (5.5 in) Deck Gun

I-42 was an Imperial Japanese Navy Type B2 submarine. Completed and commissioned in 1943, she served in World War II and was sunk during her first war patrol in March 1944.

== Construction and commissioning ==
I-42 was laid down on 18 March 1942 at the Kure Navy Yard at Kure, Japan, with the name Submarine No. 372. Renamed I-42 on 20 August 1942 and provisionally attached to the Yokosuka Naval District that day, she was launched on 10 November 1942. She was completed and commissioned on 3 November 1943.

== Service history ==
Upon commissioning, I-42 was attached formally to the Yokosuka Naval District. In late November 1943 she took part with the submarines I-43, I-184, Ro-40, and Ro-113 and the submarine tender Chōgei in antisubmarine warfare exercises in the Iyo-nada in the Seto Inland Sea. By 1 January 1944, she was part of Submarine Division 11 in Submarine Squadron 7 along with I-43, I-184, Ro-40, Ro-113, and the submarines I-52, I-183, Ro-41, Ro-43, Ro-114, and Ro-115. On 31 January 1944, she was reassigned to Submarine Division 15 in the 6th Fleet.

On 12 February 1944, I-42 departed Yokosuka on her first war patrol, assigned a patrol area northeast of Truk. She reached her patrol area on 20 February 1944. She called at Saipan in the Mariana Islands from 3 to 4 March 1944, then proceeded to Truk, where she arrived on 7 March 1944. She got back underway on 15 March 1944 to make a supply run to Palau, which she reached on 19 March 1944. After embarking cargo and passengers, she departed Palau on 23 March 1944 on a supply run to Rabaul on New Britain, with an estimated date of arrival of 30 March 1944.

I-42 was zigzagging on the surface at 18 knots (33 km/h; 21 mph) on the first evening of her voyage when the United States Navy submarine USS Tunny, which had been alerted to I-42′s schedule by Ultra intelligence information, detected I-42 on radar at a range of 13,000 yards (11,900 m) at 21:19 on 23 March 1944. Also on the surface, Tunny closed to within visual range and identified I-42 as a Japanese I-boat. I-42 also sighted Tunny, and for almost 90 minutes each submarine maneuvered on the surface to obtain a firing position against the other while trying to deny one to her opponent. Finally, at 23:24, when the two submarines were 6 nautical miles (11 km; 6.9 mi) southwest of Angaur, Tunny fired four torpedoes at I-42 at a range of 1,900 yards (1,700 m), then immediately turned hard to starboard to avoid a collision and crash-dived to prevent I-42 from making a torpedo attack of her own. Just before Tunny′s hatch closed, her crew saw a bright flash and felt and heard two explosions. Diving to 150 feet (46 m), Tunny circled the area, and her sound operator heard I-42′s propeller noises stop. Tunny′s crew heard the noises of I-42 breaking up for the next hour. I-42 sank with the loss of all 102 men aboard at 06°40′N 134°03′E.

On 27 April 1944, the Imperial Japanese Navy declared I-42 to be presumed lost with all hands north of the Admiralty Islands. She was stricken from the Navy list on 30 April 1944.

== Sources ==
- Hackett, Bob & Kingsepp, Sander. IJN Submarine I-42: Tabular Record of Movement. Retrieved on September 5, 2020.
