= Japanese submarine Ro-40 =

Kaichū-type submarine

History

Japan
- Name: Submarine No. 206
- Builder: Mitsubishi, Kobe, Japan
- Laid down: 8 August 1942
- Renamed: Ro-40 on 5 February 1943
- Launched: 6 March 1943
- Completed: 28 September 1943
- Commissioned: 28 September 1943
- Fate: Sunk 16 February 1944
- Stricken: 30 April 1944

General characteristics
- Class & type: Kaichū type submarine (K6 subclass)
- Displacement: 1,133 tonnes (1,115 long tons) surfaced; 1,470 tonnes (1,447 long tons) submerged
- Length: 80.5 m (264 ft 1 in) overall
- Beam: 7 m (23 ft 0 in)
- Draft: 4.07 m (13 ft 4 in)
- Installed power: 4,200 bhp (3,100 kW) (diesel); 1,200 hp (890 kW) (electric motor)
- Propulsion: Diesel-electric; 1 × diesel engine; 1 × electric motor
- Speed: 19.75 knots (36.58 km/h; 22.73 mph) surfaced; 8 knots (15 km/h; 9.2 mph) submerged
- Range: 5,000 nmi (9,300 km; 5,800 mi) at 16 knots (30 km/h; 18 mph) surfaced; 45 nmi (83 km; 52 mi) at 5 knots (9.3 km/h; 5.8 mph) submerged
- Test depth: 80 m (260 ft)
- Crew: 61
- Armament: 4 × bow 533 mm (21 in) torpedo tubes; 1 × 76.2 mm (3.00 in) L/40 anti-aircraft gun; 2 × single 25 mm (1.0 in) AA guns

Ro-40 was an Imperial Japanese Navy Kaichū type submarine of the K6 sub-class. Completed and commissioned in September 1943, she served in World War II and was sunk in February 1944 during her first war patrol.

== Design and description ==
The submarines of the K6 sub-class were versions of the preceding K5 sub-class with greater range and diving depth. They displaced 1,133 tonnes (1,115 long tons) surfaced and 1,470 tonnes (1,447 long tons) submerged. The submarines were 80.5 meters (264 ft 1 in) long, had a beam of 7 meters (23 ft 0 in) and a draft of 4.07 meters (13 ft 4 in). They had a diving depth of 80 meters (260 ft).

For surface running, the boats were powered by two 2,100-brake-horsepower (1,566 kW) diesel engines, each driving one propeller shaft. When submerged each propeller was driven by a 600-horsepower (447 kW) electric motor. They could reach 19.75 knots (36.58 km/h; 22.73 mph) on the surface and 8 knots (15 km/h; 9.2 mph) underwater. On the surface, the K6s had a range of 11,000 nautical miles (20,000 km; 13,000 mi) at 12 knots (22 km/h; 14 mph); submerged, they had a range of 45 nmi (83 km; 52 mi) at 5 knots (9.3 km/h; 5.8 mph).

The boats were armed with four internal bow 53.3 cm (21.0 in) torpedo tubes and carried a total of ten torpedoes. They were also armed with a single 76.2 mm (3.00 in) L/40 anti-aircraft gun and two single 25 mm (1.0 in) AA guns.

== Construction and commissioning ==
Ro-40 was laid down on 8 August 1942 by Mitsubishi at Kobe, Japan, with the name Submarine No. 206. She was renamed Ro-40 on 5 February 1943 and was attached provisionally to the Maizuru Naval District that day. She was launched on 6 March 1943 and completed and commissioned on 28 September 1943.

== Service history ==
Upon commissioning, Ro-40 was attached formally to the Maizuru Naval District and assigned to Submarine Squadron 11 for workups. During a training cruise, she collided with the sailing vessel Okaki Maru in the Seto Inland Sea 3 nautical miles (5.6 km; 3.5 mi) off Murozumi Lighthouse on 5 October 1943, with both ships suffering minor damage. In late November 1943, she took part in antisubmarine warfare exercises in the Iyo Nada in the Seto Inland Sea with the submarine tender Chōgei and the submarines I-42, I-43, I-184, and Ro-113. She called at Tokuyama to refuel from 2 to 4 December 1943.

As of 1 January 1944, Ro-40 was assigned to Submarine Division 11 in Submarine Squadron 7 along with I-42, I-43, I-184, Ro-113, and the submarines I-52, I-183, Ro-41, Ro-43, and Ro-114. On 15 January 1944, she was reassigned to Submarine Division 34. She departed Maizuru on 20 January 1944 bound for Truk, which she reached on 29 January 1944.

Ro-40 got underway from Truk on 12 February 1944 to begin her first war patrol, ordered to operate in the Marshall Islands and then proceed to a patrol area east of the Gilbert Islands in the vicinity of Makin Island. The Japanese never heard from her again.

On 16 February 1944, the United States Navy destroyer USS Phelps (DD-360) was 45 nautical miles (83 km; 52 mi) northwest of Kwajalein when she made sonar contact at a range of 1,700 yards (1,600 m) on a submerged submarine approaching the convoy she was screening. After Phelps dropped a pattern of 13 depth charges, the destroyer USS MacDonough (DD-351) and minesweeper USS Sage (AM-111) also depth-charged the submarine, sinking it at 09°50′N 166°35′E.

The submarine Phelps, MacDonough, and Sage sank probably was Ro-40. The commander-in-chief of the 6th Fleet, Vice Admiral Takeo Takagi, ordered her to a new patrol area between Kwajalein and Eniwetok on 20 February 1944 and ordered her to return to Truk on 4 March 1944, but she did not acknowledge either order. On 28 March 1944, the Imperial Japanese Navy declared her to be presumed lost in the Gilbert Islands area with all 61 hands. She was stricken from the Navy list on 30 April 1944.
