= Japanese submarine I-43 =

Type B2 submarine

History

Japan
- Name: Submarine No. 373
- Builder: Sasebo Naval Arsenal, Sasebo, Japan
- Laid down: 27 April 1942
- Renamed: I-43 on 25 September 1942
- Launched: 25 October 1942
- Completed: 5 November 1943
- Commissioned: 5 November 1943
- Fate: Sunk, 15 February 1944
- Stricken: 30 April 1944

General characteristics
- Class & type: Type B2 submarine
- Displacement: 2,624 tons surfaced; 3,700 tons submerged
- Length: 356.5 ft (108.7 m)
- Beam: 30.5 ft (9.3 m)
- Draft: 17 ft (5.2 m)
- Propulsion: 2 diesels: 11,000 hp (8,200 kW); Electric motors: 2,000 hp (1,500 kW)
- Speed: 23.5 knots (43.5 km/h) surfaced; 8 knots (15 km/h) submerged
- Range: 14,000 nautical miles (26,000 km) at 16 knots (30 km/h)
- Test depth: 100 m (330 ft)
- Boats & landing craft carried: 1 x Daihatsu-class landing craft (added late 1943)
- Complement: 114
- Armament: 6 × 533 mm (21 in) forward torpedo tubes; 17 torpedoes; 1 × 14 cm (5.5 in) deck gun (removed late 1943)

I-43 was an Imperial Japanese Navy Type B2 submarine. Completed and commissioned in 1943, she served in World War II and was sunk during her first deployment in February 1944.

== Construction and commissioning ==
I-42 was laid down on 27 April 1942 at the Sasebo Navy Yard at Sasebo, Japan, with the name Submarine No. 373. Renamed I-43 on 25 September 1942 and provisionally attached to the Yokosuka Naval District that day, she was launched on 25 October 1942. Formally attached to the Yokosuka Naval District a year later on 25 October 1943, she was completed and commissioned on 5 November 1943.

== Service history ==
=== November 1943–February 1944 ===
Upon commissioning, I-43 was assigned to Submarine Squadron 11. After she completed her work-ups, her 140-millimeter (5.5 in) deck gun was removed from her afterdeck and replaced by fittings that allowed her to carry a 46-foot (14 m) waterproofed Daihatsu-class landing craft abaft her conning tower. On 15 November 1943, she was reassigned to Submarine Division 11 in the 6th Fleet along with the submarines I-42, I-45, I-52, I-183, I-184, Ro-40, Ro-41, Ro-43, Ro-113, Ro-114, and Ro-115. In late November 1943, she took part in antisubmarine warfare exercises in the Iyo Nada in the Seto Inland Sea with I-42, I-184, Ro-40, Ro-113, and the submarine tender Chōgei. She moved from Sasebo to Yokosuka during December 1943 and from Yokosuka to Kure in January 1944.

On 9 February 1944, I-43 got underway from Kure to perform a special mission in which she was to transport Special Naval Landing Forces (SNLF) personnel from Saipan in the Mariana Islands to Truk as part of a build-up of forces for a planned Japanese counterlanding on the Green Islands. While at sea, she was reassigned to Submarine Division 15 in the 6th Fleet on 11 February 1944. She arrived at Saipan on 13 February 1944 and embarked 59 SNLF personnel there. On 14 February 1944, she received orders from the 6th Fleet to proceed to Truk, and she put to sea that day with an estimated date of arrival at Truk of 16 February 1944.

=== Loss ===
On 15 February 1944, I-43 was 280 nautical miles (520 km; 320 mi) east-southeast of Guam when the United States Navy submarine USS Aspro — operating submerged in the area in support of the upcoming Operation Hailstone, a major U.S. Navy raid on Truk — detected her propeller noises at 11:06. At 11:21, Aspro′s commanding officer sighted I-43 heading south-southeast on the surface, zigzagging and making 17 knots (31 km/h; 20 mph) on a heading of 155 degrees true. He identified her as an "I-9-class" submarine, and noted the number "443" — probably the Japanese character for "I" followed by "43" — and a hinomaru flag painted on her conning tower, as well as a large structure abaft her conning tower — apparently her waterproof Daihatsu — which he thought might be a midget submarine.

Out of position for a submerged attack, Aspro allowed I-43 to pass, surfaced at 12:07, and began a lengthy, radar-assisted maneuver known to American submariners as an "end-around" to get herself into a favorable firing position ahead of I-43. Finally ahead of I-43 that evening, Aspro fired four Mark XIV-3A torpedoes at her at a range of 2,100 yards (1,900 m) at 22:23. At 22:24, two of them hit I-43, which exploded and sank by the stern at 10°23′N 150°23′E. Aspro′s crew heard several more explosions after I-43 sank, the last of them at 22:27.

On 8 April 1944, the Imperial Japanese Navy declared I-43 to be presumed lost in the vicinity of Truk with the loss of all 166 men on board. She was stricken from the Navy list on 30 April 1944.

== Sources ==
- Hackett, Bob & Kingsepp, Sander. IJN Submarine I-43: Tabular Record of Movement. Retrieved on September 5, 2020.
