= Japanese submarine Ro-36 =

History

Japan
- Name: Submarine No. 202
- Builder: Mitsubishi, Kobe, Japan
- Laid down: 7 March 1942
- Renamed: Ro-36 on 25 September 1942
- Launched: 14 October 1942
- Completed: 27 May 1943
- Commissioned: 27 May 1943
- Fate: Probably sunk 13 June 1944
- Stricken: 10 August 1944

General characteristics
- Class & type: Kaichū type submarine (K6 subclass)
- Displacement: 1,133 tonnes (1,115 long tons) surfaced; 1,470 tonnes (1,447 long tons) submerged
- Length: 80.5 m (264 ft 1 in) overall
- Beam: 7 m (23 ft 0 in)
- Draft: 4.07 m (13 ft 4 in)
- Installed power: 4,200 bhp (3,100 kW) (diesel); 1,200 hp (890 kW) (electric motor)
- Propulsion: Diesel-electric; 1 × diesel engine; 1 × electric motor
- Speed: 19.75 knots (36.58 km/h; 22.73 mph) surfaced; 8 knots (15 km/h; 9.2 mph) submerged
- Range: 5,000 nmi (9,300 km; 5,800 mi) at 16 knots (30 km/h; 18 mph) surfaced; 45 nmi (83 km; 52 mi) at 5 knots (9.3 km/h; 5.8 mph) submerged
- Test depth: 80 m (260 ft)
- Crew: 61
- Armament: 4 × bow 533 mm (21 in) torpedo tubes; 1 × 76.2 mm (3.00 in) L/40 anti-aircraft gun; 2 × single 25 mm (1.0 in) AA guns

Ro-36 was an Imperial Japanese Navy Kaichū type submarine of the K6 sub-class. Completed and commissioned in May 1943, she served in World War II, conducting four war patrols in the Pacific Ocean before she was sunk in June 1944.

== Design and description ==
The submarines of the K6 sub-class were versions of the preceding K5 sub-class with greater range and diving depth. They displaced 1,133 tonnes (1,115 long tons) surfaced and 1,470 tonnes (1,447 long tons) submerged. The submarines were 80.5 meters (264 ft 1 in) long, had a beam of 7 meters (23 ft 0 in) and a draft of 4.07 meters (13 ft 4 in). They had a diving depth of 80 meters (260 ft).

For surface running, the boats were powered by two 2,100-brake-horsepower (1,566 kW) diesel engines, each driving one propeller shaft. When submerged each propeller was driven by a 600-horsepower (447 kW) electric motor. They could reach 19.75 knots (36.58 km/h; 22.73 mph) on the surface and 8 knots (15 km/h; 9.2 mph) underwater. On the surface, the K6s had a range of 11,000 nautical miles (20,000 km; 13,000 mi) at 12 knots (22 km/h; 14 mph); submerged, they had a range of 45 nmi (83 km; 52 mi) at 5 knots (9.3 km/h; 5.8 mph).

The boats were armed with four internal bow 53.3 cm (21.0 in) torpedo tubes and carried a total of ten torpedoes. They were also armed with a single 76.2 mm (3.00 in) L/40 anti-aircraft gun and two single 25 mm (1.0 in) AA guns.

== Construction and commissioning ==
Ro-36 was laid down as Submarine No. 202 on 7 March 1942 by Mitsubishi at Kobe, Japan. She was renamed Ro-36 on 25 September 1942, and was provisionally attached to the Maizuru Naval District that day. She was launched on 14 October 1942 and completed and commissioned on 27 May 1943.

== Service history ==
Upon commissioning, Ro-36 was attached formally to the Maizuru Naval District, and on 31 May 1943 she was assigned to Submarine Squadron 11 for workups. On 20 August 1943 she was reassigned directly to 6th Fleet headquarters, and she departed Maizuru bound for Truk on 5 September 1943.

=== First war patrol ===
Ro-36 got underway from Truk on 24 September 1943 to begin her first war patrol, assigned a patrol area in the New Hebrides. Off the New Hebrides on 13 October 1943, she attacked a lone Allied merchant ship but scored no hits, and the ship escaped. That same day, 40 members of her crew became ill with food poisoning, so she received orders on 14 October 1943 to return to Truk, which she reached on 21 October 1943. While at Truk, she was reassigned to Submarine Division 34 on 31 October 1943.

=== Second war patrol ===
During early December 1943, Ro-36 took aboard torpedoes and supplies from the auxiliary submarine tender Heian Maru at Truk, and on 8 December 1943 she put to sea for her second war patrol with orders to conduct a reconnaissance of Espiritu Santo in the New Hebrides. The patrol was uneventful, and after a month at sea she returned to Truk on 8 January 1944.

=== Operation Hailstone ===
During Ro-36′s stay at Truk, United States Navy Task Force 58 conducted Operation Hailstone, a major attack on Truk by carrier aircraft supported by anti-shipping sweeps around the atoll by surface warships, on 17 and 18 February 1944. Ro-36 and the submarines I-10 and Ro-42 put to sea on 17 February in an attempt to intercept the attacking ships. Ro-36 was unsuccessful, and returned to Truk on 19 February 1944.

=== Third war patrol ===
After again receiving torpedoes and stores from Heian Maru, Ro-36 got underway from Truk to begin her third war patrol on 25 February 1944, assigned a patrol area in the Marshall Islands. On 1 March 1944, she received orders to conduct a reconnaissance of Roi in the northern portion of Kwajalein Atoll. She surfaced off Roi on 4 March 1944, but did not make contact with any Allied forces. On 16 March 1944, she was ordered to operate in an area 60 nautical miles (110 km; 69 mi) east of Kwajalein and then proceed to Pingelap, where she was to rescue Japanese coastwatchers stranded there after the U.S. capture of Kwajalein Atoll, Roi-Namur, and Majuro. She embarked the coastwatchers at Pingelap on 23 March 1944 and set course for Truk, which she reached on 28 March 1944.

=== April–June 1944 ===
On 15 April 1944, Ro-36 departed Truk bound for Maizuru, where she arrived on 26 April 1944 to undergo an overhaul. After its completion, she got underway from Maizuru on 4 June 1944, stopped at Saeki, and then headed for Saipan in the Mariana Islands.

=== Fourth war patrol ===
Ro-36 departed Saipan on 11 June 1944 to make a supply run to Wewak, New Guinea, to support Japanese forces fighting in the New Guinea campaign, and conduct her fourth war patrol in the waters north of New Guinea. On 13 June 1944, however, the commander-in-chief of the Combined Fleet, Admiral Soemu Toyoda, activated Operation A-Go for the defense of the Mariana Islands and ordered the commander-in-chief of the 6th Fleet, Vice Admiral Takeo Takagi, to redeploy all 6th Fleet submarines to the Marianas. Takagi, in turn, ordered all available submarines to deploy east of the Marianas. That day, Ro-36 and the submarine Ro-43 were reassigned to Submarine Squadron 7 and ordered to move to the Saipan area, and Ro-36 sent a routine situation and weather report to the commander of Submarine Squadron 7. The Japanese never heard from her again.

=== Loss ===
Late on the evening of 13 June 1944, the destroyer USS Melvin (DD-680) was escorting battleships heading for Saipan to bombard the island when she detected a surfaced submarine on radar 75 nautical miles (139 km; 86 mi) east of Saipan. Melvin opened fire on the submarine with her 5-inch (127 mm) guns. The submarine submerged, and toward midnight Melvin sank it with depth charges at 15°21′N 147°00′E.

The submarine Melvin sank probably was Ro-36. On 12 July 1944, the Imperial Japanese Navy declared her to be presumed lost north of New Guinea with all 77 hands. She was stricken from the Navy list on 10 August 1944.
