= Japanese submarine Ro-47 =

Kaichū-type submarine

History

Japan
- Name: Submarine No. 388
- Builder: Mitsui Zosensho, Tamano, Japan
- Laid down: 28 December 1942
- Launched: 30 August 1943
- Renamed: Ro-47 on 30 August 1943
- Completed: 31 January 1944
- Commissioned: 31 January 1944
- Fate: Sunk 26 September 1944
- Stricken: 10 March 1945

General characteristics
- Class & type: Kaichū type submarine (K6 subclass)
- Displacement: 1,133 tonnes (1,115 long tons) surfaced; 1,470 tonnes (1,447 long tons) submerged
- Length: 80.5 m (264 ft 1 in) overall
- Beam: 7 m (23 ft 0 in)
- Draft: 4.07 m (13 ft 4 in)
- Installed power: 4,200 bhp (3,100 kW) (diesel); 1,200 hp (890 kW) (electric motor)
- Propulsion: Diesel-electric; 1 × diesel engine; 1 × electric motor
- Speed: 19.75 knots (36.58 km/h; 22.73 mph) surfaced; 8 knots (15 km/h; 9.2 mph) submerged
- Range: 5,000 nmi (9,300 km; 5,800 mi) at 16 knots (30 km/h; 18 mph) surfaced; 45 nmi (83 km; 52 mi) at 5 knots (9.3 km/h; 5.8 mph) submerged
- Test depth: 80 m (260 ft)
- Crew: 61
- Armament: 4 × bow 533 mm (21 in) torpedo tubes; 1 × 76.2 mm (3.00 in) L/40 anti-aircraft gun; 2 × single 25 mm (1.0 in) AA guns

Ro-47 was an Imperial Japanese Navy Kaichū type submarine of the K6 sub-class. Completed and commissioned in January 1944, she served in World War II in operations related to the Mariana and Palau Islands campaign. She was sunk in September 1944 during her second war patrol.

== Design and description ==
The submarines of the K6 sub-class were versions of the preceding K5 sub-class with greater range and diving depth. They displaced 1,133 tonnes (1,115 long tons) surfaced and 1,470 tonnes (1,447 long tons) submerged. The submarines were 80.5 meters (264 ft 1 in) long, had a beam of 7 meters (23 ft 0 in) and a draft of 4.07 meters (13 ft 4 in). They had a diving depth of 80 meters (260 ft).

For surface running, the boats were powered by two 2,100-brake-horsepower (1,566 kW) diesel engines, each driving one propeller shaft. When submerged each propeller was driven by a 600-horsepower (447 kW) electric motor. They could reach 19.75 knots (36.58 km/h; 22.73 mph) on the surface and 8 knots (15 km/h; 9.2 mph) underwater. On the surface, the K6s had a range of 11,000 nautical miles (20,000 km; 13,000 mi) at 12 knots (22 km/h; 14 mph); submerged, they had a range of 45 nmi (83 km; 52 mi) at 5 knots (9.3 km/h; 5.8 mph).

The boats were armed with four internal bow 53.3 cm (21.0 in) torpedo tubes and carried a total of ten torpedoes. They were also armed with a single 76.2 mm (3.00 in) L/40 anti-aircraft gun and two single 25 mm (1.0 in) AA guns.

== Construction and commissioning ==
Ro-47 was laid down as Submarine No. 388 on 28 December 1942 by Mitsui Zosensho at Tamano, Japan. She was launched on 30 August 1943, and was renamed Ro-47 that day. She was completed and commissioned on 31 January 1944.

== Service history ==
=== January–May 1944 ===
Upon commissioning, Ro-47 was attached to the Maizuru Naval District. After Japanese forces sighted an Allied task force heading toward the Palau Islands, Ro-47 and the submarines I-44, I-183, Ro-116, and Ro-117 received orders on 27 March 1944 to proceed to patrol areas east of the Palaus. Ro-47 got underway from Kure, Japan, that day, called at Tokuyama to refuel from 28 to 29 March 1944, and set out for her patrol area. On 5 April 1944 she was recalled to Kure, which she reached on 13 April 1944. She was reassigned to Submarine Division 34 in the 6th Fleet on 14 May 1944.

=== First war patrol ===
On 13 June 1944 the Combined Fleet activated Operation A-Go for the defense of the Mariana Islands, and that day the commander-in-chief of the 6th Fleet, Vice Admiral Takeo Takagi, ordered all available Japanese submarines to deploy east of the Marianas. Accordingly, Ro-47 departed Yokosuka, Japan, to begin her first war patrol, assigned a patrol area in the Marianas off Saipan, where the Battle of Saipan began with U.S. landings on the island on 15 June 1944. In July 1944, the 6th Fleet ordered most of its submarines, including Ro-47, to withdraw from the Marianas. Ro-47 departed her patrol area on 10 July 1944 and on 16 July arrived at Maizuru, where she began repairs and an overhaul. She later moved to Kure.

=== Second war patrol ===
On 15 September 1944, U.S. forces invaded the Palau Islands, landing on Angaur and on Peleliu. Ro-47 got underway from Kure on 17 September 1944 with orders to attack the U.S. invasion fleet off Peleliu, assigned a patrol area south of the Palaus. On 24 September 1944, she received an order to proceed at full speed to a new patrol area in the Philippine Sea east of the Palaus. The Japanese never heard from her again.

=== Loss ===
The United States Navy destroyer escort USS McCoy Reynolds (DE-440) was steaming independently in the Philippine Sea northeast of the Palaus on a voyage from Peleliu to Guam when at 01:03 on 26 September 1944 she detected a vessel on the surface on radar at a range of 9,200 yards (8,400 m). When she closed with it and challenged it, it disappeared from radar, indicating a diving submarine. McCoy Reynolds then detected the submarine on sonar at a range of 2,500 yards (2,300 m). At 02:18, McCoy Reynolds launched the first of six Hedgehog barrages. After the sixth attack, the crew of McCoy Reynolds felt a large underwater explosion at 06:15 and subsequently observed oil and debris rising to the surface, marking the sinking of a Japanese submarine at 09°19′N 136°44′E.

The submarine McCoy Reynolds sank probably was Ro-47. On 2 November 1944, the Imperial Japanese Navy declared Ro-47 to be presumed lost off the Palau Islands with all 76 men on board. She was stricken from the Navy list on 10 March 1945.
