= Japanese submarine Ro-56 (1944) =

Kaichū-type submarine

History

Japan
- Name: Ro-75
- Builder: Mitsui Zosensho, Tamano, Japan
- Laid down: 2 December 1943
- Renamed: Ro-56
- Launched: 5 July 1944
- Completed: 15 November 1944
- Commissioned: 15 November 1944
- Fate: Sunk 9 April 1945
- Stricken: 25 May 1945

General characteristics
- Class & type: Kaichū type submarine (K6 subclass)
- Displacement: 1,133 tonnes (1,115 long tons) surfaced; 1,470 tonnes (1,447 long tons) submerged
- Length: 80.5 m (264 ft 1 in) overall
- Beam: 7 m (23 ft 0 in)
- Draft: 4.07 m (13 ft 4 in)
- Installed power: 4,200 bhp (3,100 kW) (diesel); 1,200 hp (890 kW) (electric motor)
- Propulsion: Diesel-electric; 1 × diesel engine; 1 × electric motor
- Speed: 19.75 knots (36.58 km/h; 22.73 mph) surfaced; 8 knots (15 km/h; 9.2 mph) submerged
- Range: 5,000 nmi (9,300 km; 5,800 mi) at 16 knots (30 km/h; 18 mph) surfaced; 45 nmi (83 km; 52 mi) at 5 knots (9.3 km/h; 5.8 mph) submerged
- Test depth: 80 m (260 ft)
- Crew: 61
- Armament: 4 × bow 533 mm (21 in) torpedo tubes; 1 × 76.2 mm (3.00 in) L/40 anti-aircraft gun; 2 × single 25 mm (1.0 in) AA guns

The second Ro-56 was an Imperial Japanese Navy Kaichū type submarine of the K6 sub-class. Completed and commissioned in November 1944, she served in World War II and was sunk during her first war patrol in April 1945.

== Design and description ==
The submarines of the K6 sub-class were versions of the preceding K5 sub-class with greater range and diving depth. They displaced 1,133 tonnes (1,115 long tons) surfaced and 1,470 tonnes (1,447 long tons) submerged. The submarines were 80.5 meters (264 ft 1 in) long, had a beam of 7 meters (23 ft 0 in) and a draft of 4.07 meters (13 ft 4 in). They had a diving depth of 80 meters (260 ft).

For surface running, the boats were powered by two 2,100-brake-horsepower (1,566 kW) diesel engines, each driving one propeller shaft. When submerged each propeller was driven by a 600-horsepower (447 kW) electric motor. They could reach 19.75 knots (36.58 km/h; 22.73 mph) on the surface and 8 knots (15 km/h; 9.2 mph) underwater. On the surface, the K6s had a range of 11,000 nautical miles (20,000 km; 13,000 mi) at 12 knots (22 km/h; 14 mph); submerged, they had a range of 45 nmi (83 km; 52 mi) at 5 knots (9.3 km/h; 5.8 mph).

The boats were armed with four internal bow 53.3 cm (21.0 in) torpedo tubes and carried a total of ten torpedoes. They were also armed with a single 76.2 mm (3.00 in) L/40 anti-aircraft gun and two single 25 mm (1.0 in) AA guns.

== Construction and commissioning ==
Submarine No. 645 was laid down on 2 December 1943 by Mitsui Zosensho at Tamano, Japan, with the provisional name Ro-75. She had been renamed Ro-56 — the second submarine of that name — by the time she was launched on 5 July 1944. She was completed and commissioned on 15 November 1944.

== Service history ==
Upon commissioning, Ro-56 was attached to the Maizuru Naval District and assigned to Submarine Squadron 11 for workups. She was reassigned to Submarine Division 34 in the 6th Fleet on 10 February 1945. She arrived at Saeki, Japan, on 16 March 1945.

=== First war patrol ===
On 18 March 1945, Ro-56 departed Saeki to begin her first war patrol, ordered to operate southwest of Kyushu along with the submarines I-8, Ro-41, and Ro-49. She reported on 22 March 1945 that she had reached her patrol area. While she was at sea, the Battle of Okinawa began with the U.S. landings on Okinawa on 1 April 1945.

=== Loss ===
On 9 April 1945, the United States Navy destroyers USS Monssen (DD-798) and USS Mertz (DD-691) were escorting the aircraft carriers of Task Force 58 45 nautical miles (83 km; 52 mi) west of Okinawa when Monssen detected a submerged submarine on sonar at a range of 900 yards (820 m). Monssen dropped three patterns of depth charges, after which Mertz joined the attack and dropped another three patterns. Monssen then made two more depth-charge attacks, sinking the submarine at 26°09′N 130°21′E.

The submarine Monssen and Mertz sank probably was Ro-56. On 15 April 1945, the Imperial Japanese Navy declared her to be presumed lost off Okinawa with all 79 men on board. The Japanese struck her from the Navy list on 25 May 1945.

Some accounts claim that the U.S. submarine USS Sea Owl (SS-405) sank Ro-56 northeast of Wake Island on 18 April 1945, but Ro-56 never operated near Wake. The submarine Sea Owl attacked was I-372 — and I-372 survived the attack.
