= Japanese submarine I-184 =

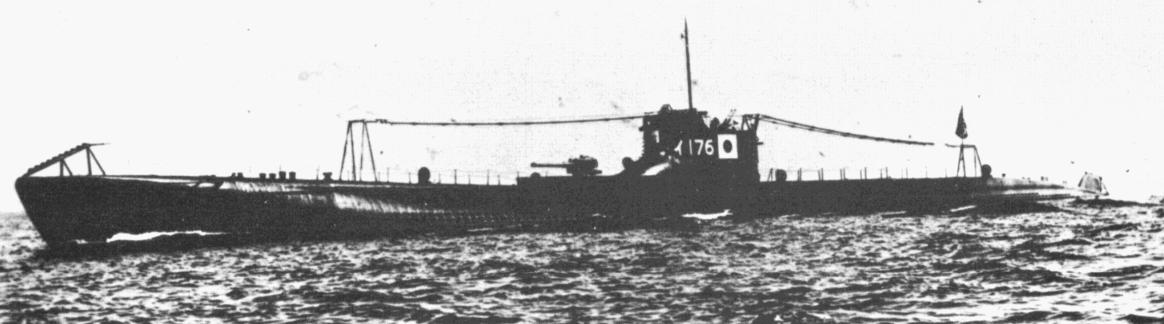
- Sister ship I-176 at sea, 1942

History

Empire of Japan
- Name: Submarine No. 162
- Builder: Yokosuka Naval Arsenal, Yokosuka, Japan
- Laid down: 1 April 1942
- Renamed: I-84 on unknown date; I-184 on 20 May 1942
- Launched: 12 December 1942
- Completed: 15 October 1943
- Fate: Sunk 19 June 1944
- Stricken: 10 August 1944

General characteristics
- Class & type: Kaidai type, KD7-class
- Displacement: 1,862 t (1,833 long tons) surfaced; 2,644 t (2,602 long tons) submerged
- Length: 105.5 m (346 ft 2 in)
- Beam: 8.25 m (27 ft 1 in)
- Draft: 4.6 m (15 ft 1 in)
- Installed power: 8,000 bhp (5,966 kW) (diesel engines); 1,800 hp (1,342 kW) (electric motors)
- Propulsion: Diesel-electric; 2 × diesel engines; 2 × electric motors
- Speed: 23 knots (43 km/h; 26 mph) surfaced; 8 knots (15 km/h; 9.2 mph) submerged
- Range: 8,000 nmi (15,000 km; 9,200 mi) at 16 knots (30 km/h; 18 mph) surfaced; 50 nmi (93 km; 58 mi) at 5 knots (9.3 km/h; 5.8 mph) submerged
- Test depth: 80 m (262 ft)
- Complement: 86
- Armament: 6 × 533 mm (21 in) torpedo tubes (all bow); 1 × 120 mm (4.7 in) deck gun; 1 × twin 25 mm (1.0 in) Type 96 AA gun

I-184 (originally I-84) was an Imperial Japanese Navy Kaidai type cruiser submarine of the KD7 sub-class commissioned in 1943. During World War II, she operated in the Aleutian Islands and the Central Pacific Ocean before she was sunk with all hands by a United States Navy torpedo bomber during the Battle of the Philippine Sea in June 1944.

== Design and description ==
The submarines of the KD7 sub-class were medium-range attack submarines developed from the preceding KD6 sub-class. They displaced 1,862 metric tons (1,833 long tons) surfaced and 2,644 metric tons (2,602 long tons) submerged. The submarines were 105.5 meters (346 ft 2 in) long and had a beam of 8.25 meters (27 ft 1 in) and a draft of 4.6 meters (15 ft 1 in). They had a diving depth of 80 m (262 ft) and a complement of 86 officers and crewmen.

For surface running, the submarines were powered by two 4,000-brake-horsepower (2,983 kW) diesel engines, each driving one propeller shaft. When submerged, each propeller was driven by a 900-horsepower (671 kW) electric motor. The submarines could reach 23 knots (43 km/h; 26 mph) on the surface and 8 knots (15 km/h; 9.2 mph) underwater. On the surface, the KD7s had a range of 8,000 nautical miles (15,000 km; 9,200 mi) at 16 knots (30 km/h; 18 mph); submerged, they had a range of 50 nmi (93 km; 58 mi) at 5 knots (9.3 km/h; 5.8 mph).

The submarines were armed with six internal 53.3 cm (21.0 in) torpedo tubes, all in the bow. They carried one reload for each tube for a total of 12 torpedoes. They were originally intended to be armed with two twin-gun mounts for the 25 mm (1.0 in) Type 96 anti-aircraft gun, but a 120 mm (4.7 in) deck gun for combat on the surface was substituted for one 25 mm mount during construction.

== Construction and commissioning ==
I-184 was laid down by the Yokosuka Naval Arsenal at Yokosuka, Japan, as Submarine No. 162 on 1 April 1942. She soon was named I-84, then was renamed I-184 on 20 May 1942. She was launched on 12 December 1942 and completed and commissioned on 15 October 1943.

== Service history ==
=== October 1943–January 1944 ===
On the day of her commissioning, I-184 was attached to the Sasebo Naval District and assigned to Submarine Squadron 11 in the 1st Fleet, an element of the Combined Fleet. Submarine Squadron 11 was reassigned to the 6th Fleet, another element of the Combined Fleet, on 25 November 1943. In late November 1943, I-184 took part in antisubmarine warfare exercises in the Iyo Nada in the Seto Inland Sea with the submarine tender Chōgei and the submarines I-42, I-43, Ro-40, and Ro-113.

On 28 January 1944, I-184 got underway from Kure, Japan, to test-launch the new Mark 1 naval mine. She was reassigned to Submarine Squadron 22 in the 6th Fleet on 31 January 1944.

=== Aleutian Islands ===
On 25 February 1944, I-184 received a temporary assignment to the Northeast Area Unit for duty in northern waters. She departed Sasebo, Japan, on 26 February 1944, visited Ōminato in northern Honshu from 29 February to 4 March 1944, and made an overnight stop at Paramushiro in the northern Kuril Islands from 11 to 12 March 1944 before beginning a war patrol in the waters of the Aleutian Islands. After an uneventful patrol, she called at Ōminato from 9 to 11 April 1944 before proceeding to Yokosuka, which she reached on 13 April 1944.

=== Central Pacific ===
I-184 departed Yokosuka on 20 May 1944 to carry food and supplies to the starving Japanese garrison on Mili Atoll in the Marshall Islands. She arrived at Mili on 12 June 1944, unloaded her cargo, and got back underway the same day.

On 13 June 1944, amid indications of an imminent American invasion of the Mariana Islands, the commander-in-chief of the Combined Fleet, Admiral Soemu Toyoda, activated Operation A-Go for the defense of the Marianas. The same day, the commander of the 6th Fleet, Vice Admiral Takeo Takagi, ordered all submarines under his command to deploy in the central Pacific Ocean east of Marianas as part of the defense. I-184′s specific orders called for her to take up a patrol station in between those assigned to the submarines I-5 and I-185.

The Marianas campaign began with American amphibious landings on Saipan on 15 June 1944. With the Battle of Saipan underway, Takagi′s ability to command the 6th Fleet from the fleet's headquarters on Saipan was disrupted, and command of the fleet passed to the commander of Submarine Squadron 7, Rear Admiral Noboru Owada, at Truk Atoll in the Caroline Islands. On 15 June, Owada ordered I-184 to proceed to Saipan. That day, I-184 acknowledged the order and reported her estimated time of arrival at Saipan as 00:22 Japan Standard Time on 18 June. The Japanese never heard from her again.

=== Loss ===
The Battle of the Philippine Sea began on 19 June 1944 as Japanese naval forces moved to attack the American landing force at Saipan and the United States Fifth Fleet engaged the approaching Japanese. A U.S. Navy TBM-1C Avenger torpedo bomber of Torpedo Squadron 60 (VT-60) flying an antisubmarine patrol from the escort aircraft carrier USS Suwanee (CVE-27) dropped below the cloud cover 20 nautical miles (37 km; 23 mi) southeast of Saipan on 19 June and sighted I-184 on the surface. As I-184 crash-dived, the Avenger′s pilot dropped depth charges just ahead of her track, sinking her at 13°01′N 149°53′E. There were no survivors.

On 12 July 1944, the Imperial Japanese Navy declared I-184 to be presumed lost with all 96 hands in the vicinity of Saipan. The Japanese struck her from the Navy List on 10 August 1944.
