= Ro-115 =

Ro-115 may refer to:

- Japanese submarine Ro-115, an Imperial Japanese Navy submarine commissioned in 1943 and sunk in 1945
- RO-115 Mark I, an Egyptian version of the T-62 tank
