= Ro-43 =

Ro-43 may refer to:

- IMAM Ro.43, an Italian reconnaissance seaplane of 1935–1943
- Japanese submarine Ro-43, an Imperial Japanese Navy submarine commissioned in 1943 and sunk in 1945
