= USS McCoy Reynolds =

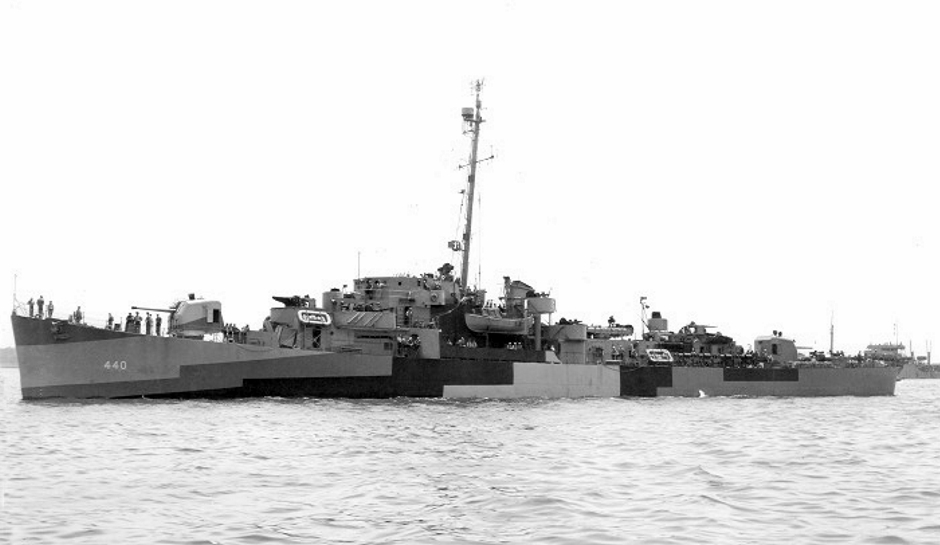
- USS McCoy Reynolds (DE-440), July 1944, location unknown.

History

United States
- Name: McCoy Reynolds
- Namesake: Private McCoy Reynolds (1916–1942)
- Builder: Federal Shipbuilding and Dry Dock Company, Newark, New Jersey
- Laid down: 18 November 1943
- Launched: 22 February 1944
- Sponsored by: Mrs. Tilden Reynolds
- Commissioned: 2 May 1944
- Decommissioned: 31 May 1946
- Recommissioned: 28 March 1951
- Decommissioned: 7 February 1957
- Fate: Loaned to Portugal 7 February 1957
- Stricken: 1 November 1968
- Identification: Hull symbol:DE-440; Code letters:NHXK
- Fate: Sold to Portugal December 1968

Portugal
- Name: Corte Real
- Acquired: 7 February 1957 (on loan); December 1968 (purchased outright)
- Decommissioned: 19 November 1968
- Fate: Scrapped 1970

General characteristics
- Class & type: John C. Butler-class destroyer escort
- Displacement: 1,350 long tons (1,372 t) (standard); 1,745 long tons (1,773 t) (full load)
- Length: 306 ft (93 m) (oa)
- Beam: 36 ft 10 in (11.23 m)
- Draft: 13 ft 4 in (4.06 m) (max)
- Installed power: 2 × boilers; 12,000 shp (8,900 kW)
- Propulsion: 2 × geared steam turbines; 2 × screws
- Speed: 24 kn (28 mph; 44 km/h)
- Range: 6,000 nmi at 12 kn (14 mph; 22 km/h)
- Complement: 14 officers, 201 enlisted
- Armament: 2 × 5 in (130 mm)/38 caliber guns; 4 × 40 mm (1.6 in) Bofors guns (2x2); 10 × 20 mm (0.79 in) Oerlikon cannons; 3 × 21 inch (533 mm) Torpedo tubes; 1 × Hedgehog, 8 × Mk6 depth charge projectors; 2 × Mk9 stern depth charge tracks

USS McCoy Reynolds (DE-440) was a John C. Butler-class destroyer escort acquired by the U.S. Navy during World War II. The primary purpose of the destroyer escort was to escort and protect ships in convoy, in addition to other tasks as assigned, such as patrol or radar picket. Post-war, after operating in the Pacific Ocean battle areas, her crew members returned home with four battle stars to their credit for World War II and one for the Korean War.

The ship was named in honor of Marine Private McCoy Reynolds (1916–1942), who was killed in action on Guadalcanal on 25 November 1942, after exposing himself to destroy a Japanese machine gun nest in the defense of Henderson Field, for which he was posthumously awarded the Silver Star.

== Construction and commissioning ==
McCoy Reynolds (DE 440) was laid down by Federal Shipbuilding & Dry Dock Co., Newark, New Jersey, 18 November 1943; launched 22 February 1944; sponsored by Mrs. Tilden Reynolds; and commissioned at Brooklyn Navy Yard 2 May 1944.

== World War II Pacific Theater operations ==
After shakedown off Bermuda, McCoy Reynolds departed Norfolk, Virginia, 11 July to escort the aircraft carrier USS Ranger (CV-4) to the Panama Canal Zone. arriving 16 July. She transited the Panama Canal on 26 July: reached San Diego, California, 6 August; and, between 13 and 19 August, screened transports and supply ships to the Hawaiian Islands.

=== Sinking of Japanese submarine Ro-47 ===
Sailing 3 September, McCoy Reynolds escorted ships via the Admiralty Islands to the Palau Islands. From 20 to 24 September she screened shore bombardment ships aiding the conquest of Peleliu by U.S. Marines. On 25 September, en route to join Task Force 57 out of Guam, McCoy Reynolds made underwater contact with a suspected submarine, and for 2 hours launched four depth charge attacks without results. At 0203 26 September, she picked up a contact on surface radar at about 9,000 yards (8,230 meters). Five minutes later it disappeared; however, at 0213 her sonar regained contact at a range of 2,500. At 0219 she launched the first of seven vigorous, intensive attacks with hedgehogs and depth charges on the target, probably submarine Ro-47. Four hours later, a violent underwater explosion was felt, and her lookouts spotted an oil slick which by noon covered an area of 2 square miles (5.2 km^{2}).

=== Sinking of Japanese submarine I-37 ===
Arriving Guam 28 September, McCoy Reynolds served on convoy and escort duty; 25 and 26 October she screened ships of task group TG 30.8 east of Luzon as they refueled hard-hitting carriers of the Fast Carrier Task Force. She escorted two merchant troopships, to Leyte Gulf 11 to 14 November, sailed in convoy 15 November, and arrived at Kossol, Palaus, the 18th. With the destroyer escort USS Conklin (DE-439), she began a sonar search at 1055 on 19 November for a submarine that had been spotted in the western entrance to Kossol Roads. Four hours later she made contact and closed to attack with hedgehogs and depth charges. McCoy Reynolds and Conklin made a total of eight attacks until an underwater explosion occurred and oil and debris gushed to the surface at about 1745, marking the sinking of the Japanese submarine I-37.

=== Guarding against air attack ===
Through March 1945, McCoy Reynolds escorted convoys in the Marianas and Marshalls and conducted antisubmarine patrols out of Ulithi and Manus. She departed Ulithi 26 March to screen the Logistics Support Group of the United States Fifth Fleet's Fast Carrier Task Force during the Okinawa campaign. During her third escort mission on 12 May McCoy Reynolds went to the aid of the aircraft carrier USS Bunker Hill (CV-17), struck by two kamikazes the day before, with heavy losses and serious damage. McCoy Reynolds guarded the carrier to Ulithi, arriving 14 May, then returned to the Logistics Support Group, with whom she experienced the typhoon of 5 June which severely damaged more than 20 ships of the fleet.

=== Capture and rescue operations ===
After a convoy run to and from Ulithi, McCoy Reynolds carried out antisubmarine and antiair patrols off Okinawa during the closing weeks of the Pacific War. On 12 July she captured two enemy soldiers attempting to escape from the island in a dugout canoe. On 9 September she rescued two survivors of a U.S. Army fighter which had flamed out off Hagushi. She made passenger, freight, and mail runs from Okinawa to Nagasaki and Sasebo until 15 October when she sailed for Saipan, Pearl Harbor, and San Diego, California.

Arriving San Diego 5 November, she decommissioned there 31 May 1946 and entered the Pacific Reserve Fleet.

== Reactivation for Korean War ==
McCoy Reynolds recommissioned on 29 March 1951. Following shakedown, she departed San Diego 8 July and arrived Pearl Harbor the 14th. She operated out of Pearl Harbor until 3 May 1952 when she deployed for the Far East.

Sailing via Midway Island and Yokosuka, Japan, she arrived off the eastern coast of Korea 17 May. The next day she began shore bombardment at Songjin, and on 21 May she destroyed a North Korean railroad train. She alternated duty off Korea with escort runs and UDT delivery and support from Japan to Okinawa and with Formosa patrol duty until departing 20 August for Pearl Harbor, arriving the 29th.

== Operations with Royal Thai Navy ==
McCoy Reynolds operated out of Pearl Harbor during the next 16 months and deployed to the Far East 4 January 1954. She reached Manila Bay 18 January and after exercises with the Royal Thai Navy carried out training operations in the South China Sea. After serving as station ship at Hong Kong 20 March to 12 May, she exercised in the South China Sea and Gulf of Siam until making passage to Pearl Harbor, 29 June to 11 July.

McCoy Reynolds sailed 31 May 1955 for surveillance patrols off the Carolines and service as a search and rescue ship in the mid Pacific, returning to Pearl Harbor 22 October. She participated in antisubmarine warfare, escort, and (other training until sailing for the United States West Coast 24 August 1956.

== Final decommissioning ==
She arrived San Francisco, California, 31 August, underwent overhaul at Hunter's Point and decommissioned at Treasure Island, California, 7 February 1957. She was stricken from the U.S. Naval Vessel Register on 1 November 1968.

== Awards ==
McCoy Reynolds received four battle stars for World War II service and one battle star for Korean War.

== Portuguese Navy ==
Under the Military Assistance Program, the ship was loaned to the Government of Portugal on 7 February 1957, and she entered service in the Portuguese Navy as Corte Real (F 334) and served until decommissioned on 19 November 1968. The United States sold her to Portugal outright in December 1968, and she was scrapped in 1970.
