= Japanese submarine Ro-41 =

Kaichū-type submarine

History

Japan
- Name: Submarine No. 207
- Builder: Mitsubishi, Kobe, Japan
- Laid down: 6 October 1942
- Launched: 5 May 1943
- Renamed: Ro-41 on 5 May 1943
- Completed: 26 November 1943
- Commissioned: 26 November 1943
- Fate: Sunk 23 March 1945
- Stricken: 25 May 1945

General characteristics
- Class & type: Kaichū type submarine (K6 subclass)
- Displacement: 1,133 tonnes (1,115 long tons) surfaced; 1,470 tonnes (1,447 long tons) submerged
- Length: 80.5 m (264 ft 1 in) overall
- Beam: 7 m (23 ft 0 in)
- Draft: 4.07 m (13 ft 4 in)
- Installed power: 4,200 bhp (3,100 kW) (diesel); 1,200 hp (890 kW) (electric motor)
- Propulsion: Diesel-electric; 1 × diesel engine; 1 × electric motor
- Speed: 19.75 knots (36.58 km/h; 22.73 mph) surfaced; 8 knots (15 km/h; 9.2 mph) submerged
- Range: 5,000 nmi (9,300 km; 5,800 mi) at 16 knots (30 km/h; 18 mph) surfaced; 45 nmi (83 km; 52 mi) at 5 knots (9.3 km/h; 5.8 mph) submerged
- Test depth: 80 m (260 ft)
- Crew: 61
- Armament: 4 × bow 533 mm (21 in) torpedo tubes; 1 × 76.2 mm (3.00 in) L/40 dual-purpose gun; 2 × single 25 mm (1.0 in) AA guns

Ro-41 was an Imperial Japanese Navy Kaichū type submarine of the K6 sub-class. Completed and commissioned in November 1943, she served in World War II and conducted six war patrols, sinking a destroyer escort USS Shelton (DE-407) on one of them, before she was sunk in March 1945.

== Design and description ==
The submarines of the K6 sub-class were versions of the preceding K5 sub-class with greater range and diving depth. They displaced 1,133 tonnes (1,115 long tons) surfaced and 1,470 tonnes (1,447 long tons) submerged. The submarines were 80.5 meters (264 ft 1 in) long, had a beam of 7 meters (23 ft 0 in) and a draft of 4.07 meters (13 ft 4 in). They had a diving depth of 80 meters (260 ft).

For surface running, the boats were powered by two 2,100-brake-horsepower (1,566 kW) diesel engines, each driving one propeller shaft. When submerged each propeller was driven by a 600-horsepower (447 kW) electric motor. They could reach 19.75 knots (36.58 km/h; 22.73 mph) on the surface and 8 knots (15 km/h; 9.2 mph) underwater. On the surface, the K6s had a range of 11,000 nautical miles (20,000 km; 13,000 mi) at 12 knots (22 km/h; 14 mph); submerged, they had a range of 45 nmi (83 km; 52 mi) at 5 knots (9.3 km/h; 5.8 mph).

The boats were armed with four internal bow 53.3 cm (21.0 in) torpedo tubes and carried a total of ten torpedoes. They were also armed with a single 76.2 mm (3.00 in) L/40 anti-aircraft gun and two single 25 mm (1.0 in) AA guns.

== Construction and commissioning ==
Ro-41 was laid down on 6 October 1942 by Mitsubishi at Kobe, Japan, with the name Submarine No. 207. She was launched on 5 May 1943 and was renamed Ro-41 that day. She was completed and commissioned on 26 November 1943.

== Service history ==
Upon commissioning, Ro-41 was attached to the Maizuru Naval District and assigned to Submarine Squadron 11 for workups. On 5 March 1944, she was reassigned to Submarine Division 34 in the 6th Fleet. She departed Kure, Japan, that day bound for Truk, which she reached on 14 March 1944.

=== First war patrol ===
Ro-41 got underway from Truk on 17 March 1944 to begin her first war patrol, ordered to intercept the battleships of United States Navy Task Group 50.10, which the submarine Ro-42 had sighted. Ro-41 patrolled southeast of Truk, but did not find any enemy ships. On 23 March 1944, she received orders to move to a new patrol area east of Jaluit Atoll. While returning to Truk on 18 April 1944, she and the submarines Ro-106 and Ro-115 were ordered to intercept an Allied task force Japanese forces had sighted south of Truk, but she was ordered back to Truk on 19 April 1944 before she found any Allied ships.

=== Second war patrol ===
Ro-41 began her second war patrol on 23 April 1944, departing Truk to head for a patrol area north of Hollandia, New Guinea. On 26 April 1944, she was reassigned to Submarine Group B and ordered to move to the vicinity of Mereyon Island at Woleai in the Caroline Islands to intercept an Allied task force. She found no Allied ships, and departed her patrol area on 2 May 1944. After calling at Saipan from 7 to 10 May 1944, she headed for Truk, which she reached on 13 May 1944.

=== Kusaie supply run ===
U.S. Navy forces received Ultra intelligence information that Ro-41 would depart Truk at 13:00 on 24 May 1944 to make a supply run to Kusaie, where she was scheduled to arrive on 28 May 1944 at 16:30. The destroyer USS Eaton (DD-510) got underway from the anchorage at Jaluit Atoll to intercept Ro-41. The destroyer escorts USS Greiner (DE-37) and USS Sanders (DE-40) later joined Eaton.

Ro-41 left Truk on 24 May 1944 as scheduled and set course for Kusaie with a cargo of 12 metric tons of rice. She arrived south of Kusaie on the morning of 30 May 1944 and approached the harbor at Utwa. After dark, she surfaced and contacted the Japanese garrison of Kusaie, but her lookouts soon reported the arrival of three American ships — presumably Eaton, Greiner, and Sanders — which they identified as a destroyer and two patrol boats. The U.S. ships appeared not to notice Ro-41, but when an Allied patrol plane also arrived on the scene, Ro-41 withdrew. The three American ships had left the area by around 17:00 Japan Standard Time, and Ro-41 entered the harbor at Utwa and began to unload her cargo, but after about 15 minutes the three ships appeared again. Ro-41′s crew also noted flights by Allied patrol aircraft, but the submarine went unnoticed and the Japanese managed to unload her cargo on 31 May 1944 during a lull in the flights. Ro-41′s commanding officer sent a message to Truk offering his opinion that the Allied activity surrounding Ro-41′s visit to Kusaie indicated that the Allies were decrypting and reading coded Japanese signals. In response the Japanese drastically reduced communications with the garrison on Kusaie, pending the issuance of new codes, and ordered the submarine I-5, which was headed to Kusaie, to divert to Ponape.

Meanwhile, Ro-41 departed Kusaie on 1 June 1944 and moved to a patrol area 10 nautical miles (19 km; 12 mi) west of Jaluit Atoll, and on 6 June 1944, the U.S. Navy destroyer escort USS Steele (DE-8) arrived off Kusaie in a belated attempt to intercept her there. Ro-41′s sound operator reported hearing the propeller noises of an Allied convoy west of Jaluit on 12 June 1944, but Ro-41 did not intercept the convoy.

=== Marianas campaign ===
On 13 June 1944 the Combined Fleet activated Operation A-Go for the defense of the Mariana Islands, and that day the commander of the 6th Fleet, Vice Admiral Takeo Takagi, ordered all available Japanese submarines, including Ro-41, to deploy east of the Marianas. The Marianas campaign began with the U.S. invasion of Saipan on 15 June 1944, and on 16 June the 6th Fleet ordered most of the submarines, again including Ro-41, to withdraw from the Marianas.

=== July–September 1944 ===
On 22 June 1944, Ro-41 received orders to return to Japan and rendezvous with the submarine tender Tsukushi Maru in the western Seto Inland Sea for repairs and provisions. After stopping in the western Seto Inland Sea on 4 July 1944, she continued on to Sasebo, which she reached on 5 July 1944. At Sasebo, she began repairs and an overhaul which probably included the installation of a Type 13 air-search radar and a Type 22 surface-search radar.

=== Third war patrol ===
On 15 September 1944, U.S. forces landed on Peleliu and on Angaur in the Palau Islands, and on 18 September, with her repairs and overhaul complete, Ro-41 got underway from Kure to begin her third war patrol, assigned a patrol area in the Palaus east of the Philippine Islands. On 24 September 1944, she received orders to move to the Morotai area. She was 35 nautical miles (65 km; 40 mi) east of Morotai on 3 October 1944 when at 08:07 she fired all four of her remaining torpedoes at the U.S. Navy escort aircraft carriers USS Midway (CVE-63) and USS Fanshaw Bay (CVE-70). Ro-41′s crew heard two explosions, and her commanding officer believed that she had sunk one of the carriers and damaged the other. In fact, her torpedoes missed both carriers, although one hit the destroyer escort USS Shelton (DE-407) in the stern.

Another destroyer escort, USS Richard M. Rowell (DE-403), depth-charged Ro-41, but Ro-41 escaped. Richard M. Rowell then took off Shelton′s crew. After an aircraft from Midway detected a submarine and dropped a bomb and a dye marker at its location, Richard M. Rowell attacked and sank the submarine with Hedgehog projectiles. It later became apparent that the submarine she mistakenly sank was USS Seawolf (SS-197). Shelton, meanwhile, was taken under tow, but capsized and sank at 02°32′N 129°13′E.

On 10 October 1944, two Kanoya-based Yokosuka D4Y Suisei ("Comet"; Allied reporting name "Judy") reconnaissance planes reported a U.S. force of three aircraft carriers and two destroyers southeast of Okinawa steaming northeast, which the Japanese believed to be part of U.S. Navy Task Force 38. Ro-41 and the submarines Ro-43 and Ro-46 were ordered to intercept the ships. Ro-41 did not find the carriers, and she returned to Kure on 14 October 1944. She erroneously received credit for sinking one aircraft carrier during her patrol.

=== Fourth war patrol ===
Ro-41 was reassigned to Submarine Group B on 18 October 1944. On 20 October, the Philippines campaign and the Battle of Leyte began when U.S. forces landed on Leyte in the Philippine Islands, and that day Ro-41 got underway from Kure to begin her fourth war patrol, bound for a patrol area in the Philippine Sea east of Samar. The Japanese naval reaction to the invasion resulted in the Battle of Leyte Gulf, which lasted from 23 to 26 October 1944, but she saw no action in the battle. She sighted a U.S. aircraft carrier escorted by several destroyers east of Samar on 27 October 1944. On 31 October 1944 she and the submarine Ro-43 received orders to patrol in the San Bernardino Strait between Luzon and Samar and report and attack any Allied forces attempting to interfere with Japanese convoys bringing supplies and reinforcements from Manila to Leyte, and she was east of Legaspi on 7 November 1944 when she made sound contact on a westbound Allied task force. Ordered back to Japan on 8 November 1944, she made sound contact on a westbound Allied convoy at 02:40 on 12 November before arriving at Maizuru on 18 November 1944.

=== Fifth war patrol ===
Ro-41 departed Tokuyama on 24 December 1944 for her fifth war patrol, assigned a patrol area northeast of the Philippine Islands. By 4 January 1945 she was operating west of Luzon. U.S. forces entered Lingayen Gulf and U.S. forces landed on Luzon on 9 January 1945, but Ro-41 did not engage any Allied forces during her patrol. She arrived at Kure on 31 January 1945.

=== Sixth war patrol ===
On 7 March 1945, Ro-41 arrived at Maizuru, then departed the same day bound for Kure. She got underway from Kure on 10 March 1945 to carry supplies to Truk, but on 13 March received orders to abort her supply run and return to Japan so that she could take part in an interception of U.S. Navy Task Force 58. After an overnight stay at Kure from 15 to 16 March 1945, she moved on to Saeki. On 18 March 1945, she departed Saeki as the first of a force of submarines that also included I-8, Ro-49, and Ro-56 with orders to attempt to intercept the damaged U.S. aircraft carrier USS Franklin (CV-13).

The U.S. Navy submarine USS Kete (SS-369) disappeared after transmitting a routine weather report south of Kyushu while proceeding east on 20 March 1945 while Ro-41 was in the area heading south, and some historians have credited Ro-41 with sinking Kete. Ro-41 never reported sinking, or even sighting, an enemy submarine, so it seems unlikely that she sank Kete.

On 22 March 1945, Ro-41 was 320 nautical miles (590 km; 370 mi) east of Okinawa when she transmitted a message reporting that she had sighted an enemy destroyer. The Japanese never heard from her again.

=== Loss ===
Later on 22 March 1945, the destroyer USS Haggard (DD-555) was operating as a picket 12 nautical miles (22 km; 14 mi) ahead of Task Force 58 when her radar detected a vessel on the surface at a range of 25,000 yards (22,900 m) at 23:42. She and the destroyer USS Uhlmann (DD-687) closed the range. The contact disappeared from radar, indicating a diving submarine, but Haggard detected it on sonar and attacked it with depth charges. Shortly before midnight, the submarine broached off Haggard′s port beam, and Haggard′s Bofors 40 mm guns opened fire on its conning tower. Haggard turned hard to port and rammed the submarine on its starboard side abaft its conning tower. On 23 March 1945, the submarine sank by the stern at 22°57′N 132°19′E shortly after midnight, leaving no survivors. Having suffered heavy bow damage while ramming the submarine, Haggard proceeded to the fleet anchorage at Ulithi Atoll for repairs, accompanied by Uhlmann.

The submarine Haggard sank probably was Ro-41. On 15 April 1945, the Imperial Japanese Navy declared her to be presumed lost in the Okinawa area with all 82 hands. She was stricken from the Navy list on 25 May 1945.
