= Japanese submarine Ro-113 =

1943 submarine

History

Japan
- Name: Submarine No. 404
- Builder: Kawasaki, Kobe, Japan
- Laid down: 11 July 1942
- Renamed: Ro-113 on 5 February 1943
- Launched: 24 April 1943
- Completed: 12 October 1943
- Commissioned: 12 October 1943
- Fate: Sunk, 13 February 1945
- Stricken: 10 May 1945

General characteristics
- Class & type: Ro-100-class submarine
- Displacement: 611 t (601 long tons) surfaced; 795 t (782 long tons) submerged
- Length: 60.90 m (199 ft 10 in) overall
- Beam: 6.00 m (19 ft 8 in)
- Draft: 3.51 m (11 ft 6 in)
- Installed power: 1,000 bhp (750 kW) (diesel); 760 hp (570 kW) (electric motor)
- Propulsion: Diesel-electric; 1 × diesel engine; 1 × electric motor
- Speed: 14.2 knots (26.3 km/h; 16.3 mph) surfaced; 8 knots (15 km/h; 9.2 mph) submerged
- Range: 3,500 nmi (6,500 km; 4,000 mi) at 12 knots (22 km/h; 14 mph) surfaced; 60 nmi (110 km; 69 mi) at 3 knots (5.6 km/h; 3.5 mph) submerged
- Test depth: 75 m (246 ft)
- Crew: 38
- Armament: 4 × bow 533 mm (21 in) torpedo tubes; 2 × 25 mm (1 in) Type 96 anti-aircraft guns or 1 × 76.2 mm (3.00 in) L/40 AA gun

Ro-113 was an Imperial Japanese Navy Ro-100-class submarine. Completed and commissioned in October 1943, she served in World War II, operating off the Admiralty Islands, in the Indian Ocean — where she sank the last Allied ship torpedoed by a Japanese submarine during World War II — and off the Philippine Islands. She was sunk in February 1945.

== Design and description ==
The Ro-100 class was a medium-sized, coastal submarine derived from the preceding Kaichū type. They displaced 611 tonnes (601 long tons) surfaced and 795 tonnes (782 long tons) submerged. The submarines were 60.9 meters (199 ft 10 in) long, had a beam of 6 meters (19 ft 8 in) and a draft of 3.51 meters (11 ft 6 in). They had a double hull and a diving depth of 75 meters (246 ft).

For surface running, the boats were powered by two 500-brake-horsepower (373 kW) diesel engines, each driving one propeller shaft. When submerged each propeller was driven by a 380-horsepower (283 kW) electric motor. They could reach 14.2 knots (26.3 km/h; 16.3 mph) on the surface and 8 knots (15 km/h; 9.2 mph) underwater. On the surface, the Ro-100s had a range of 3,500 nautical miles (6,500 km; 4,000 mi) at 12 knots (22 km/h; 14 mph); submerged, they had a range of 60 nmi (110 km; 69 mi) at 3 knots (5.6 km/h; 3.5 mph).

The boats were armed with four internal bow 53.3 cm (21.0 in) torpedo tubes and carried a total of eight torpedoes. They were also armed with two single mounts for 25 mm (1 in) Type 96 anti-aircraft guns or a single 76.2 mm (3.00 in) L/40 AA gun.

== Construction and commissioning ==
Ro-113 was laid down as Submarine No. 404 on 11 July 1942 by Kawasaki at Kobe, Japan. Renamed Ro-113 on 5 February 1943, she was launched on 24 April 1943. She was completed and commissioned on 12 October 1943.

== Service history ==
=== October 1943–May 1944 ===
Upon commissioning, Ro-113 was attached to the Kure Naval District and was assigned to Submarine Squadron 11 for workups. While conducting a simulated torpedo attack in the Seto Inland Sea on 9 November 1943, she collided with the battleship Yamashiro in the Iyo Nada, suffering minor damage and no casualties. She proceeded to Kure for inspection and repairs. In late November 1943, she took part in antisubmarine warfare exercises in the Iyo Nada in the Seto Inland Sea with the submarine tender Chōgei and the submarines I-42, I-43, I-184, and Ro-40. She resumed workups on 2 December 1943 and called at Tokuyama from 2 to 6 December 1943 to refuel.

On 31 January 1944, Ro-113 was reassigned to Submarine Division 30. She departed Kure, Japan, on 23 February 1944 for her first combat operation, an antisubmarine patrol in the Ryukyu Islands under the direction of the Grand Escort Command. She was reassigned to Submarine Division 51 in Submarine Squadron 7 in the 6th Fleet on 25 March 1944. On 21 May 1944 she departed Kure bound for Saipan in the Mariana Islands, which she reached on 29 May 1944.

=== First war patrol ===
On 8 June 1944, Ro-113 departed Saipan to begin her first war patrol, ordered to join a submarine patrol line north of New Ireland in the Bismarck Archipelago. She received orders on 14 June 1944 to move to a new patrol area north of Guam, and on 16 June 1944 she was reassigned to Patrol Unit C along with the submarines Ro-114, Ro-115, and Ro-117. Ordered on 22 June 1944 to return to base, she arrived at Truk on 27 June 1944.

=== July–August 1944 ===
On 10 July 1944, Ro-113 departed Truk bound for Sasebo, Japan, which she reached on 17 July 1944. On 15 August 1944, Submarine Division 51 was disbanded, and Ro-113 and Ro-115 were reassigned directly to Submarine Squadron 8 in the 6th Fleet. Ro-113 departed Kure on 7 September 1944 and headed for Penang in Japanese-occupied British Malaya, arriving there on 27 September 1944 for operations in the Indian Ocean.

=== Second war patrol ===
Ro-113 got underway from Penang on 25 October 1944 to begin her second war patrol, assigned a patrol area in the Bay of Bengal. On 6 November 1944 she torpedoed and sank the British 3,827-gross register ton merchant ship Marion Moller — the last Allied ship torpedoed by a Japanese submarine in the Indian Ocean — in the Bay of Bengal at 10°40′N 081°10′E. The Royal Navy destroyers HMS Quality, HMS Quadrant, and HMS Roebuck arrived on the scene a few hours later and began a pursuit of Ro-113. The British Task Force 66, centered round the escort aircraft carriers HMS Begum and HMS Shah, also became involved, but Ro-113 escaped and returned to Penang on 13 November 1944.

=== Third war patrol ===
Ro-113 began her third war patrol on 28 November 1944, again tasked with attacking Allied shipping in the Bay of Bengal. A Royal Air Force Liberator bomber attacked her in the Bay of Bengal off Madras, India, on 3 December 1944, but she survived undamaged. She reported sinking a transport on 18 December 1944 and a second transport on 19 December, but postwar analysis found no evidence of her having sunk any ships on these dates. Off Penang as Ro-113 was concluding her patrol, the Royal Navy submarine HMS Thule fired six torpedoes at her, all of which exploded prematurely, leading Thule's commanding officer to claim the sinking of Ro-113, but Ro-113 survived and reached Penang safely.

=== Fourth war patrol ===
Ro-113 began her fourth war patrol on 20 January 1945, departing Penang, pausing briefly at Singapore later in the day, and then heading for her patrol area in the South China Sea west of Luzon. On 4 February 1945, the 6th Fleet ordered Ro-113 and the submarines Ro-46, Ro-112, and Ro-115 to proceed to Takao, Formosa, unload their reserve torpedoes and deck gun ammunition there, and then head for Batulinao on the northern coast of Luzon to rescue Imperial Japanese Navy Air Service pilots stranded in Luzon's Aparri area and transport them to Takao. After calling at Takao from 7 to 9 February 1945, Ro-113 got back underway and set course for Batulinao.

=== Loss ===
Ro-113 was on the surface in the Luzon Strait in the vicinity of Babuyan Island north of Luzon in the predawn darkness of 13 February 1945 when the U.S. Navy submarine USS Batfish detected her on radar at 02:15 bearing 220 degrees from Batfish at a range of 10,700 yards (9,780 m). Batfish lost contact at 02:41 at a range of 7,150 yards (6,540 m) when Ro-113 submerged.

At 03:10, Ro-113 surfaced and Batfish's radar detector picked up her radar emissions. Batfish also detected her on radar at a range of 9,800 yards (9,000 m) bearing 336 degrees from Batfish. At 04:12, Batfish submerged to radar depth along Ro-113's track with Ro-113 6,800 yards (6,200 m) yards away and closing. At 04:48, Batfish fired three torpedoes from her stern torpedo tubes for a 1,500-yard (1,400 m) run to their target. At 04:49, the first torpedo hit Ro-113, creating a large yellow fireball and blowing her apart. Ro-113 sank with all hands at 19°10′N 121°23′E, going under so quickly that Batfish's second and third torpedoes missed.

On 20 February 1945, the Imperial Japanese Navy declared Ro-113 to be presumed lost in the Luzon Strait with all 59 men on board. The Japanese struck her from the Navy list on 10 May 1945.
