= Japanese submarine I-46 =

Type C cruiser submarine

- I-46 docked in Kure, 4 April 1944

History

Empire of Japan
- Name: Submarine No. 376
- Builder: Sasebo Naval Arsenal, Sasebo, Japan
- Laid down: 21 November 1942
- Renamed: I-46 on 25 May 1943
- Launched: 3 June 1943
- Completed: 29 February 1944
- Commissioned: 29 February 1944
- Fate: Missing October 1944 (see text)
- Stricken: 10 March 1945

General characteristics
- Class & type: Type C submarine
- Displacement: 2,595 tonnes (2,554 long tons) surfaced; 3,621 tonnes (3,564 long tons) submerged
- Length: 109.3 m (358 ft 7 in) overall
- Beam: 9.1 m (29 ft 10 in)
- Draft: 5.35 m (17 ft 7 in)
- Installed power: 12,400 bhp (9,200 kW) (diesel); 2,000 hp (1,500 kW) (electric motor)
- Propulsion: Diesel-electric; 1 × diesel engine, 751 tons fuel; 1 × electric motor
- Speed: 23.5 knots (43.5 km/h; 27.0 mph) surfaced; 8 knots (15 km/h; 9.2 mph) submerged
- Range: 14,000 nmi (26,000 km; 16,000 mi) at 16 knots (30 km/h; 18 mph) surfaced; 60 nmi (110 km; 69 mi) at 3 knots (5.6 km/h; 3.5 mph) submerged
- Test depth: 100 m (330 ft)
- Crew: 94
- Armament: 8 × bow 533 mm (21 in) torpedo tubes; 1 × 14 cm (5.5 in) deck gun; 2 × single or twin 25 mm (1 in) Type 96 anti-aircraft guns

I-46 (伊46) was the sixth Type C cruiser submarines built for the Imperial Japanese Navy. Commissioned in February 1944, she operated in World War II during the Battle of Leyte and Battle of Leyte Gulf before she was lost in October 1944. It is sometimes considered as part of a sub-class the Type C due to the various designs variations of the latter batch.

== Design and description ==
The Type C submarines were derived from the earlier Kaidai-type VI with a heavier torpedo armament for long-range attacks. They displaced 2,595 tonnes (2,554 long tons) surfaced and 3,618 tonnes (3,561 long tons) submerged. The submarines were 109.3 meters (358 ft 7 in) long, had a beam of 9.1 meters (29 ft 10 in) and a draft of 5.3 meters (17 ft 5 in). They had a diving depth of 100 meters (330 ft).

For surface running, the boats were powered by two 6,200-brake-horsepower (4,623 kW) diesel engines, each driving one propeller shaft. When submerged each propeller was driven by a 1,000-horsepower (746 kW) electric motor. They could reach 23.6 knots (43.7 km/h; 27.2 mph) on the surface and 8 knots (15 km/h; 9.2 mph) underwater. On the surface, the C1s had a range of 14,000 nautical miles (26,000 km; 16,000 mi) at 16 knots (30 km/h; 18 mph); submerged, they had a range of 60 nmi (110 km; 69 mi) at 3 knots (5.6 km/h; 3.5 mph).

The boats were armed with eight internal bow 53.3 cm (21.0 in) torpedo tubes and carried a total of 20 torpedoes. They were also armed with a single 140 mm (5.5 in)/40 deck gun and two single or twin mounts for 25 mm (1 in) Type 96 anti-aircraft guns. They were equipped to carry one Type A midget submarine aft of the conning tower.

== Construction and commissioning ==
Ordered under the Rapid Naval Armaments Supplement Programme and built by the Sasebo Naval Arsenal at Sasebo, Japan, I-46 was laid down on 21 November 1942 with the name Submarine No. 376 and was numbered I-46 on 25 May 1943. Launched on 3 June 1943 and provisionally attached to the Yokosuka Naval District, she was completed and commissioned on 29 February 1944.

== Service history ==
Upon commissioning, I-46 formally was attached to the Yokosuka Naval District and assigned to Submarine Squadron 11 for shakedown and work-ups. During a training sortie in the Iyo-nada on 2 April 1944, she collided underwater with the submarine Ro-46 off Minase Bight southwest of Kominasa Light at 21:45, suffering damage to her conning tower and periscopes. After repairs and testing, she arrived at the Sasebo Naval Arsenal on 7 May 1944 for additional repairs.

I-46 was reassigned to Submarine Division 15 in the 6th Fleet on 30 May 1944. On 12 August 1944, her commanding officer submitted a memorandum to the headquarters of the 6th Fleet and the commander of Submarine Squadron 11 suggesting improvements to the Type 13 air search radar installation and application of the anti-radar coating aboard I-46.

On 13 October 1944, the Combined Fleet ordered the activation of Operation Shō-Gō 1, the defense of the Philippine Islands, in anticipation of an American invasion of the islands. I-46 departed Kure, Japan, to begin her first war patrol and take part in Shō-Gō 1, assigned a patrol area 120 nautical miles (220 km; 140 mi) east of Leyte in the Philippines as part of the "B" Group. Her patrol area was the westernmost of those assigned to the submarines of her group, and was adjacent to the area assigned to the submarine I-54.

On 20 October 1944, the Battle of Leyte began with U.S. landings on Leyte. In response, major units of the Imperial Japanese Navy converged on Leyte, resulting in the Battle of Leyte Gulf, which lasted from 23 to 26 October 1944. On 24 October, the 6th Fleet ordered eleven submarines, including I-46, to converge in an area extending from Samar to Surigao Strait.

While I-46 was operating east of Leyte on 25 October 1944, a U.S. patrol plane forced her to dive at 06:45. A ship she identified from its propeller noises as a destroyer pursued her for the next eleven hours, during which she heard over 200 distant depth charge explosions.

On 26 October 1944, I-46 transmitted a report that she had sighted a small Allied convoy east of her patrol area. She was never heard from again. When the 6th Fleet ordered her to move to a new patrol station east of Leyte on 27 October 1944, she did not acknowledge the order.

=== Loss ===
The circumstances of I-46′s loss remain unknown. At 12:18 on 28 October 1944, the destroyers USS Gridley (DD-380) and USS Helm (DD-388) detected a submarine attempting to penetrate the screen of United States Navy Task Group 38.4 — which included the aircraft carriers USS Enterprise (CV-6), USS Franklin (CV-13), USS Belleau Wood (CVL-24), and USS San Jacinto (CVL-30) — east of Leyte. While the aircraft carriers steered away from the submarine contact at high speed, Gridley made three depth charge attacks against the submarine and Helm made four. After Helm′s fourth attack, which took place at 14:11, a large explosion followed by two smaller ones occurred. Oil and air bubbles appeared on the surface, and damaged deck planking and human remains were recovered after the attack. The submarine sank at 10°58′N 127°13′E.

On both 30 October and 1 November 1944, I-26, I-46, and I-54 all failed to make scheduled daily 19:00 status reports. On 2 December 1944, the Imperial Japanese Navy declared I-46 to be presumed lost east of the Philippines with the loss of all 112 men on board. She was stricken from the Navy list on 10 March 1945.

The identity of the submarine Gridley and Helm sank remains a mystery, and has been reported both as I-46 and I-54. In 1976, it also was suggested that the destroyer escort USS Lawrence C. Taylor (DE-415) sank I-46 in the Philippine Sea east of Samar on 18 November 1944, although the submarine Lawrence C. Taylor sank probably was I-41. Some historians have claimed that a submarine the destroyers USS Saufley (DD-465), USS Waller (DD-466), USS Pringle (DD-477), and USS Renshaw (DD-499) sank in the Ormoc Bay area on 28 November 1944 was I-46, but by then I-46 had been missing for over a month, and they most likely sank Yu 2.
