= Japanese submarine Ro-114 =

History

Japan
- Name: Submarine No. 405
- Builder: Kawasaki, Senshu and Kobe, Japan
- Laid down: 12 October 1942
- Renamed: Ro-114
- Launched: 19 June 1943
- Completed: 20 November 1943
- Commissioned: 20 November 1943
- Fate: Sunk 17 June 1944
- Stricken: 10 August 1944

General characteristics
- Class & type: Ro-100-class submarine
- Displacement: 611 tonnes (601 long tons) surfaced; 795 tonnes (782 long tons) submerged
- Length: 60.90 m (199 ft 10 in) overall
- Beam: 6.00 m (19 ft 8 in)
- Draft: 3.51 m (11 ft 6 in)
- Installed power: 1,000 bhp (750 kW) (diesel); 760 hp (570 kW) (electric motor)
- Propulsion: Diesel-electric; 1 × diesel engine; 1 × electric motor
- Speed: 14.2 knots (26.3 km/h; 16.3 mph) surfaced; 8 knots (15 km/h; 9.2 mph) submerged
- Range: 3,500 nmi (6,500 km; 4,000 mi) at 12 knots (22 km/h; 14 mph) surfaced; 60 nmi (110 km; 69 mi) at 3 knots (5.6 km/h; 3.5 mph) submerged
- Test depth: 75 m (246 ft)
- Crew: 38
- Armament: 4 × bow 533 mm (21 in) torpedo tubes; 2 × 25 mm (1 in) Type 96 anti-aircraft guns or 1 × 76.2 mm (3.00 in) L/40 AA gun

Ro-114 was an Imperial Japanese Navy Ro-100-class submarine. Completed and commissioned in November 1943, she served in World War II and was sunk in June 1944 during her first war patrol.

== Design and description ==
The Ro-100 class was a medium-sized, coastal submarine derived from the preceding Kaichū type. They displaced 611 tonnes (601 long tons) surfaced and 795 tonnes (782 long tons) submerged. The submarines were 60.9 meters (199 ft 10 in) long, had a beam of 6 meters (19 ft 8 in) and a draft of 3.51 meters (11 ft 6 in). They had a double hull and a diving depth of 75 meters (246 ft).

For surface running, the boats were powered by two 500-brake-horsepower (373 kW) diesel engines, each driving one propeller shaft. When submerged each propeller was driven by a 380-horsepower (283 kW) electric motor. They could reach 14.2 knots (26.3 km/h; 16.3 mph) on the surface and 8 knots (15 km/h; 9.2 mph) underwater. On the surface, the Ro-100s had a range of 3,500 nautical miles (6,500 km; 4,000 mi) at 12 knots (22 km/h; 14 mph); submerged, they had a range of 60 nmi (110 km; 69 mi) at 3 knots (5.6 km/h; 3.5 mph).

The boats were armed with four internal bow 53.3 cm (21 in) torpedo tubes and carried a total of eight torpedoes. They were also armed with two single mounts for 25 mm (1 in) Type 96 anti-aircraft guns or a single 76.2 mm (3 in) L/40 AA gun.

== Construction and commissioning ==
Ro-114 was laid down as Submarine No. 405 on 12 October 1942 by Kawasaki at Senshu, Japan. She had been renamed Ro-114 by the time she was launched on 19 June 1943. She then was towed to Kawasaki's shipyard at Kobe, Japan, for fitting-out. She was completed and commissioned at Kobe on 20 November 1943.

== Service history ==
=== November 1943–June 1944 ===
Upon commissioning, Ro-114 was attached to the Kure Naval District and was assigned to Submarine Squadron 11 for workups. On 20 December 1942, her commanding officer received orders to attend the Kure Submarine School to take a class on the new Type 92 electric torpedo.

On 7 February 1944, Ro-114 was reassigned to the headquarters of the Grand Escort Command to conduct antisubmarine operations in the Ryukyu Islands. She was reassigned to Submarine Division 30 in Submarine Squadron 8 on 20 February 1944, and on 11 March 1944 departed Kure for her first combat duty, an antisubmarine patrol in the Ryukyus under the direction of the Grand Escort Command.

Submarine Division 30 was disbanded on 25 March 1944, and that day Ro-114 was reassigned to Submarine Division 51. She departed Kure on 1 June 1944 bound for Saeki, then departed Saeki on 4 June 1944 to head for Saipan in the Mariana Islands, which she reached in early June 1944.

=== First war patrol ===
Ro-114 got underway from Saipan on 11 June 1944 for her first war patrol, assigned a patrol area off Saipan itself. On 12 June 1944, she reported that he had arrived in her patrol area.

On 13 June 1944 the Combined Fleet activated Operation A-Go for the defense of the Mariana Islands, and that day the commander-in-chief of the 6th Fleet, Vice Admiral Takeo Takagi, ordered all 18 submarines available to him to deploy east of the Marianas. The Battle of Saipan began with U.S. landings on Saipan on 15 June 1944. That day, the 6th Fleet ordered most of its submarines, including Ro-114, to withdraw from the Marianas. On 16 June 1944, she was ordered to join Patrol Unit C along with the submarines Ro-113, Ro-115, and Ro-117.

=== Loss ===
On 17 June 1944, the United States Navy destroyers USS Melvin (DD-680) and USS Wadleigh (DD-689) detected a submerged Japanese submarine on sonar in the Philippine Sea 80 nautical miles (150 km; 92 mi) west of Tinian. They sank it with depth charges at 15°02′N 144°10′E.

The submarine Melvin and Wadleigh sank probably was Ro-114. On 12 July 1944, the Imperial Japanese Navy declared Ro-114 to be presumed lost in the Philippines area with all 55 men on board. The Japanese struck her from the Navy list on 10 August 1944.
