= Japanese submarine I-52 =

Japanese submarine I-52 may refer to one of the following submarines of the Imperial Japanese Navy:

- Japanese submarine I-52 (1923), a Kaidai-type submarine; renamed I-152 in May 1942; stricken from active duty in August 1942; used as a stationary training vessel through end of World War II; scrapped in 1948
- Japanese submarine I-52 (1942), a Type C3-class cargo submarine; sunk on 24 June 1944 by a Grumman TBF Avenger flying from USS Bogue
