= Japanese submarine Ro-46 =

Kaichū-type submarine

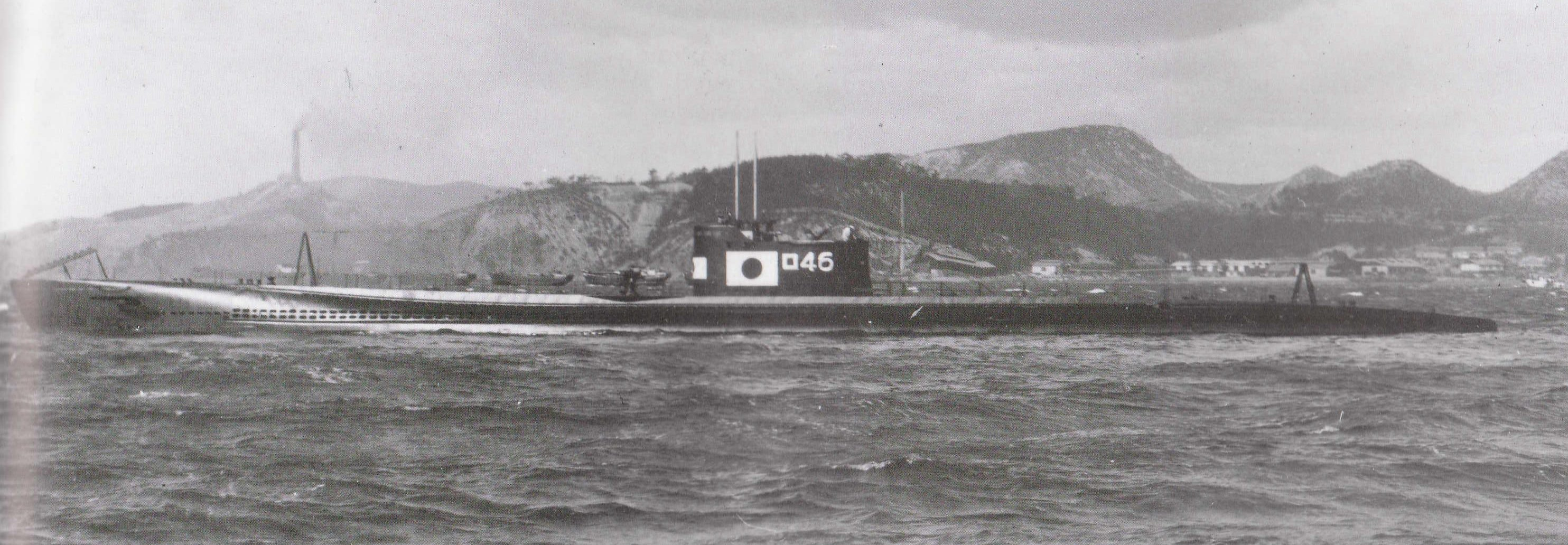
- Ro-46 on sea trials, 10 February 1944

History

Japan
- Name: Submarine No. 387
- Builder: Mitsubishi, Kobe, Japan
- Laid down: 13 June 1942
- Renamed: Ro-46 on 5 February 1943
- Launched: 23 May 1943
- Completed: 19 February 1944
- Commissioned: 19 February 1944
- Fate: Missing after 17 April 1945
- Stricken: 10 June 1945

General characteristics
- Class & type: Kaichū type submarine (K6 subclass)
- Displacement: 1,133 tonnes (1,115 long tons) surfaced; 1,470 tonnes (1,447 long tons) submerged
- Length: 80.5 m (264 ft 1 in) overall
- Beam: 7 m (23 ft 0 in)
- Draft: 4.07 m (13 ft 4 in)
- Installed power: 4,200 bhp (3,100 kW) (diesel); 1,200 hp (890 kW) (electric motor)
- Propulsion: Diesel-electric; 1 × diesel engine; 1 × electric motor
- Speed: 19.75 knots (36.58 km/h; 22.73 mph) surfaced; 8 knots (15 km/h; 9.2 mph) submerged
- Range: 5,000 nmi (9,300 km; 5,800 mi) at 16 knots (30 km/h; 18 mph) surfaced; 45 nmi (83 km; 52 mi) at 5 knots (9.3 km/h; 5.8 mph) submerged
- Test depth: 80 m (260 ft)
- Crew: 61
- Armament: 4 × bow 533 mm (21 in) torpedo tubes; 1 × 76.2 mm (3.00 in) L/40 anti-aircraft gun; 2 × single 25 mm (1.0 in) AA guns

Ro-46 was an Imperial Japanese Navy Kaichū type submarine of the K6 sub-class. Completed and commissioned in February 1944, she served in World War II, including operations related to the Marianas campaign, the Philippines campaign, and the Battle of Okinawa. She disappeared in April 1945 during her fifth war patrol.

== Design and description ==
The submarines of the K6 sub-class were versions of the preceding K5 sub-class with greater range and diving depth. They displaced 1,133 tonnes (1,115 long tons) surfaced and 1,470 tonnes (1,447 long tons) submerged. The submarines were 80.5 meters (264 ft 1 in) long, had a beam of 7 meters (23 ft 0 in) and a draft of 4.07 meters (13 ft 4 in). They had a diving depth of 80 meters (260 ft).

For surface running, the boats were powered by two 2,100-brake-horsepower (1,566 kW) diesel engines, each driving one propeller shaft. When submerged each propeller was driven by a 600-horsepower (447 kW) electric motor. They could reach 19.75 knots (36.58 km/h; 22.73 mph) on the surface and 8 knots (15 km/h; 9.2 mph) underwater. On the surface, the K6s had a range of 11,000 nautical miles (20,000 km; 13,000 mi) at 12 knots (22 km/h; 14 mph); submerged, they had a range of 45 nmi (83 km; 52 mi) at 5 knots (9.3 km/h; 5.8 mph).

The boats were armed with four internal bow 53.3 cm (21.0 in) torpedo tubes and carried a total of ten torpedoes. They were also armed with a single 76.2 mm (3.00 in) L/40 anti-aircraft gun and two single 25 mm (1.0 in) AA guns.

== Construction and commissioning ==
Ro-46 was laid down as Submarine No. 387 on 13 June 1942 by Mitsubishi Heavy Industries at Kobe, Japan. She was renamed Ro-46 on 5 February 1943 and was attached provisionally to the Maizuru Naval District that day. She was launched on 23 May 1943 and was completed and commissioned on 19 February 1944.

== Service history ==
Upon commissioning, Ro-46 was attached formally to the Maizuru Naval District. She called at Tokuyama to refuel from 28 to 29 March 1944. During a workup cruise, she was involved in an underwater collision with the submarine I-46 in the Iyo-nada in the Seto Inland Sea off Minase Light at 21:45 on 2 April 1944, suffering damage to her conning tower.

=== First war patrol ===
On 23 June 1944, Ro-46 was reassigned to Submarine Division 34 in the 6th Fleet, and she departed Kure, Japan, to begin her first war patrol, assigned a patrol area in the Mariana Islands off Saipan, where the Battle of Saipan had been raging since 15 June. U.S. forces attacked and damaged her on 3 July 1944, forcing her to return to Kure on 8 July 1944 for repairs.

=== Second war patrol ===
With her repairs complete, Ro-46 set out from Kure on 19 September 1944 to begin her second war patrol, assigned a patrol area southwest of Palau. She sighted a United States Navy aircraft carrier on 28 September 1944, but was too far away to attack. She sighted another aircraft carrier on 1 October 1944, but again did not attack.

On 2 October 1944, Ro-46 received orders to join the submarine I-177 in a reconnaissance of the American fleet anchorage at Ulithi Atoll, with Ro-46 approaching the atoll from the west while I-177 approached it from the east. The information they gathered was intended to support the first kaiten suicide attack torpedo operation against the anchorage. Ro-46 made her periscope reconnaissance of the anchorage on 7 October, reporting the aircraft carrier USS Bunker Hill (CV-17), two heavy cruisers, and their escorts there. She returned to Kure on 14 October 1944.

=== Third war patrol ===
On 13 October 1944, the day before Ro-46′s arrival at Kure, the Combined Fleet activated Operation Shō-Gō 1 for the defense of the Philippine Islands. The Philippines campaign and the Battle of Leyte began with the U.S. landings on Leyte on 20 October 1944, and that day Ro-46 got back underway from Kure for her third war patrol, ordered to operate as part of Submarine Group B and assigned a patrol area in the Philippine Sea east of the Philippines. The Japanese naval reaction to the invasion of Leyte resulted in the Battle of Leyte Gulf of 23–26 October 1944. Ro-46 saw no action during the battle, and on 7 November 1944 the 6th Fleet ordered all submarines in the Philippines area to return to Japan. On 13 November 1944, during her voyage to Japan, Ro-46 rescued the pilot of an Imperial Japanese Army Air Force Nakajima Ki-43 Hayabusa ("Peregrine Falcon"; Allied reporting name "Oscar") fighter shot down during combat over Manila. She arrived at Maizuru on 19 November 1944.

=== Fourth war patrol ===
On 8 January 1945, Ro-46 put to sea from Kure for her fourth war patrol, with a patrol area in the South China Sea west of Luzon. U.S. forces entered Lingayen Gulf and U.S. forces began their invasion of Luzon on 9 January 1945. On 29 January 1945, Ro-46 torpedoed the attack transport USS Cavalier (APA-37) at 14°48′N 119°18′E; although Cavalier survived, she had to be towed to Leyte. Ro-46 reported sinking a fleet oiler from a convoy at 01:13 on 30 January 1945, then departed the area.

On 2 or 4 February 1945 (sources differ), the 6th Fleet ordered Ro-46 and the submarines Ro-112, Ro-113, and Ro-115 to proceed to Takao, Formosa, unload their reserve torpedoes and deck gun ammunition there, and then head for Batulinao on the northern coast of Luzon to rescue Imperial Japanese Navy Air Service pilots stranded in Luzon's Aparri area and transport them to Takao. Ro-46 arrived at Takao on Formosa on 4 February 1945.

At Takao, Ro-46′s orders were modified to require her to transport fuel and ammunition to the Japanese forces fighting on Luzon, rescue at least 40 pilots from Batulinao, then proceed directly to Sasebo, Japan. She departed Takao on 7 February 1945 and arrived at Batulinao just before midnight on 10 February. After unloading her cargo into Daihatsu-class landing craft operated by the Imperial Japanese Army, she embarked 46 pilots and got back underway the same night. She transported the pilots to Takao, which she reached on 12 February 1945.

On 13 February 1945, Ro-46 departed Takao to return to Japan, ordered to conduct a reconnaissance of the Ryukyu Islands while en route. She arrived at Kure on 19 February 1945.

=== Fifth war patrol ===
Ro-46 got underway from Kure on 6 April 1945 for her fifth war patrol, assigned a patrol area northeast of Kitadaitōjima, which lies in the southern Ryukyu Islands southeast of Okinawa, where the Battle of Okinawa had begun on 1 April 1945. On 17 April 1945, she transmitted a report to the 6th Fleet from a position 60 nautical miles (110 km; 69 mi) northeast of Kitadaitōjima. The Japanese never heard from her again.

=== Loss ===
The circumstances of the loss of Ro-46 remain unknown. Some sources credit the U.S. Navy submarine USS Sea Owl (SS-405) with sinking her northeast of Wake Island on 18 April 1945, but Ro-46 was operating far from Wake Island and the Japanese submarine Sea Owl attacked was I-372 — which survived the attack. It is possible that aircraft of U.S. Navy Composite Squadron 92 (VC-92) operating from the escort aircraft carrier USS Tulagi (CVE-72) sank Ro-46 at 24°15′N 131°16′E on 29 April 1945.

On 2 May 1945, the Imperial Japanese Navy declared Ro-46 to be presumed lost in the Okinawa area with all 86 men on board. She was stricken from the Navy list on 10 June 1945.
