= Japanese submarine I-183 =

1943 Type KD7 submarine

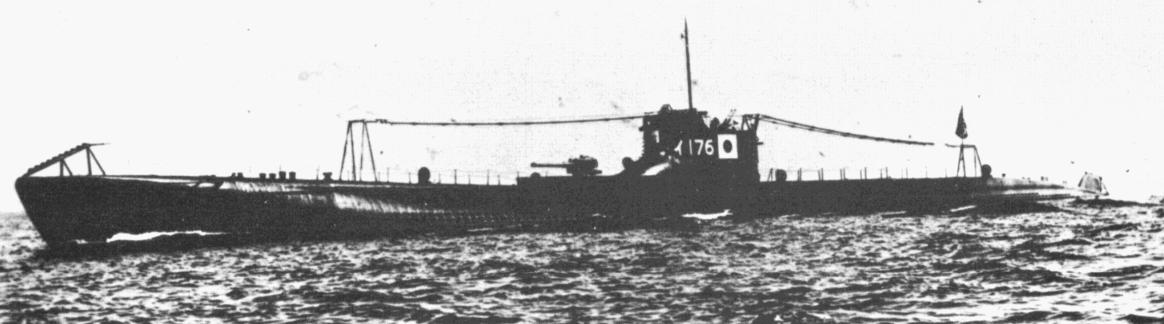
- Sister ship I-176 at sea, 1942

History

Empire of Japan
- Name: Submarine No. 161
- Builder: Kawasaki Dockyard Company, Kobe, Japan
- Laid down: 26 December 1941
- Renamed: I-83 on unknown date; I-183 on 20 May 1942
- Launched: 21 January 1943
- Completed: 3 October 1943
- Fate: Sunk, 29 April 1944
- Stricken: 30 August 1944

General characteristics
- Class & type: Kaidai type, KD7-class submarine
- Displacement: 1,862 t (1,833 long tons) surfaced; 2,644 t (2,602 long tons) submerged
- Length: 105.5 m (346 ft 2 in)
- Beam: 8.25 m (27 ft 1 in)
- Draft: 4.6 m (15 ft 1 in)
- Installed power: 8,000 bhp (5,966 kW) (diesel engines); 1,800 hp (1,342 kW) (electric motors)
- Propulsion: Diesel-electric; 2 × diesel engines; 2 × electric motors
- Speed: 23 knots (43 km/h; 26 mph) surfaced; 8 knots (15 km/h; 9.2 mph) submerged
- Range: 8,000 nmi (15,000 km; 9,200 mi) at 16 knots (30 km/h; 18 mph) surfaced; 50 nmi (93 km; 58 mi) at 5 knots (9.3 km/h; 5.8 mph) submerged
- Test depth: 80 m (262 ft)
- Complement: 86
- Armament: 6 × 533 mm (21 in) torpedo tubes (all bow); 1 × 120 mm (4.7 in) deck gun; 1 × twin 25 mm (1.0 in) Type 96 AA gun

I-183 (originally I-83) was an Imperial Japanese Navy Kaidai type cruiser submarine of the KD7 sub-class commissioned in 1943. During World War II, she was sunk with all hands by United States Navy fleet submarine in April 1944.

== Design and description ==
The submarines of the KD7 sub-class were medium-range attack submarines developed from the preceding KD6 sub-class. They displaced 1,862 metric tons (1,833 long tons) surfaced and 2,644 metric tons (2,602 long tons) submerged. The submarines were 105.5 meters (346 ft 2 in) long and had a beam of 8.25 meters (27 ft 1 in) and a draft of 4.6 meters (15 ft 1 in). They had a diving depth of 80 m (262 ft) and a complement of 86 officers and crewmen.

For surface running, the submarines were powered by two 4,000-brake-horsepower (2,983 kW) diesel engines, each driving one propeller shaft. When submerged, each propeller was driven by a 900-horsepower (671 kW) electric motor. The submarines could reach 23 knots (43 km/h; 26 mph) on the surface and 8 knots (15 km/h; 9.2 mph) underwater. On the surface, the KD7s had a range of 8,000 nautical miles (15,000 km; 9,200 mi) at 16 knots (30 km/h; 18 mph); submerged, they had a range of 50 nmi (93 km; 58 mi) at 5 knots (9.3 km/h; 5.8 mph).

The submarines were armed with six internal 53.3 cm (21.0 in) torpedo tubes, all in the bow. They carried one reload for each tube; a total of 12 torpedoes. They were originally intended to be armed with two twin-gun mounts for the 25 mm (1.0 in) Type 96 anti-aircraft gun, but a 120 mm (4.7 in) deck gun for combat on the surface was substituted for one 25 mm mount during construction.

== Construction and commissioning ==
I-183 was laid down as Submarine No. 161 by the Kawasaki Dockyard Company at its shipyard in Kobe, Japan, on 26 December 1941 She later was named I-83, then was renamed I-183 on 20 May 1942. She was launched on 21 January 1943 and completed and commissioned on 3 October 1943.

== Service history ==
=== October–December 1943 ===
On the day of her commissioning, I-183 was attached to the Sasebo Naval District and assigned to Submarine Squadron 11 in the 1st Fleet, an element of the Combined Fleet. On 5 October 1943, she got underway from Kobe for workups in Hiroshima Bay and in the Iyo Nada in the Seto Inland Sea.

At 10:40 on 6 October 1943, I-183 began diving exercises in the waters of Hiroshima Bay west of Osu on Etajima. During a practice crash dive, a sailor failed to close the main induction valve, causing I-183's engine room to flood. I-183's crew made an emergency blow of her main ballast tank, but her stern sank to the bottom, and she came to rest with her bow sticking out of the water. Engineer Lieutenant Yoshio Hirobe managed to close the watertight hatch leading to the aft crew compartment, containing flooding to the main engine room and electric motor room, but trapping him and 15 other men in the aft section of I-183. Most of I-183's crew escaped through her forward torpedo tubes, and local fishermen rescued them.

After a floating crane and a team of divers arrived on the scene from the Kure Naval Arsenal at Kure, Japan, a rescue operation began at 20:00 on 6 October 1943 under the personal direction of the commander of Submarine Squadron 11, Rear Admiral Marquis Tadashige Daigo. I-183 was refloated at 1400 on 7 October 1943, but by then all 16 men trapped in the after compartment had died.

While I-183 was under repair after her accident, Submarine Squadron 11 was reassigned to the 6th Fleet, another element of the Combined Fleet, on 25 November 1943.

=== January–April 1944 ===
Repairs to I-183 were completed in January 1944, and she began post-repair workups that month. On 27 March 1944, Japanese forces sighted an Allied task force heading toward Palau, and I-183 and the submarines I-44, Ro-47, Ro-116, and Ro-117 received orders to patrol in the Pacific Ocean east of Palau. I-183 got underway in company with I-44 on 31 March 1944 bound for her patrol area, but she suffered a mechanical failure that forced her to turn back, and she returned to Kure on 6 April 1944 for repairs.

On 28 April 1944, I-183 was reassigned to Submarine Squadron 22 in the 6th Fleet. With her repairs complete, she departed Kure that day bound for Saipan in the Mariana Islands and then Truk Atoll in the Caroline Islands.

=== Loss ===
On the first evening of her voyage, I-183 was exiting the Bungo Strait on the surface, zigzagging and making 17 knots (31 km/h; 20 mph), when the United States Navy submarine USS Pogy detected her on radar at 21:21 on 28 April 1944. Pogy gave chase at flank speed, and by 00:34 on 29 April 1944 had closed to a range of 1,300 yards (1,200 m) 30 nautical miles (56 km; 35 mi) south of Cape Ashizuri, the southernmost point of Shikoku. Pogy fired four Mark 23 torpedoes set to run at a depth of 6 feet (1.8 m). The second torpedo struck I-183 at 00:36, and she sank in 40 seconds at 32°07′N 133°03′E. Pogy′s crew heard four or five loud explosions at 00:39, and after 00:42 Pogy reversed course and passed through a large oil slick which her patrol report described as "smelling like the new 100-octane aromatic aviation gasoline."

On 28 May 1944, the Imperial Japanese Navy declared I-183 to be presumed lost with all 92 hands south of Honshu. The Japanese struck her from the Navy List on 10 August 1944.
