= Japanese submarine Ro-117 =

History

Japan
- Name: Submarine No. 408
- Builder: Kawasaki, Kobe, Japan
- Laid down: 16 January 1943
- Renamed: Ro-117 on 5 July 1943
- Launched: 13 September 1943
- Completed: 31 January 1944
- Commissioned: 31 January 1944
- Fate: Sunk 17 June 1944
- Stricken: 10 August 1944

General characteristics
- Class & type: Ro-100-class submarine
- Displacement: 611 tonnes (601 long tons) surfaced; 795 tonnes (782 long tons) submerged
- Length: 60.90 m (199 ft 10 in) overall
- Beam: 6.00 m (19 ft 8 in)
- Draft: 3.51 m (11 ft 6 in)
- Installed power: 1,000 bhp (750 kW) (diesel); 760 hp (570 kW) (electric motor)
- Propulsion: Diesel-electric; 1 × diesel engine; 1 × electric motor
- Speed: 14.2 knots (26.3 km/h; 16.3 mph) surfaced; 8 knots (15 km/h; 9.2 mph) submerged
- Range: 3,500 nmi (6,500 km; 4,000 mi) at 12 knots (22 km/h; 14 mph) surfaced; 60 nmi (110 km; 69 mi) at 3 knots (5.6 km/h; 3.5 mph) submerged
- Test depth: 75 m (246 ft)
- Crew: 38
- Armament: 4 × bow 533 mm (21 in) torpedo tubes; 2 × 25 mm (1 in) Type 96 anti-aircraft guns or 1 × 76.2 mm (3.00 in) L/40 AA gun

Service record
- Part of: Submarine Squadron 11; 31 January – 4 June 1944; Submarine Squadron 7; 4 June 1944 – 17 June 1944
- Commanders: Kaigun-shōsa Yasuo Enomoto; 31 January 1944 – 17 June 1944
- Operations: First war patrol; 31 March 1944 – 13 April 1944; Second war patrol; 4 May 1944 – 17 June 1944
- Victories: None

Ro-117 was an Imperial Japanese Navy Ro-100-class submarine. Completed and commissioned in January 1944, she served in World War II and was sunk in June 1944 during her second war patrol.

== Design and description ==
The Ro-100 class was a medium-sized, coastal submarine derived from the preceding Kaichū type. They displaced 611 tonnes (601 long tons) surfaced and 795 tonnes (782 long tons) submerged. The submarines were 60.9 meters (199 ft 10 in) long, had a beam of 6 meters (19 ft 8 in) and a draft of 3.51 meters (11 ft 6 in). They had a double hull and a diving depth of 75 meters (246 ft).

For surface running, the boats were powered by two 500-brake-horsepower (373 kW) diesel engines, each driving one propeller shaft. When submerged each propeller was driven by a 380-horsepower (283 kW) electric motor. They could reach 14.2 knots (26.3 km/h; 16.3 mph) on the surface and 8 knots (15 km/h; 9.2 mph) underwater. On the surface, the Ro-100s had a range of 3,500 nautical miles (6,500 km; 4,000 mi) at 12 knots (22 km/h; 14 mph); submerged, they had a range of 60 nmi (110 km; 69 mi) at 3 knots (5.6 km/h; 3.5 mph).

The boats were armed with four internal bow 53.3 cm (21.0 in) torpedo tubes and carried a total of eight torpedoes. They were also armed with two single mounts for 25 mm (1 in) Type 96 anti-aircraft guns or a single 76.2 mm (3.00 in) L/40 AA gun.

== Construction and commissioning ==
Ro-117 was laid down as Submarine No. 408 on 16 January 1943 by Kawasaki at Kobe, Japan. She was renamed Ro-117 on 5 July 1943 and was attached provisionally to the Yokosuka Naval District that day. She was launched on 13 September 1943, and was completed and commissioned on 31 January 1944, with Lieutenant Commander Yasuo Enomoto in command.

== Service history ==
Upon commissioning, Ro-117 was attached formally to the Yokosuka Naval District and was assigned to Submarine Squadron 11 for workups.

=== First war patrol ===
Ro-117 got underway from Japan on 31 March 1944 along with the submarine Ro-116 for her first war patrol, ordered to intercept an Allied task force operating in the vicinity of the Palau Islands. She did not find the task force, and returned to Japan on 13 April 1944.

=== Second war patrol ===
On 4 May 1944, Ro-117 was reassigned to Submarine Division 51 in Submarine Squadron 7 in the 6th Fleet. She departed Kure, Japan, on 15 May 1944, called at Saipan in the Mariana Islands from 24 to 26 May 1944, then proceeded to Truk, which she reached on 31 May 1944.

Ro-117 got underway from Truk on 4 June 1944 for her second war patrol with orders to join a submarine patrol line north of New Ireland. On 13 June 1944 the Combined Fleet activated Operation A-Go for the defense of the Mariana Islands, and that day the commander-in-chief of the 6th Fleet, Vice Admiral Takeo Takagi, ordered all available submarines to deploy east of the Marianas. On 14 June 1944, Ro-117 received orders to proceed at flank speed to a new patrol area off the Marianas east of Guam.

The Battle of Saipan began with U.S. landings on Saipan on 15 June 1944. That day, the 6th Fleet ordered most of its submarines, including Ro-117, to withdraw from the Marianas. On 16 June 1944, Ro-117 was ordered to join Patrol Unit C along with the submarines Ro-113, Ro-115, and Ro-116. Ro-117 specifically was directed to patrol southeast of Tinian between the patrol areas of Ro-111 and Ro-113.

=== Loss ===
In the predawn darkness of 17 June 1944, Ro-117 was on the surface 350 nautical miles (650 km; 400 mi) southeast of Saipan when an Eniwetok-based United States Navy PB4Y-1 Liberator patrol bomber of Bombing Squadron 109 detected her on radar. The plane attacked Ro-117 at 03:38 and sank her with all hands at 11°05′N 150°31′E.

Ro-117 was ordered to return to Truk on 22 June 1944 but did not respond. On 12 July 1944, the Imperial Japanese Navy declared her to be presumed lost off Saipan with all 55 men on board. The Japanese struck her from the Navy list on 10 August 1944.
