= 6th Fleet (Imperial Japanese Navy) =

Fleet of the Imperial Japanese Navy (IJN)

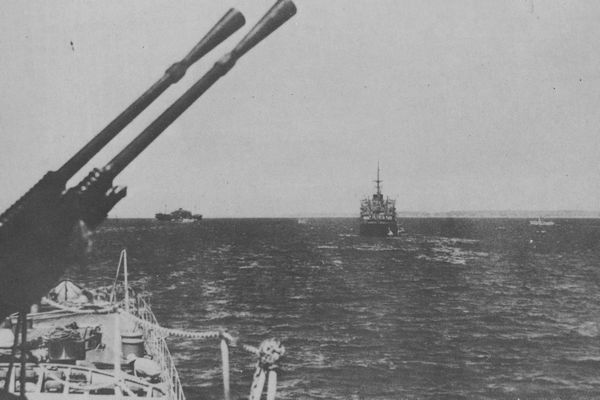
6th Fleet in February 1942

The 6th Fleet (第六艦隊, Dai-roku Kantai) was a fleet of the Imperial Japanese Navy (IJN) that during World War II, had primary responsibility for the command of submarine operations.

== History ==
The 6th Fleet was formed on 15 November 1940, and was assigned general control of all IJN submarine operations. Its initial mission was reconnaissance off the west coast of the United States, east coast of Australia, and the sea lanes of the Indian Ocean.

=== Background ===
Japan had prior to the attack on Pearl Harbor a diverse submarine fleet, some of which had unique distinctions: the only submarines in existence of over 5,000 tons submerged displacement, submarines over 400 feet in length (until the advent of nuclear power), the 41 submarines in its retinue (and of the world) that could carry specially designed aircraft, and submarines with the longest ranges and highest speeds of any nation. With the development of the Type 95 submarine-launched variant of the Long Lance oxygen-propelled torpedo, Japan not only had the world's most advanced torpedo, but one with the largest warhead.

Despite these advantages, IJN submarines achieved remarkably little during World War II primarily having in hindsight suffered from the antiquated strategy of the Imperial Japanese Navy General Staff, who viewed submarines as little more than scouts whose main role was to locate and shadow enemy naval task forces in preparation for a decisive surface conflict. Maybe the IJN General Staff was slow to change as the submarines were generally slow to dive, easy to track with radar and sonar, difficult to maneuver underwater, and less sturdy than their German U-boat counterparts.

=== Early stages of the Pacific War ===
At the start of the Pacific War, midget submarines were used in preparatory reconnaissance of the US Navy anchorage at Pearl Harbor, Hawaii, and in the initial stages of the attack on Pearl Harbor. With the outbreak of general war, the mission of the 6th Fleet expanded to include shipping interdiction and mine laying. A few specialized missions, such as the attack on Sydney Harbour with the use of midget submarines were also undertaken. The 6th fleet cooperated briefly with the Kriegsmarine (German navy) in the Indian Ocean in operations to interdict British commerce from its base in Penang, but these missions were few. The IJN General Staff placed more emphasis on ambush operations of Allied capital ships. In 1942, Japanese submarines were credited with sinking two aircraft carriers, one cruiser and several destroyers, as well as damaging one aircraft carrier and two battleships.

The success of 1942 was difficult to repeat in forthcoming years with the vast scale of the World War II Pacific conflict, which made it difficult for a submarine to be in "right place at the right time" to make a successful attack, and the increased anti-submarine attention and capabilities by the US Navy.

=== Latter stages of the Pacific War ===
After 1942, the IJN General Staff had little support to continue submarine use in commerce interdiction or ambush operations. Instead, the massive Japanese surface vessel losses in such actions as the Solomon Islands campaign called for numerous submarine sorties to defend the transport of critical supplies and reinforcements to isolated military island posts instead of offensive military actions.

Development of anti-submarine warfare by the US Navy resulted in ever-increasing losses for the IJN: they started the war with 63 ocean-going submarines (not including midgets), and completed construction of 111 during the war. Of these 174 IJN vessels, 128 were lost during the conflict and most of the surviving equipment were training vessels, or having been completed so near the end of the war never saw combat. None of the 30 submarines that supported the attack on Pearl Harbor survived the war.

Kwajalein in the Marshall Islands was the main base for Japanese submarine operations in the Pacific until it fell to the US in February 1944; the 6th fleet headquarters was relocated to Saipan in the Mariana Islands. The latter's fall to the US in July 1944 resulted in the deaths of the 6th fleet commander-in-chief Admiral Takeo Takagi and most of his staff.

The increased vigilance of the US Fleet during the Battle of the Philippines, and until of the war, relegated IJN submarine use largely as carriers for kaiten suicide missions.

The final sortie of the 6th fleet was after the termination of the war, when the super submarine Japanese submarine I-401 returned to Yokosuka from Ulithi.

== Organization ==
=== 15 November 1940 ===
- Submarine Squadron 1 : Training cruiser Katori (Flagship), Submarine tender Taigei, Submarine I-20
  - Submarine Division 1 : Submarine I-15, I-16, I-17
- Submarine Squadron 2 : Light cruiser Isuzu
  - Submarine Division 11 : Submarine I-74, I-75
  - Submarine Division 12 : Submarine I-68, I-69, I-70
  - Submarine Division 20 : Submarine I-71, I-72, I-73
- Submarine Squadron 3 : Submarine tender Chōgei, Submarine I-7
  - Submarine Division 7 : Submarine I-1, I-2, I-3
  - Submarine Division 8 : Submarine I-4, I-5, I-6

=== 1 December 1941 ===
- Training cruiser Katori (Flagship), Fleet oiler Ondo
- Submarine Squadron 1 : Auxiliary submarine tender Yasukuni Maru, Submarine I-9
  - Submarine Division 1 : Submarine I-15, I-16, I-17
  - Submarine Division 2 : Submarine I-18, I-19, I-20
  - Submarine Division 3 : Submarine I-21, I-22, I-23
  - Submarine Division 4 : Submarine I-24, I-25, I-26
- Submarine Squadron 2 : Auxiliary submarine tender Santos Maru, Submarine I-7, I-10
  - Submarine Division 7 : Submarine I-1, I-2, I-3
  - Submarine Division 8 : Submarine I-4, I-5, I-6
- Submarine Squadron 3 : Submarine tender Taigei, Submarine I-8
  - Submarine Division 11 : Submarine I-74, I-75
  - Submarine Division 12 : Submarine I-68, I-69, I-70
  - Submarine Division 20 : Submarine I-71, I-72, I-73

=== 15 June 1944 ===
6th Fleet does not have a flagship, because the headquarters moved ashore.

- Submarine I-10
- Submarine Squadron 7
  - Submarine Division 51 : Submarines Ro-109, Ro-112, Ro-113, Ro-114, Ro-115, Ro-117
- Submarine Squadron 8: Submarine I-8, I-26, I-27, I-28, I-37, I-52, I-165, I-166, Ro-501
- Submarine Squadron 11 : Submarine tender Chōgei, Submarine I-33, I-46, I-54, I-55, I-361, I-362, Ro-46, Ro-48
- Submarine Division 7 : Submarine I-5, I-6
- Submarine Division 12 : Submarine I-169, I-174, I-175, I-176
- Submarine Division 15 : Submarine I-16, I-32, I-36, I-38, I-41, I-44, I-45, I-53
- Submarine Flotilla 22 : Submarine I-177, I-180, I-183, I-184, I-185
- Submarine Flotilla 34 : Submarine Ro-36, Ro-41, Ro-42, Ro-43, Ro-44, Ro-45, Ro-47

=== 1 June 1945 ===
- Patrol Squadron 22 : Auxiliary boom defence vessel Kiku-maru
  - 4 Patrol Divisions
- Hunter-Killer Squadron 31 : Destroyer Hanazuki
  - Destroyer Division 17 : Destroyer Yukikaze
  - Destroyer Division 41 : Destroyer Suzutsuki, Fuyutsuki
  - Destroyer Division 43 : Destroyer Take, Kiri, Maki, Sii
  - Destroyer Division 52 : Destroyer Sugi, Kashi, Kaba, Escort ship CD-31, CD-43
- Submarine Squadron 11 : Submarine tender Chōgei, Submarine I-201, I-202, I-203
- Submarine Division 1 : Submarine I-13, I-400, I-401
- Submarine Division 15 : Submarine I-36, I-47, I-53, I-58
- Submarine Division 16 : Submarine I-369, I-372, Ha-101, Ha-102, Ha-104
- Submarine Division 34 : Submarine Ha-109

== Commanders of the IJN 6th Fleet ==
Commander in chief

| | Rank | Name | Date | |
|---|---|---|---|---|
| 1 | Vice-Admiral | Noboru Hirata | 15 November 1940 | 21 July 1941 |
| 2 | Vice-Admiral | Mitsumi Shimizu | 21 July 1941 | 16 March 1942 |
| 3 | Vice-Admiral | Marquis Teruhisa Komatsu | 16 March 1942 | 21 June 1943 |
| 4 | Vice-Admiral | Takeo Takagi | 21 June 1943 | 10 July 1944 |
| 5 | Vice-Admiral | Shigeyoshi Miwa | 10 July 1944 | 1 May 1945 |
| 6 | Vice-Admiral | Marquis Tadashige Daigo | 1 May 1945 | 15 September 1945 |

Chief of staff

| | Rank | Name | Date | |
|---|---|---|---|---|
| 1 | Vice-Admiral | Hisashi Ichioka | 15 November 1940 | 6 January 1941 |
| 2 | Vice-Admiral | Hisashi Mito | 6 January 1941 | 22 October 1942 |
| 3 | Rear Admiral | Hisagoro Shimamoto | 22 October 1942 | 15 November 1943 |
| 4 | Rear Admiral | Kozo Nishina | 15 November 1943 | 21 December 1944 |
| 5 | Rear Admiral | Hankyu Sasaki | 21 December 1944 | 15 September 1945 |
