= Japanese submarine Ro-43 =

Kaichū-type submarine

History

Japan
- Name: Submarine No. 209
- Builder: Mitsubishi, Kobe, Japan
- Laid down: 6 October 1942
- Launched: 5 June 1943
- Renamed: Ro-43 on 5 June 1943
- Completed: 16 December 1943
- Commissioned: 16 December 1943
- Fate: Sunk 26 February 1945
- Stricken: 10 April 1945

General characteristics
- Class & type: Kaichū type submarine (K6 subclass)
- Displacement: 1,133 tonnes (1,115 long tons) surfaced; 1,470 tonnes (1,447 long tons) submerged
- Length: 80.5 m (264 ft 1 in) overall
- Beam: 7 m (23 ft 0 in)
- Draft: 4.07 m (13 ft 4 in)
- Installed power: 4,200 bhp (3,100 kW) (diesel); 1,200 hp (890 kW) (electric motor)
- Propulsion: Diesel-electric; 1 × diesel engine; 1 × electric motor
- Speed: 19.75 knots (36.58 km/h; 22.73 mph) surfaced; 8 knots (15 km/h; 9.2 mph) submerged
- Range: 5,000 nmi (9,300 km; 5,800 mi) at 16 knots (30 km/h; 18 mph) surfaced; 45 nmi (83 km; 52 mi) at 5 knots (9.3 km/h; 5.8 mph) submerged
- Test depth: 80 m (260 ft)
- Crew: 61
- Armament: 4 × bow 533 mm (21 in) torpedo tubes; 1 × 76.2 mm (3.00 in) L/40 anti-aircraft gun; 2 × single 25 mm (1.0 in) AA guns

Ro-43 was an Imperial Japanese Navy Kaichū type submarine of the K6 sub-class. Completed and commissioned in December 1943, she served in World War II and was sunk in February 1945 during her fifth war patrol.

== Design and description ==
The submarines of the K6 sub-class were versions of the preceding K5 sub-class with greater range and diving depth. They displaced 1,133 tonnes (1,115 long tons) surfaced and 1,470 tonnes (1,447 long tons) submerged. The submarines were 80.5 meters (264 ft 1 in) long, had a beam of 7 meters (23 ft 0 in) and a draft of 4.07 meters (13 ft 4 in). They had a diving depth of 80 meters (260 ft).

For surface running, the boats were powered by two 2,100-brake-horsepower (1,566 kW) diesel engines, each driving one propeller shaft. When submerged each propeller was driven by a 600-horsepower (447 kW) electric motor. They could reach 19.75 knots (36.58 km/h; 22.73 mph) on the surface and 8 knots (15 km/h; 9.2 mph) underwater. On the surface, the K6s had a range of 11,000 nautical miles (20,000 km; 13,000 mi) at 12 knots (22 km/h; 14 mph); submerged, they had a range of 45 nmi (83 km; 52 mi) at 5 knots (9.3 km/h; 5.8 mph).

The boats were armed with four internal bow 53.3 cm (21.0 in) torpedo tubes and carried a total of ten torpedoes. They were also armed with a single 76.2 mm (3.00 in) L/40 anti-aircraft gun and two single 25 mm (1.0 in) AA guns.

== Construction and commissioning ==
Ro-43 was laid down as Submarine No. 209 on 6 October 1942 by Mitsubishi Heavy Industries at Kobe, Japan. She was launched on 5 June 1943 and was renamed Ro-43 that day. She was completed and commissioned on 16 December 1943.

== Service history ==
=== March–June 1944 ===
Upon commissioning, Ro-43 was attached to the Maizuru Naval District and assigned to Submarine Squadron 11 for workups. On 10 March 1944, she was reassigned to Submarine Division 34 in the 6th Fleet.

On 11 March 1944, Ro-43 departed Kure, Japan, bound for Truk. While at sea on 19 March 1943, she received orders to intercept an Allied task force off Truk, but that day a malfunctioning valve caused a compressed-air explosion which wrecked one of her ballast tanks on her starboard side. She reported that she was experiencing flooding and was unable to dive, and she requested permission to proceed to Truk, which she reached on 29 March 1944. On 31 March 1944 she got back underway for Maizuru, where she arrived on 9 April 1944. She began an overhaul and repairs there.

After completion of the work, Ro-43 departed Maizuru on 4 June 1944. She arrived at Saipan in the Mariana Islands on 10 June 1944.

=== First war patrol ===
Ro-43 got underway from Saipan on 11 June 1944 to begin her first war patrol, ordered to operate as part of a submarine patrol line off the Marianas. On 13 June 1944 the Combined Fleet activated Operation A-Go for the defense of the Mariana Islands, and that day the commander-in-chief of the 6th Fleet, Vice Admiral Takeo Takagi, ordered all available Japanese submarines including Ro-43 to deploy east of the Marianas. The Battle of Saipan began with U.S. landings on Saipan on 15 June 1944, and on 16 June 1944, Ro-43 was assigned to Submarine Group B and ordered to operate as part of a patrol line southeast of the Marianas.

Ro-43 was on the surface off Rota on 16 June 1944 proceeding to her new operating area when a United States Navy destroyer surprised her and opened gunfire on her at 21:44. After she submerged, the destroyer continued its attack with depth charges. Ro-43 escaped, but not before diving so far below her designed depth limit that she suffered severe structural damage, rendering her unable to continue her patrol. Her commanding officer reported this to 6th Fleet headquarters on 18 June 1944 and received orders on 21 June 1944 to return to Japan. She reached Maizuru on 26 June 1944 for refit and overhaul, later moving to Kure. Based on the damage Ro-43 suffered in escaping the destroyer, the Japanese Ministry of the Navy later issued orders that no submarine was to dive to a depth greater than 1.3 times her designed depth limit.

=== Second war patrol ===
With her repairs and overhaul complete, Ro-43 set out from Kure on 17 September 1944 to begin her second war patrol, assigned a patrol area southeast of Palau. Her patrol was uneventful, and she returned to Kure on 14 October 1944.

=== Third war patrol ===
On 13 October 1944, the day before Ro-43′s arrival at Kure, the Combined Fleet activated Operation Shō-Gō 1 for the defense of the Philippine Islands. Accordingly, Ro-43 got back underway from Kure on 19 October 1944 to operate as part of Submarine Group B, assigned a patrol area in the Philippine Sea east of the Philippines. The Philippines campaign and the Battle of Leyte began with the U.S. landings on Leyte on 20 October 1944, and the Japanese naval reaction to the invasion resulted in the Battle of Leyte Gulf of 23–26 October 1944. Ro-43 saw no action during the battle, but on 31 October 1944 she and the submarine Ro-41 received orders to patrol in the San Bernardino Strait between Luzon and Samar and report and attack any Allied forces attempting to interfere with Japanese convoys bringing supplies and reinforcements from Manila to Leyte. Ro-43 encountered no Allied forces. She received orders on 8 November 1944 to return to Japan, and she arrived at Sasebo on 16 November 1944.

=== Fourth war patrol ===
On 8 December 1944, Ro-43 put to sea from Sasebo for her fourth war patrol, with a patrol area in the Philippine Sea east of Luzon. After an uneventful patrol, she received orders on 27 December 1944 to return to Japan. She arrived at Kure on 4 January 1945.

=== Fifth war patrol ===
By 13 February 1945, Ro-43 was preparing to depart Kure on 14 February to carry a cargo of 450-millimeter (17.7 in) Type 97 torpedoes to a midget submarine unit based on Cebu in the Philippine Islands, but the voyage was cancelled that day due to Allied activities in the Okinawa area. Instead, she departed Kure on 16 February 1945 to conduct her fifth war patrol, bound for an operating area east of Okinawa. On 17 February 1945, she received orders to patrol 75 nautical miles (139 km; 86 mi) east of Iwo Jima. The Battle of Iwo Jima began on 19 February 1945 with U.S. landings on the island.

=== Loss ===
On 25 February 1945, the destroyer USS Bennion (DD-662) detected a submerged submarine on sonar off the Volcano Islands. The nearby escort aircraft carrier USS Anzio (CVE-57) launched a radar-equipped TBM Avenger torpedo bomber of Composite Squadron 82 (VC-82) to search for the submarine. Early on 26 February, she launched another Avenger, which picked up a surface contact at 02:20. As the Avenger flew over the contact, its pilot sighted a submerging submarine. The Avenger dropped two sonobuoys and a Mark 24 "Fido" acoustic homing torpedo which sank the submarine at 24°07′N 140°19′E. By dawn on 27 February 1945, a large oil slick covered the area.

The submarine the Avenger sank probably was Ro-43, which became the first Japanese submarine lost during the Battle of Iwo Jima. On 14 March 1945, the Imperial Japanese Navy declared her to be presumed lost off Iwo Jima with the loss of all 79 men on board. She was stricken from the Navy list on 10 April 1945.
