= Japanese submarine Ro-115 =

Japanese Submarine

History

Japan
- Name: Submarine No. 406
- Builder: Kawasaki, Kobe, Japan
- Laid down: 12 October 1942
- Renamed: Ro-115
- Launched: 19 June 1943
- Completed: 30 November 1943
- Commissioned: 30 November 1943
- Fate: Sunk 1 February 1945
- Stricken: 10 May 1945

General characteristics
- Class & type: Ro-100-class submarine
- Displacement: 611 tonnes (601 long tons) surfaced; 795 tonnes (782 long tons) submerged
- Length: 60.90 m (199 ft 10 in) overall
- Beam: 6.00 m (19 ft 8 in)
- Draft: 3.51 m (11 ft 6 in)
- Installed power: 1,000 bhp (750 kW) (diesel); 760 hp (570 kW) (electric motor)
- Propulsion: Diesel-electric; 1 × diesel engine; 1 × electric motor
- Speed: 14.2 knots (26.3 km/h; 16.3 mph) surfaced; 8 knots (15 km/h; 9.2 mph) submerged
- Range: 3,500 nmi (6,500 km; 4,000 mi) at 12 knots (22 km/h; 14 mph) surfaced; 60 nmi (110 km; 69 mi) at 3 knots (5.6 km/h; 3.5 mph) submerged
- Test depth: 75 m (246 ft)
- Crew: 38
- Armament: 4 × bow 533 mm (21 in) torpedo tubes; 2 × 25 mm (1 in) Type 96 anti-aircraft guns or 1 × 76.2 mm (3.00 in) L/40 AA gun

Ro-115 was an Imperial Japanese Navy Ro-100-class submarine. Completed and commissioned in November 1943, she served in World War II, operating in the central Pacific Ocean, the New Guinea campaign, the Indian Ocean, and off the Philippine Islands. She was sunk in February 1945 during her fifth war patrol.

== Design and description ==
The Ro-100 class was a medium-sized, coastal submarine derived from the preceding Kaichū type. They displaced 611 tonnes (601 long tons) surfaced and 795 tonnes (782 long tons) submerged. The submarines were 60.9 meters (199 ft 10 in) long, had a beam of 6 meters (19 ft 8 in) and a draft of 3.51 meters (11 ft 6 in). They had a double hull and a diving depth of 75 meters (246 ft).

For surface running, the boats were powered by two 500-brake-horsepower (373 kW) diesel engines, each driving one propeller shaft. When submerged each propeller was driven by a 380-horsepower (283 kW) electric motor. They could reach 14.2 knots (26.3 km/h; 16.3 mph) on the surface and 8 knots (15 km/h; 9.2 mph) underwater. On the surface, the Ro-100s had a range of 3,500 nautical miles (6,500 km; 4,000 mi) at 12 knots (22 km/h; 14 mph); submerged, they had a range of 60 nmi (110 km; 69 mi) at 3 knots (5.6 km/h; 3.5 mph).

The boats were armed with four internal bow 53.3 cm (21.0 in) torpedo tubes and carried a total of eight torpedoes. They were also armed with two single mounts for 25 mm (1 in) Type 96 anti-aircraft guns or a single 76.2 mm (3.00 in) L/40 AA gun.

== Construction and commissioning ==
Ro-115 was laid down as Submarine No. 406 on 12 October 1942 by Kawasaki at Kobe, Japan. She had been renamed Ro-115 by the time she was launched on 19 June 1943. She was completed and commissioned on 30 November 1943.

== Service history ==
=== November 1943–March 1944 ===
Upon commissioning, Ro-115 was attached to the Yokosuka Naval District and was assigned to Submarine Squadron 11 in the 6th Fleet for workups. On 10 March 1944, she was reassigned to Submarine Division 51 in Submarine Squadron 7 in the 6th Fleet. On 11 March 1944 she departed Kure, Japan, bound for Truk, which she reached on 22 March 1944.

=== First war patrol ===
On 28 March 1944, Ro-115 departed Truk to begin her first war patrol, assigned a patrol area in the Pacific Ocean west of Jaluit Atoll. The patrol was uneventful, and she returned to Truk on 18 April 1944. She sortied the same day to intercept an Allied task force Japanese forces had reported, but did not find it, and again returned to Truk on 19 April 1944.

=== Supply mission and second war patrol ===
Ro-115 departed Truk on 19 May 1944 to carry supplies to Wewak, New Guinea, in support of Japanese forces fighting in the New Guinea campaign. After calling at Wewak on 27 May 1944 and unloading her cargo, she got back underway the same day and proceeded to Palau, where she arrived on 3 June 1944 to deliver secret Imperial Japanese Army documents including codebooks.

On 7 June 1944, Ro-115 put to sea from Palau to begin her second war patrol, with orders to join a submarine patrol line north of New Ireland. On 13 June 1944 the Combined Fleet activated Operation A-Go for the defense of the Mariana Islands, and that day the commander-in-chief of the 6th Fleet, Vice Admiral Takeo Takagi, ordered all available submarines to deploy east of the Marianas. On 14 June 1944, Ro-115 received orders to proceed at flank speed to a new patrol area south of Guam.

The Battle of Saipan began with U.S. landings on Saipan on 15 June 1944. On 16 June 1944, Ro-115 was ordered to join Patrol Unit C along with the submarines Ro-113, Ro-116, and Ro-117. Ro-115 specifically was directed to patrol in the Philippine Sea northwest of Rota in the Marianas. She was 550 nautical miles (1,020 km; 630 mi) northwest of Rota on 19 June 1944 when she sighted two groups of United States Navy aircraft carriers and their escorts, and at 18:07 Japan Standard Time she fired four torpedoes at what her commanding officer described as a "Saratoga-class" aircraft carrier, but they all missed. The escorts subjected her to a brief counterattack with depth charges, but she escaped unscathed and received orders to return to Truk, where she arrived on 27 June 1944.

=== July–October 1944 ===
On 7 July 1944, Ro-115 left Truk and set course for Yokosuka, Japan, arriving there on 17 July 1944. On 10 August 1944, she departed Yokosuka bound for Penang in Japanese-occupied British Malaya, from which she was to conduct operations in the Indian Ocean. During her voyage to Penang, Submarine Division 51 was disbanded on 15 August 1944 and she and Ro-113 were reassigned to Submarine Squadron 8 at Penang.

=== Third war patrol ===
Ro-115 began her third war patrol on 25 October 1944, tasked with attacking Allied shipping in the Bay of Bengal. Based on traffic analysis of Japanese signals, Fleet Radio Unit, Melbourne (FRUMEL), an Allied signals intelligence unit headquartered at Melbourne, Australia, reported that an Allied aircraft had attacked Ro-115 on 28 October 1944 at 15°28′N 090°15′E and might have sunk her, but FRUMEL revised its analysis and reported correctly on 6 November 1944 that Ro-115 remained active. Ro-115 found no targets during her patrol and returned to Penang on 8 November 1944.

=== Fourth war patrol ===
Ro-115 began her fourth war patrol on 7 December 1944, departing Penang at 17:00 local time, again bound for the Bay of Bengal to patrol in the waters off Madras, India. Her patrol passed quietly, and she returned to Penang on 28 December 1944.

=== Fifth war patrol ===
Ro-115 got underway from Penang on 19 January 1945, called at Singapore from 21 to 22 January 1945, and then began her fifth war patrol, setting course for a patrol area in the South China Sea west of Luzon in the Philippine Islands. After her departure from Singapore, the Japanese never heard from her again.

=== Loss ===
At 19:55 on 31 January 1945, the U.S. Navy light cruiser USS Boise (CL-47) was off Mindoro 125 nautical miles (232 km; 144 mi) southwest of Manila when she detected a surface contact on radar. The destroyer USS Bell (DD-587) then also gained radar contact on the vessel at a range of 9,250 yards (8,460 m). Bell and the destroyer USS O'Bannon (DD-450) closed to investigate, and the target disappeared from radar, indicating a submerging submarine. They soon detected the submarine on sonar and made unsuccessful depth-charge attacks before losing contact. As the destroyer escort USS Ulvert M. Moore (DE-442) headed for the scene to join the hunt, Bell regained sonar contact on the submarine and made another depth-charge attack, which resulted in an oil slick appearing on the surface.

At 21:22 the destroyer USS Jenkins (DD-447) relieved Bell on the scene. An hour later, Ulvert M. Moore launched the first of five Hedgehog attacks she made, and her final barrage of Hedgehog projectiles sank the submarine at 00:15 on 1 February 1945 at either 13°20′N 119°20′E, according to U.S. Navy historians, or 15°03′N 119°07′E, according to Ulvert M. Moore′s deck log.

The submarine Ulvert M. Moore sank probably was Ro-115. On 3 February 1945, the 6th Fleet ordered her to put into port at Takao, Formosa, by no later than 6–8 February, and on 4 February 1945 she and the submarines Ro-46, Ro-112, and Ro-113 were ordered to unload all of their deck gun ammunition and reserve torpedoes at Takao and then proceed to Batulinao on the north coast of Luzon to rescue Imperial Japanese Navy Air Service pilots stranded in the Aparri area of northern Luzon. Ro-115 never acknowledged any of the orders, and FRUMEL reported on 16 February 1945 that Japanese messages indicated that Ro-115 still had not arrived at Takao to unload her ammunition and torpedoes.

Despite their inability to contact Ro-115, the Japanese reassigned her to Submarine Division 34 on 20 February 1945. On 21 February 1945, however, the Imperial Japanese Navy declared her to be presumed lost off the Philippine Islands with all 59 men on board. The Japanese struck her from the Navy list on 10 May 1945.

An alternative account of Ro-115′s fate holds that she was among the Japanese submarines that the U.S. Navy submarine USS Batfish (SS-310) sank off Luzon between 10 and 13 February 1945. However, Ro-115 never acknowledged the messages ordering her to conduct her rescue mission at Batulinao and never made port at Takao to unload her ammunition and torpedoes to make room to embark the stranded pilots, and no Japanese messages report her arriving on the coast of Luzon.
