= Takeo Takagi =

Japanese admiral

- 高木 武雄
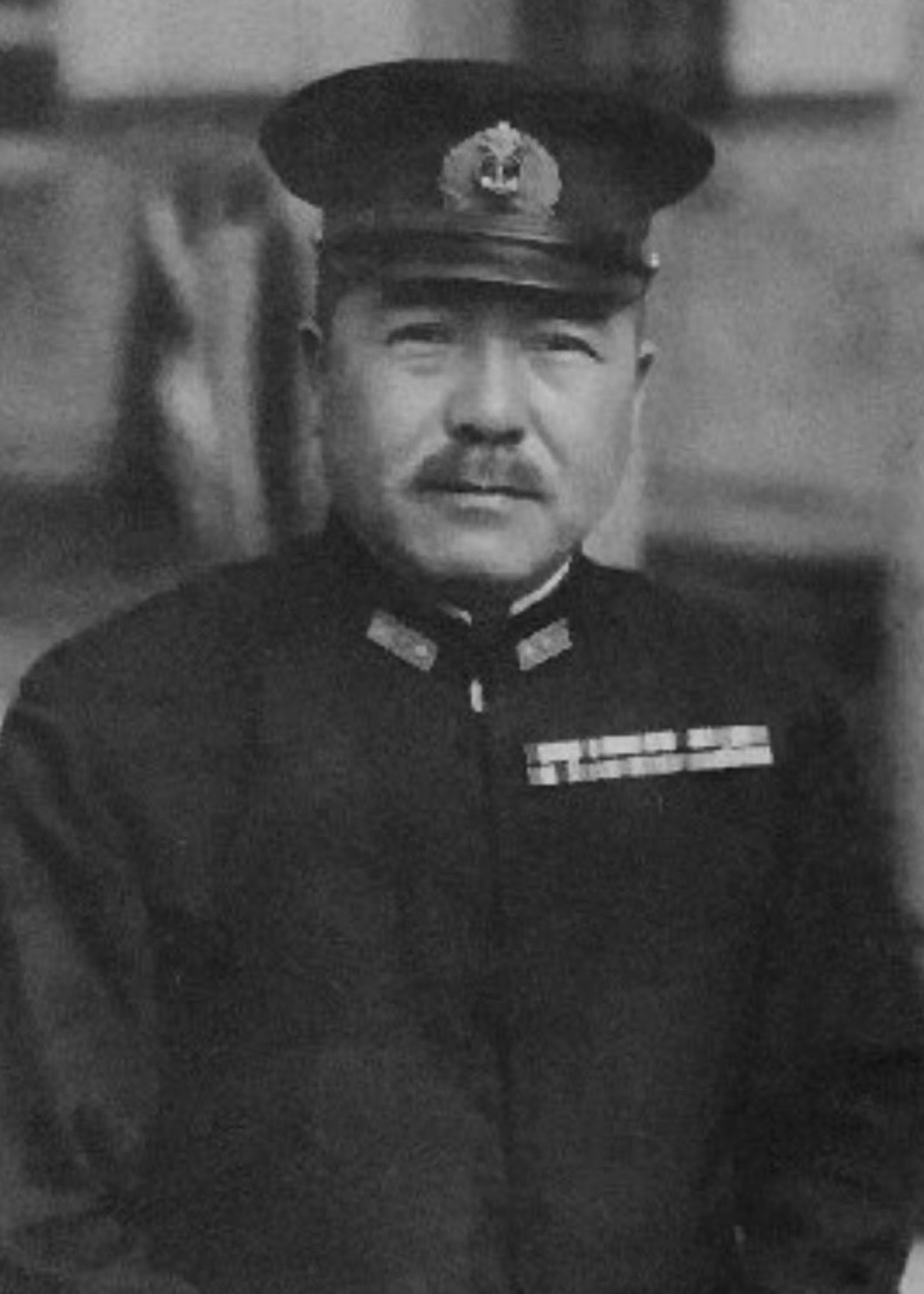
- Born: January 25, 1892; Iwaki, Fukushima, Japan
- Died: July 8, 1944 (aged 52); Saipan, Northern Marianas Islands
- Military career
- Allegiance: Empire of Japan
- Branch: Imperial Japanese Navy
- Service years: 1911–1944
- Rank: Admiral (posthumous)
- Commands: Nagara, Takao, Mutsu; 2nd NGS Division Mobilization, 5th Cruiser Division, Carrier Strike Force, Mako Guard District, Takao Guard District, IJN 6th Fleet
- Conflicts: World War II; Battle of the Philippines; Battle of the Java Sea; Battle of the Coral Sea; Battle of Saipan †
- Awards: Order of the Rising Sun (2nd class); Order of the Rising Sun (4th class); Order of the Golden Kite (2nd class)

Takeo Takagi (高木 武雄, Takagi Takeo; 25 January 1892 – 8 July 1944) was an admiral in the Imperial Japanese Navy during World War II. He was the commander of the IJN 6th Fleet, which oversaw the deployment of all submarines.

== Biography ==
Takagi was a native of Iwaki city, Fukushima prefecture. He was a graduate of the 39th class of the Imperial Japanese Naval Academy, ranking 17th of 148 cadets in 1911. As a midshipman, he served on the cruiser Aso and battleship Shikishima, and after his commissioning as ensign, on the cruiser Asama and battleship Kawachi.

As a lieutenant, he served on submarine SS-15, and following advanced coursework in navigation and in torpedo warfare, he became executive officer and then captain of the submarine SS-24. After graduation from Naval Staff College in 1923, he was promoted to lieutenant commander, and assumed command of the submarine Ro-28, followed by Ro-68 in 1926. He was promoted to commander in 1928, and held a number of staff positions. He was sent to the United States and Europe in 1931, and promoted to captain in 1932.

In 1933, Takagi was assigned command of the cruiser Nagara, followed by Takao in 1936 and the battleship Mutsu in 1937. Takagi was promoted to rear admiral on 15 November 1938, and was Chief of the 2nd Section of the Imperial Japanese Navy General Staff in 1939.

At the start of the Pacific War, Takagi was commanding the naval forces supporting the invasion of the Philippine Islands in late 1941, Takagi headed the task force covering the Java landings in Dutch East Indies. He was senior Japanese commander in the Battle of the Java Sea, sinking two cruisers and three destroyers in exchange for damage to a single Japanese destroyer.

Takagi was promoted to vice admiral on 1 May 1942. He was commander of the carrier task force (Shōkaku and Zuikaku) in "Operation Mo". Thus he was also senior Japanese commander at the Battle of the Coral Sea. He commanded the 5th Cruiser Division during the Battle of Midway.

In November 1942, Takagi was reassigned to be commander of the Mako Guard District. In April 1943, The Guard District moved to Takao, Taiwan and Takagi was assigned to be commander of the renamed Takao Guard District. On 21 June 1943, he was again given a front line assignment, when he was made commander of the IJN 6th Fleet (submarines), based in the Mariana Islands.

Takagi was killed in action during the Battle of Saipan in 1944. Missing after the battle, it is not clear whether he committed suicide or died trying to escape in a submarine. He was posthumously promoted to full admiral.
