= Charles A. Willoughby =

U.S. Army general and intelligence officer

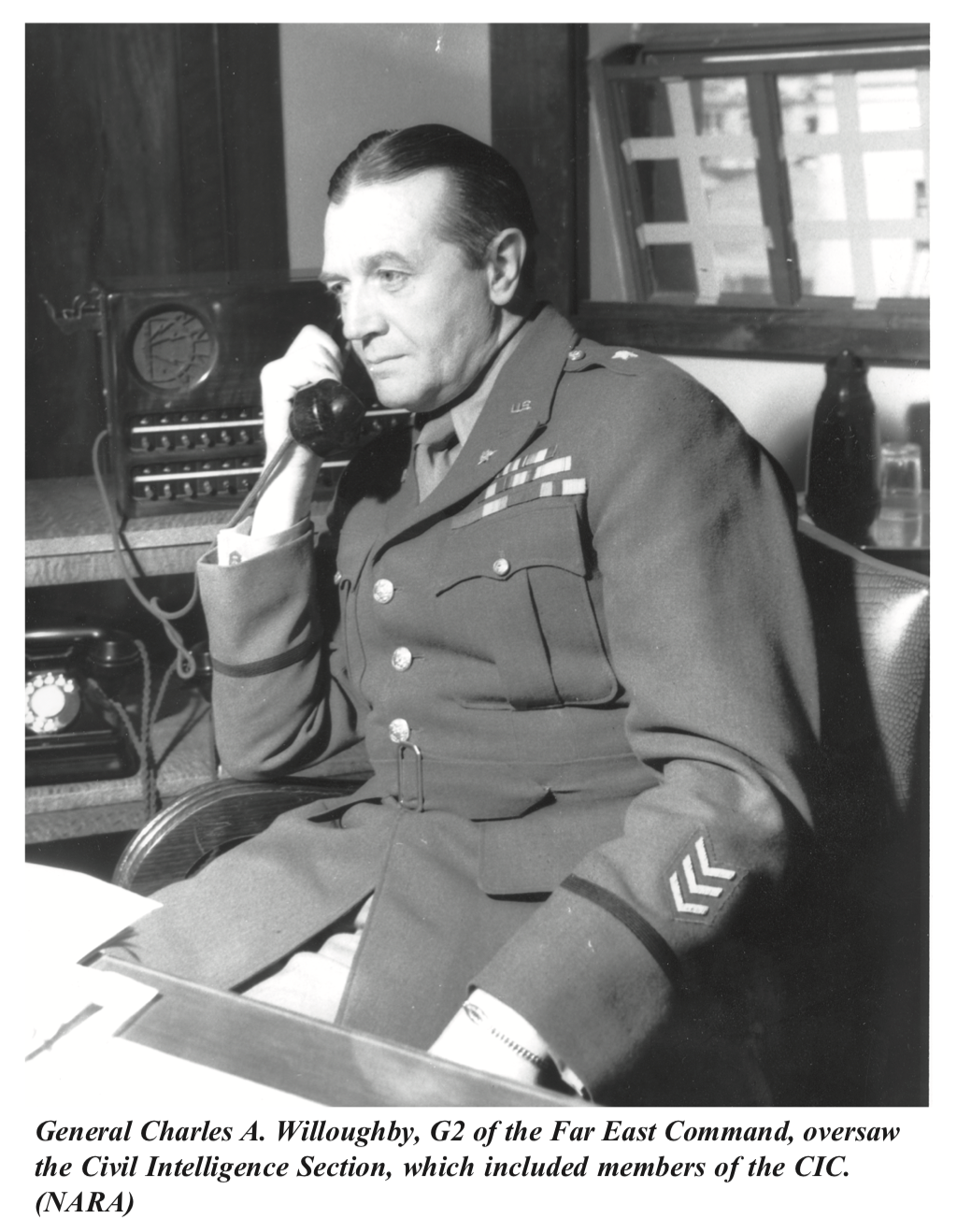
- Charles Andrew Willoughby
- Born: Adolf Karl Weidenbach; 8 March 1892; Heidelberg, German Empire
- Died: 25 October 1972 (aged 80); Naples, Florida
- Burial place: Arlington National Cemetery
- Military career
- Allegiance: United States
- Branch: United States Army
- Service years: 1910–1951
- Rank: Major General
- Nickname: Sir Charles
- Service number: O-4615
- Conflicts: Border War; World War I; World War II; Philippines campaign (1941–1942); New Guinea campaign; Philippines campaign (1944–1945); Occupation of Japan; Korean War
- Awards: Distinguished Service Cross; Distinguished Service Medal (3); Silver Star

Charles Andrew Willoughby (8 March 1892 – 25 October 1972) was a major general in the U.S. Army who was General of the Army Douglas MacArthur's chief of military intelligence during World War II and the Korean War.

An immigrant from Germany who graduated from Gettysburg College in 1913, Willoughby was commissioned in the infantry in August 1916 under the name Adolph Charles Weidenbach. He served in France in World War I in the American Expeditionary Force with the 1st Infantry Division and the United States Army Air Service as an instructor at the American Aviation School at Issoudon. In May 1918 he was transferred to Washington, D.C., where he helped organise the United States' first airmail delivery service, and changed his name to Charles Andrew Willoughby.

After the war, Willoughby returned to the infantry as a company and battalion commander in the 24th Infantry, one of the two U.S. Army's two African-American regiments, and the Puerto-Rican 65th Infantry. Fluent in English, Spanish, German and French (and later Japanese), he then became a military attaché, and served at the American legations in Caracas, Venezuela, Bogotá, Colombia, and Quito, Ecuador.

During and after World War II Willoughby was the assistant chief of staff for intelligence (G-2) on MacArthur's United States Army Forces in the Far East (USAFFE) staff during the 1941–1942 Philippines campaign, during which he was awarded the Distinguished Service Cross for valor. He accompanied Douglas MacArthur's escape from the Philippines in PT boats in March 1942, and served as G-2 with General Headquarters (GHQ) Southwest Pacific Area in Australia, New Guinea and the Philippines. In August 1945, he met the Japanese surrender delegation headed by Lieutenant General Torashirō Kawabe to negotiate the details of the Occupation of Japan.

Willoughby continued to serve MacArthur as G-2 at GHQ of the Supreme Commander for the Allied Powers (SCAP) and the Far East Command (FECOM). Willoughby's contribution during the Korean War is subject to significant controversy, due to the failure to anticipate the outbreak of the war and the Chinese intervention in it. After MacArthur was recalled in April 1951, he chose to retire from the Army in September. He was the editor of the Foreign Intelligence Digest until 1961, and published a book on MacArthur's campaigns in the Pacific.

== Early life and education ==
Willoughby claimed to have been born on 8 March 1892, in Heidelberg, Germany, as Adolph Karl Weidenbach, the son of Baron T. Tscheppe-Weidenbach and wife Emma Willoughby Tscheppe-Weidenbach of Baltimore, Maryland. This was disputed by Frank Kluckhohn of The Reporter (New York Journal) in 1952, and there remains uncertainty as to both his birth name and lineage. Erich Tülff von Tschepe und Weidenbach (whose name was spelt with only one "p") did not have the title of "Freiherr" and did not receive letters patent from Kaiser Wilhelm II granting him the use of the surname "von Tschepe und Weidenbach" until 1913. He had five children, but none of them were Adolph Karl Weidenbach or born in 1892. The German news magazine Der Spiegel found an 8 March 1892 entry in the Heidelberg registry recording the birth of Adolf August Weidenbach, with ropemaker August Weidenbach as father and Emma, née Langhäuser.

He emigrated from Germany to the U.S. in 1910, and on 10 October 1910 he enlisted in the United States Army, where he served with Company K of the 5th Infantry, initially as a private, later rising to the rank of sergeant. He was honorably discharged from the army on 9 October 1913. He then entered Gettysburg College as a senior in 1913 based on his attestations of three years of attendance at the University of Heidelberg and the Sorbonne in Paris before he emigrated to the United States. It is disputed whether he actually did attend either European university, as he would have had to do so at an unusually young age. He graduated with a Bachelor of Arts degree in 1914, and became a language teacher at the Howe School, a private girls' school in Howe, Indiana, and Racine College in Racine, Wisconsin. He began studying for a Master of Arts degree at the University of Kansas in Lawrence, Kansas.

== World War I ==
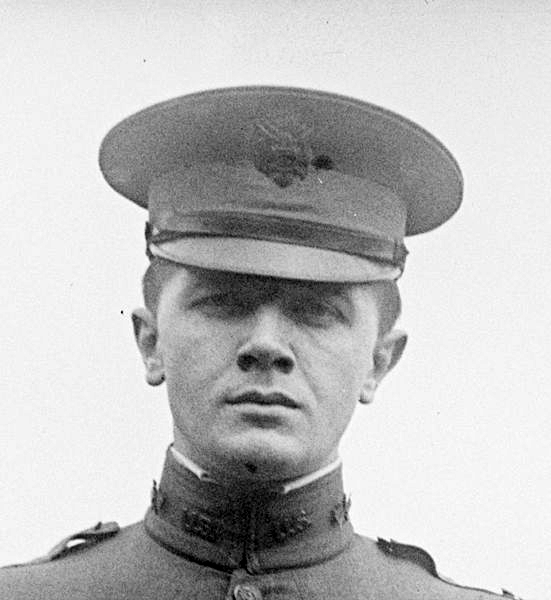
Willoughby in 1918

After graduation from Gettysburg College, he was commissioned a major in the Officers' Volunteer Reserve Corps of the U.S. Army in May 1914. He spent three months teaching German and military studies at various prep-schools in the United States. In August 1916, under the name Adolph Charles Weidenbach, he vacated his position in the reserve to accept a Regular Army commission as a second lieutenant in the infantry on 27 November 1916, was promoted to first lieutenant on the same day. He was assigned to the 35th Infantry, at Nogales, Arizona, which patrolled the Mexican border during the Mexican Expedition.

He was promoted to captain on 30 June 1917, serving initially with the 16th Infantry Regiment, part of the 1st Infantry Division, at Fort Bliss, Texas, and served in France with the American Expeditionary Force (AEF). In 1918, he transferred to the United States Army Air Service, and was trained as a pilot by the French military, flying SPAD and Nieuport fighters. He then became an instructor at the American Aviation School at Issoudon, where he served as adjutant to Major Carl Spaatz. In May 1918 he was transferred to the Aviation Section in the War Department in Washington, D.C., where he helped the Postmaster General, Albert S. Burleson, organise the United States' first airmail delivery service, from Washington, D.C., to Garden City, New York. He changed his name to Charles Andrew Willoughby, a loose translation of Weidenbach, the German for "willow brook".

== Between the wars ==
After the war ended, Willoughby did not remain in the Air Service, but returned to the infantry, and commanded demonstration machine gun units at the Infantry School at Fort Benning, Georgia. In October 1919 he joined the 24th Infantry (one of the U.S. Army's two African-American regiments), as a company and battalion commander, stationed at Columbus, New Mexico. He was then sent to San Juan, Puerto Rico, where he served as a company and battalion commander in the Puerto-Rican 65th Infantry from February 1921 to May 1923. While serving in Puerto Rico he married Juana Manuela Rodríguez in May 1923. They had a daughter, Olga Antonia (Toni), who was born on 25 December 1925. It was her second marriage, and he also acquired two stepchildren, a daughter and a son.

This was followed by temporary duty with the Military Intelligence Division at the War Department to prepare Willoughby for his next assignment, as a military attaché. His talent for languages made him a good choice for this role; he was fluent in English, Spanish, German, French, and later, Japanese. Over the next five years he served at the American legations in Caracas, Venezuela, Bogotá, Colombia, and Quito, Ecuador. He received awards from the governments of Venezuela and Ecuador, and the Order of Saints Maurice and Lazarus from Benito Mussolini's Italian government for his assistance to Italian airlines in South America. Willoughby was an admirer of Mussolini, writing that "Historical judgment, freed from the emotional haze of the moment, will credit Mussolini with wiping out a memory of defeat by re-establishing the traditional military supremacy of the white race". While serving as an attaché, he wrote an article, "A Great Patriotic Shrine, the House of Bolivar", that was published in the Bulletin of the Pan-American Union.

Writing about the Rif War in 1926, Willoughby ventured the opinion that:

With the spread of democratic doctrines, half-civilized people have promptly taken advantage of the magic formula of self-determination and flaunt it with great effect. Every colonial struggle becomes a struggle for "freedom"; every unwashed savage becomes a potential hero of a war for independence... From China to Mexico, the conception of government by the people, with the observance of certain outwardly republican forms, has repeatedly become a cloak for absolute anarchy, hopeless administrative mismanagement, or civil war.

Willoughby returned to the United States in May 1927, where he was stationed at Fort D. A. Russell in Wyoming. He was promoted to major on 6 March 1928. In September he attended the Advanced Course at the Infantry School at Fort Benning. He graduated in June 1920, but remained at Fort Benning, where he wrote a history of the Infantry School. In August 1929 he entered the United States Army Command and General Staff College at Fort Leavenworth, Kansas. He graduated in June 1931, but remained as an instructor. He taught courses on military history and military intelligence, and edited the Command and General Staff School Quarterly. In 1931, he published a 68-page monograph on The Economic and Military Participation of the United States in the World War, 1917–1918.

Willoughby was also the editor of the Review of Current Military Literature (which became Quarterly Review of Military Literature in September 1932, and is today the Military Review), from July 1932 to May 1934. Although not the first editor of the journal, he was the first whose name appeared on the masthead. He then attended the Army War College in Washington, D.C. After graduation in July 1936, he returned to the Infantry School at Fort Benning as an instructor, and was promoted to lieutenant colonel on 1 June 1938. He wrote a text book for the course at Leavenworth, Maneuver in War, which was published in 1939. In February 1940, he briefly served in New York City with the War Department's Military Dictionary Project, which published a series of foreign language dictionaries for military use.

== World War II and the occupation of Japan ==
=== Philippines campaign ===
In June 1940, Willoughby became the Assistant Chief of Staff (G-4), the staff officer responsible for military logistics, at the headquarters of the Philippine Department, based in Manila. As such, he oversaw work on the roads, depots and ports on Corregidor and Bataan that would be crucial to the defense of the Philippines. After the United States Army Forces in the Far East (USAFFE) was formed under General Douglas MacArthur on 26 July 1941, Willoughby became its Assistant Chief of Staff (G-2), the staff officer responsible for military intelligence, at USAFFE headquarters. He was promoted to colonel on 14 October 1941, and his appointment as G-2 became official on 12 November 1941. Fluent in Spanish, he frequented the Spanish Club in Manila, and became good friends with Andrés Soriano, a wealthy industrialist, who would later serve on MacArthur's staff.

In Maneuver in War, Willoughby had written:

Japan's strength is self-sufficiency in food; the masses are not likely to feel any pinch of hunger. Its weakness is lack in strategic raw materials: oil, scrap iron, copper, lead, nickel. An embargo on these vital items would not yield immediate results, since reserve stocks are undoubtedly available, but long-range pressure would be effective. Sanctions, however, are fraught with unpleasant consequences; they are not an easy half-way house between neutrality and war; it is hardly likely that the Japanese army and navy would bow to economic pressure and accept defeat without a struggle; it is far more probable that they would strike out for Netherlands-India, French Indo-China, the Philippines, Malaysia—any place within naval range which would provide oil, tin, rubber and iron.

This proved an accurate forecast: in response to American, British and Dutch economic sanctions, Japan attacked the Philippines on 8 December. In his appreciation sent to the War Department on 13 December, Willoughby predicted that the Japanese would soon land in Lingayen Gulf and advance on Manila. USAFFE staff moved to Corregidor on 24 December. On a personal reconnaissance mission on Bataan, Willoughby involved in an action with a company of the Philippine Constabulary for which he was awarded the Silver Star. His citation read:

For gallantry in action in the vicinity of Agloloma Bay, Bataan, Philippine Islands, on 24 January 1942. During an attack to expel an enemy landing party, Colonel Willoughby, who was engaged in a reconnaissance of the general area, voluntarily joined in an attack when he learned that the company commander had been wounded and the company was without an officer. This gallant officer assisted in reorganising stragglers, and in the face of heavy enemy small arms fire and mortar fire, demonstrated courage and leadership in proceeding through heavy jungle terrain to a position within twenty yards of the enemy line. After the initial attack, Colonel Willoughby disregarded enemy snipers in administering first aid to a wounded officer and assisted him to the rear. The example of courage and leadership displayed by this staff officer was a significant factor in the ultimate success of the attack.

Willoughby met Clare Boothe Luce when she arrived in the Philippines to profile MacArthur, they began affair. Luce would later describe Willoughby as "the one man that I could have run away with".

=== Southwest Pacific Area ===
Willoughby was one of the key staff officers who accompanied Douglas MacArthur's escape from the Philippines in PT boats in March 1942. On 19 April 1942 MacArthur announced the staff of his General Headquarters (GHQ), Southwest Pacific Area (SWPA), with Willoughby as his G-2. Willoughby was promoted to brigadier general on 20 June 1942. Two important Allied intelligence organizations were created that reported to Willoughby: the Allied Translator and Interpreter Section (ATIS), which translated captured documents and interrogated prisoners of war (POWs); the Allied Geographical Section (AGS), which prepared maps and terrain studies and handbooks. ATIS also gathered and published evidence of Japanese war crimes. By 11 May 1944 reports of beheadings, cannibalism and other atrocities had become so voluminous that Willoughby recommended that the Judge Advocate General of USAFFE develop procedures for crimes trials. Documents sometimes pertained to Japanese activities outside SWPA, and ATIS published a research report of Japanese biological warfare in July 1944.

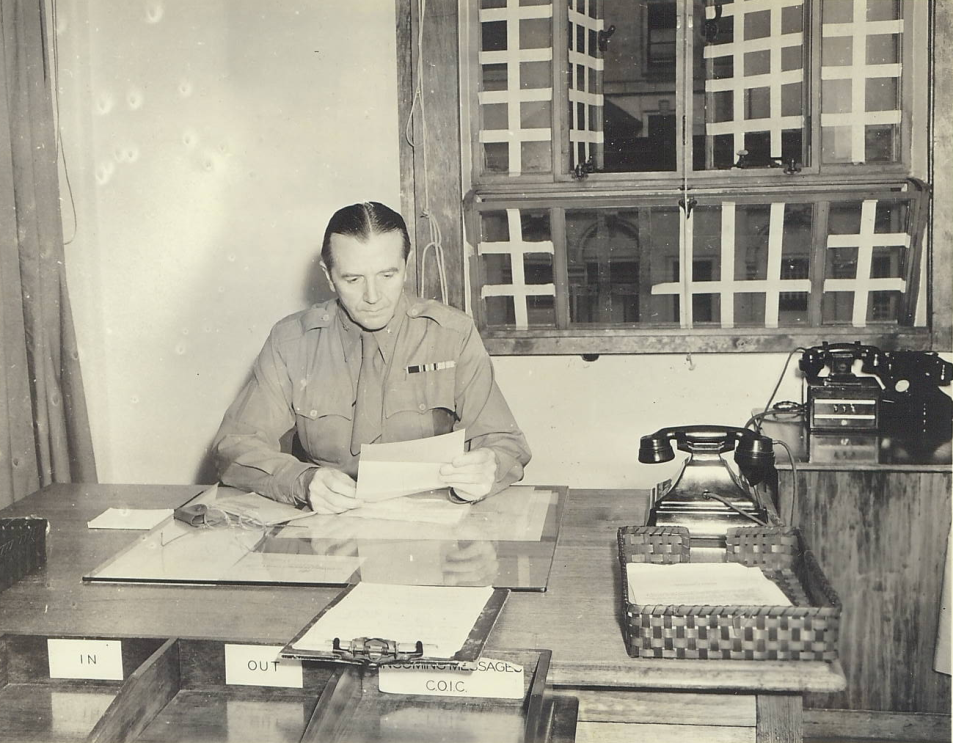
Willoughby at his desk in Australia

Another important task of the G-2 section was producing the Daily Intelligence Summary, which summarised recent intelligence and gave the G-2 section's estimation of the enemy's situation. There was also an order of battle section which built lists of Japanese units, their location and organization. There was a windfall in May 1943 when an official Japanese Register of Army Officers was captured. This 2,700-page document listed all its officers and their assignments, and was translated by the ATIS. MacArthur did not permit the Office of Strategic Services to operate in SWPA, as he already had a similar organization in the Allied Intelligence Bureau (AIB), and preferred to keep forces in the theatre under his own command.

Willoughby was not in charge of the Central Bureau, the cryptanalytic unit that provided Ultra intelligence. This was under the control of the Chief Signals Officer, Major General Spencer B. Akin, who outranked Willoughby. The Central Bureau sent a daily dump of Japanese radio traffic translated into English to Akin, who decided what should be shown to MacArthur. Summaries were then transmitted to agencies in SWPA, including Willoughby's G-2. As late as October 1944, Willoughby only received the delayed information summaries. It was his role to collate this with intelligence from other sources and prepare appreciations for MacArthur. Willoughby produced the Special Intelligence Bulletin, which was based on Ultra, with distribution limited to himself, MacArthur, Lieutenant General Richard K. Sutherland (MacArthur's chief of staff) and Stephen J. Chamberlin (G-3, officer in charge of operations). The US Navy had its own communications intelligence (comint) unit, the Fleet Radio Unit, Melbourne (FRUMEL), and intelligence from this source was shown to MacArthur, but he was not allowed to distribute it.

Intelligence officers could draw different conclusions based on the same information. In late April 1942, information from Ultra indicated a major Japanese operation was under way. Commander Edwin T. Layton the Pacific Fleet's intelligence officer, deduced that Port Moresby was the target, but Willoughby drew a different conclusion based on the same information; the presence of aircraft carriers indicated a target beyond the range of Japanese land-based aircraft, so he reported that an attack on the Australian coast or New Caledonia was more likely. As evidence mounted in May though, Willoughby reversed himself and agreed that Port Moresby was indeed the target. The Japanese were intercepted, resulting in the Battle of the Coral Sea. Soon afterwards Willoughby noted Japanese designs on Buna and Milne Bay, although discounted the possibility of a Japanese advance over the Kokoda Track. The similarity of Japanese and Allied plans suggested that the Japanese were reading Allied codes.

Willoughby was awarded the Distinguished Service Cross for the Papuan campaign. He citation read:

The President of the United States of America, authorized by Act of Congress July 9, 1918, takes pleasure in presenting the Distinguished Service Cross to Brigadier General Charles Andrew Willoughby (ASN: O-4615), United States Army, for extraordinary heroism in connection with military operations against an armed enemy, in action against enemy forces in New Guinea, during the Papuan Campaign, 23 July 1942, to 8 January 1943. As Chief of Intelligence, United States Army Forces in the Far East, General Willoughby displayed extraordinary courage, marked efficiency and precise execution of operations during the Papuan Campaign. His gallant leadership, intrepid actions, personal bravery and zealous devotion to duty exemplify the highest traditions of the military forces of the United States and reflect great credit upon himself and the United States Army.

There was a need to balance different sources of intelligence. On 23 February 1944, photo-reconnaissance aircraft flew low over Los Negros. They were not engaged by antiaircraft fire and saw no signs of activity. Willoughby rejected the contention of the Allied Air Forces commander, Lieutenant General George C. Kenney, that the islands had been evacuated, and reported, based on Ultra, an estimated 3,250 Japanese troops on the islands. Willoughby's assessment proved correct. An appreciation by Willoughby led to the substantial Japanese forces at Hansa Bay being bypassed in favor of landing at Aitape and Hollandia. But he was not always so accurate, and he grossly underestimated the size and capability of Japanese forces in the Wakde-Sarmi and on Biak.

Undercounting of Japanese forces, based on Ultra intelligence, continued to occur, due to a failure to locate large numbers of small logistical units. Willoughby clashed with the chief of staff of the Sixth Army, Brigadier General Clyde D. Eddleman over the number of Japanese troops on Luzon; Willoughby estimated 172,000 while Eddleman, based on the same data, reckoned there were 240,000. Both were too low; there were 287,000 Japanese troops on Luzon. As in the Admiralty Islands campaign, MacArthur chose to ignore evidence that conflicted with his operational plan. He privately told Eddleman that there were only three great intelligence officers in history, and Willoughby was not one of them. However, MacArthur may have told Willoughby ten minutes later that Sixth Army intelligence was incompetent, and Colonel Laurence E. Bunker recalled MacArthur later telling the Secretary of the Army that "Willoughby was the finest G-2 officer he had encountered in his fifty-odd years of service in the Army, and he was so much the number one that he wouldn't know whom to name the number two."

Willoughby, who was promoted to major general on 17 March 1945, habitually conducted himself as a European aristocrat, clicking his heels and bowing when introduced to someone, and kissing women's hands. He still spoke with a slight German accent. He wore tailored uniforms, and sometimes a monocle. Behind his back, staff officers called him "Baron von Willoughby", "Sir Charles" or "Bonnie Prince Charles". Raymond D. Tarbuck, a naval officer on the GHQ staff, characterised Willoughby as "a Prussian type. All he needed was a spiked helmet." But another staff officer considered that there was "more of von Stroheim than von Rundstedt about him".

== Occupation of Japan ==
At Nichols Field near Manila on 16 August 1945, Willoughby met the Japanese surrender delegation headed by Lieutenant General Torashirō Kawabe to negotiate the details of the Occupation of Japan. The talks were conducted in German. Willoughby became G-2 at GHQ of the Supreme Commander for the Allied Powers (SCAP). He therefore had two intelligence staffs: the G-2 section of the Far East Command (FECOM), which concentrated on military intelligence in East Asia, and the G-2 section of SCAP, which was responsible for civic intelligence and counter intelligence in Japan, and for enforcing SCAPIN-33 (Press code for Japan) for censorship of the Japanese press. Both staffs were decimated by post-war demobilization and budget cuts. Most of the available resources were devoted to Japan.

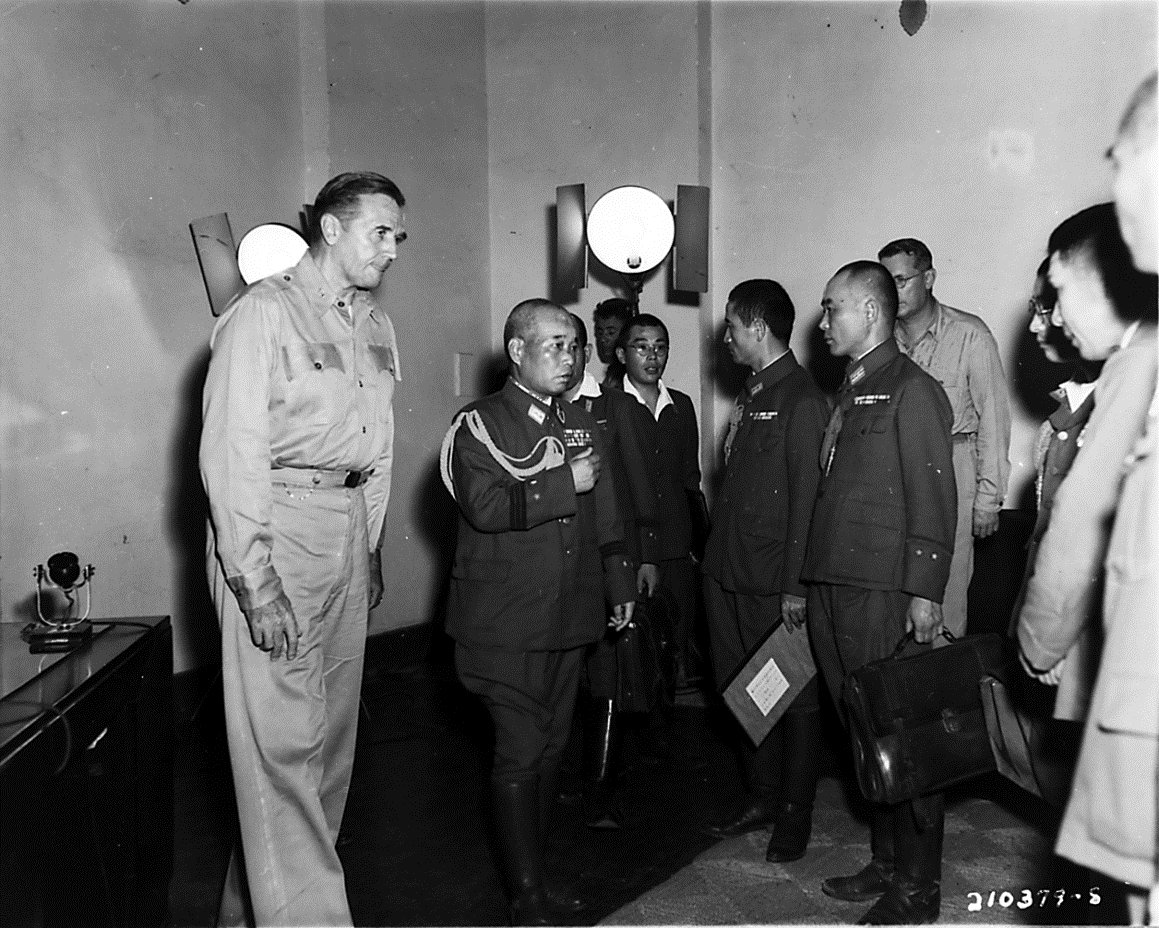
Willoughby with members of the Japanese surrender arrangement delegation. Lieutenant General Torashirō Kawabe stands next to him.

Willoughby married Marie Antionette de Becker, who had been held as an internee in the Santo Tomas Internment Camp during the war. She was the sister of Edith Frances de Becker Sebald, who was married to William J. Sebald, MacArthur's political advisor. Willoughby also had a Japanese mistress, Araki Mitsuko, the wife of a former Tokyo Imperial University professor, who was an important source of information on GHQ for the Japanese government.

Many of the 1.5 million Japanese soldiers returning from captivity in the Soviet Union were suspected of Communist sympathies, but demobilization reduced ATIS to a fraction of its former self, and there were not enough linguists to process more than a small fraction of them. Eventually, 9,000 were extensively interrogated, but only the most important in more than a cursory fashion. Willoughby established a Civil Intelligence Section to weed out reactionaries and persons opposed to the democratization of Japan. It controlled the 441st Counter Intelligence Corps Detachment, which looked out for spies and subversive activities.

Willoughby alleged that an American, Agnes Smedley, was a member of Richard Sorge's Soviet spy ring that operated in China and Japan before and during the war. He tracked down information on Smedley, which he presented to the House Un-American Activities Committee in 1951. He eventually wrote a book on the spy ring, Shanghai Conspiracy, which was published in 1952. He also suspected Beate Sirota Gordon, who helped write the Constitution of Japan, of being connected to Sorge. The G-2 section compiled extensive files on "Leftist infiltration in SCAP", and Willoughby went out of his way to track and discredit thinkers left of himself. He investigated New Dealers in Charles Louis Kades's Government Section, an endeavor that included blacklisting economist Eleanor Hadley such that she could not obtain a steady government job in the United States for seventeen years.

Kawabe and Lieutenant General Seizo Arisue, the former chief of intelligence at Imperial General Headquarters, led a clandestine intelligence network Willoughby established to gather intelligence on the Japanese Communist Party, but it was penetrated by Communist Chinese intelligence. Arisue recruited some 200 former Japanese Army officers, including Masanobu Tsuji and Takushiro Hattori, to assist American historian Gordon Prange with his work on the history of the campaigns in the Southwest Pacific. Tsuji became involved with the recruitment of former Japanese Army personnel to assist Nationalist Chinese on Taiwan as part of Willoughby's plans for a Nationalist Chinese invasion of mainland China. The plans were shelved when it became clear that the preparations had been detected by the Communist Chinese. A Central Intelligence Agency (CIA) report described Hattori and Tsuji as "extremely irresponsible", and characterized Tsuji as "the type of man who, given the chance, would start World War III without any misgivings."

By July 1952, Tsuji had become convinced that cooperation with the Americans was the best path to Japanese rearmament, but Hattori had not. He hatched a plot to assassinate then-prime minister Shigeru Yoshida and replace him with Ichirō Hatoyama, who was much more hawkish and eager to re-militarize Japan. Tsuji persuaded Hattori to hold off, although he continued to plot assassinations of other officials. G-2 funding of the group ended in 1952 in anticipation of the end of the occupation, and in April Hattori was informed that his position as chief of the Historical Records Department in G-2 would be terminated. Tsuji was elected to the National Diet in 1952, and Hatoyama eventually replaced Yoshida in 1954.

Willoughby edited a history of MacArthur's Pacific campaigns, which was published in 1966 as The Reports of General MacArthur in four volumes. He also edited a ten-volume Intelligence Series on the activities of G-2 in SWPA and SCAP. In 1947, he arranged for two scientists from Fort Detrick, Maryland, Edwin Hill and Joseph Victor, to interview Shirō Ishii about biological warfare information gathered by Unit 731, a covert biological and chemical warfare research and development unit of the Imperial Japanese Army that undertook lethal human experimentation in China.

== Korean War ==
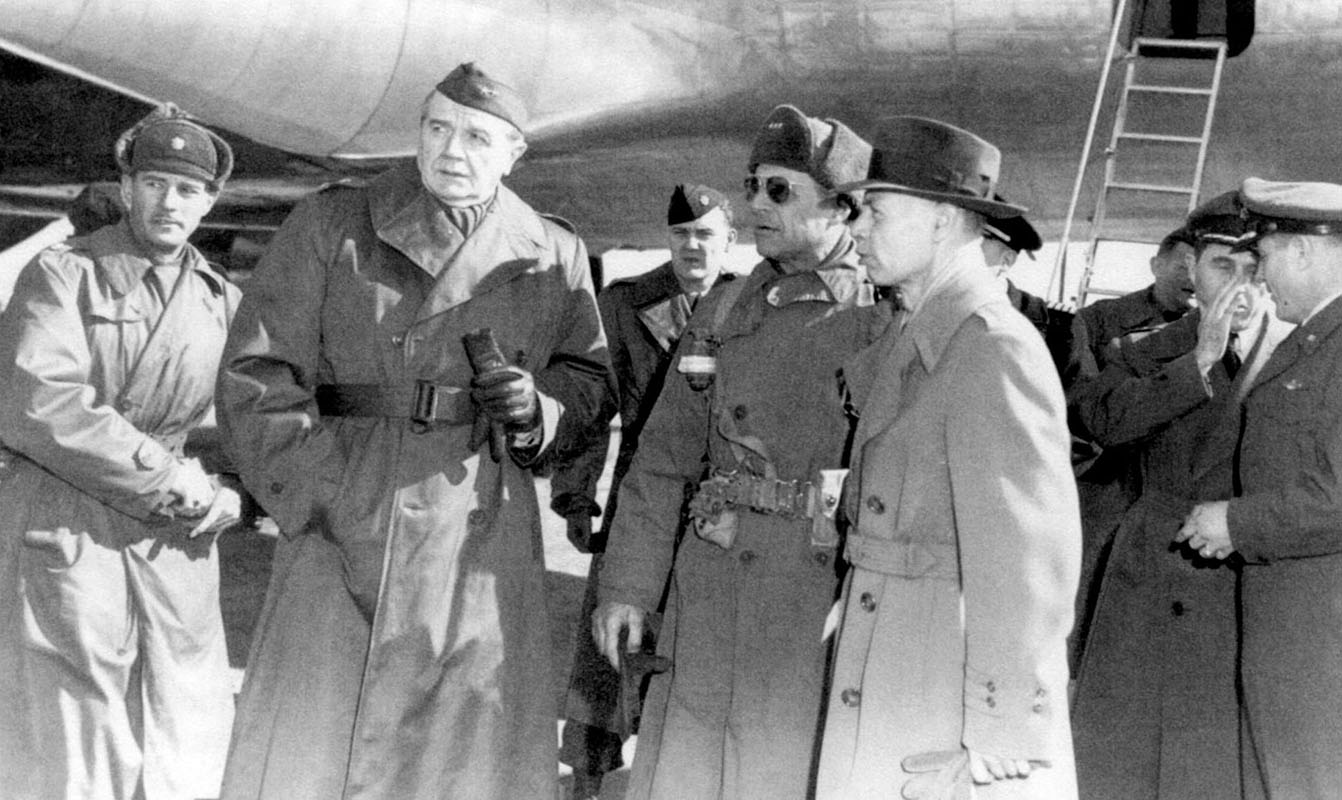
Willoughby (second from left) confers with Lieutenant General Matthew B. Ridgway (center) and CIA Director Walter B. Smith (right) in Korea In mid-January 1951

Willoughby's contribution during the Korean War is subject to significant controversy. A failure was not anticipating the outbreak of the war on 25 June 1950. Matthew Aid concluded that:

Even if greater Comint collection resources had been available in the Far East, and if a portion had been devoted to North Korea, it is still unlikely that Comint would have picked up any indications of North Korea's intentions to invade given the North Korean government and military's penchant for transmitting virtually all sensitive information, including sensitive diplomatic messages, by telegraph, landline telephone circuits or by couriers, which of course American Comint units in Japan and elsewhere could not intercept.

Several sources insist that Willoughby intentionally distorted, if not out and out suppressed, intelligence estimates that showed the Chinese were massing at the Yalu River. He allegedly did so in order to better support MacArthur's (mistaken) assertion that the Chinese would never cross the Yalu, and thus allow MacArthur a freer hand in his drive to the Yalu. Lieutenant Colonel John Chiles, the X Corps G-3, claimed that:

MacArthur did not want the Chinese to enter the war in Korea. Anything MacArthur wanted, Willoughby produced intelligence for... In this case Willoughby falsified the intelligence reports... He should have gone to jail.

Willoughby flew to X Corps headquarters in Korea to interrogate sixteen Chinese prisoners captured by X Corps between 26 and 29 October 1950. This allowed Willoughby to identify their regiment, but he remained skeptical about the number of Chinese troops were in Korea. Not until 5 November did he concede that there were substantial Chinese forces in Korea, and that they were capable of conducting large-scale operations. Willoughby did not rely on any single source, but attempted to verify information with reports from multiple sources. In this case, communications intelligence and imagery intelligence from aerial photography could not confirm the reports coming from human intelligence. The Chinese were aware of American use of these sources, and tried to neutralize them with countermeasures such as camouflage, troop movements by night over mountain roads, and radio silence.

MacArthur was relieved of his command on 11 April 1951 and replaced by Lieutenant General Matthew B. Ridgway. Willoughby remained as G-2 of FECOM. Although Ridgway wanted him to stay on Willoughby asked to return to the United States in June. He explained to the Director of Central Intelligence, Walter B. Smith, that this was motivated by a case of arthritis of the spine. The 3,175th and final issue of the Daily Intelligence Summary was dedicated to him. Willoughby officially retired from the Army on 1 September 1951.

== Retirement, death and legacy ==
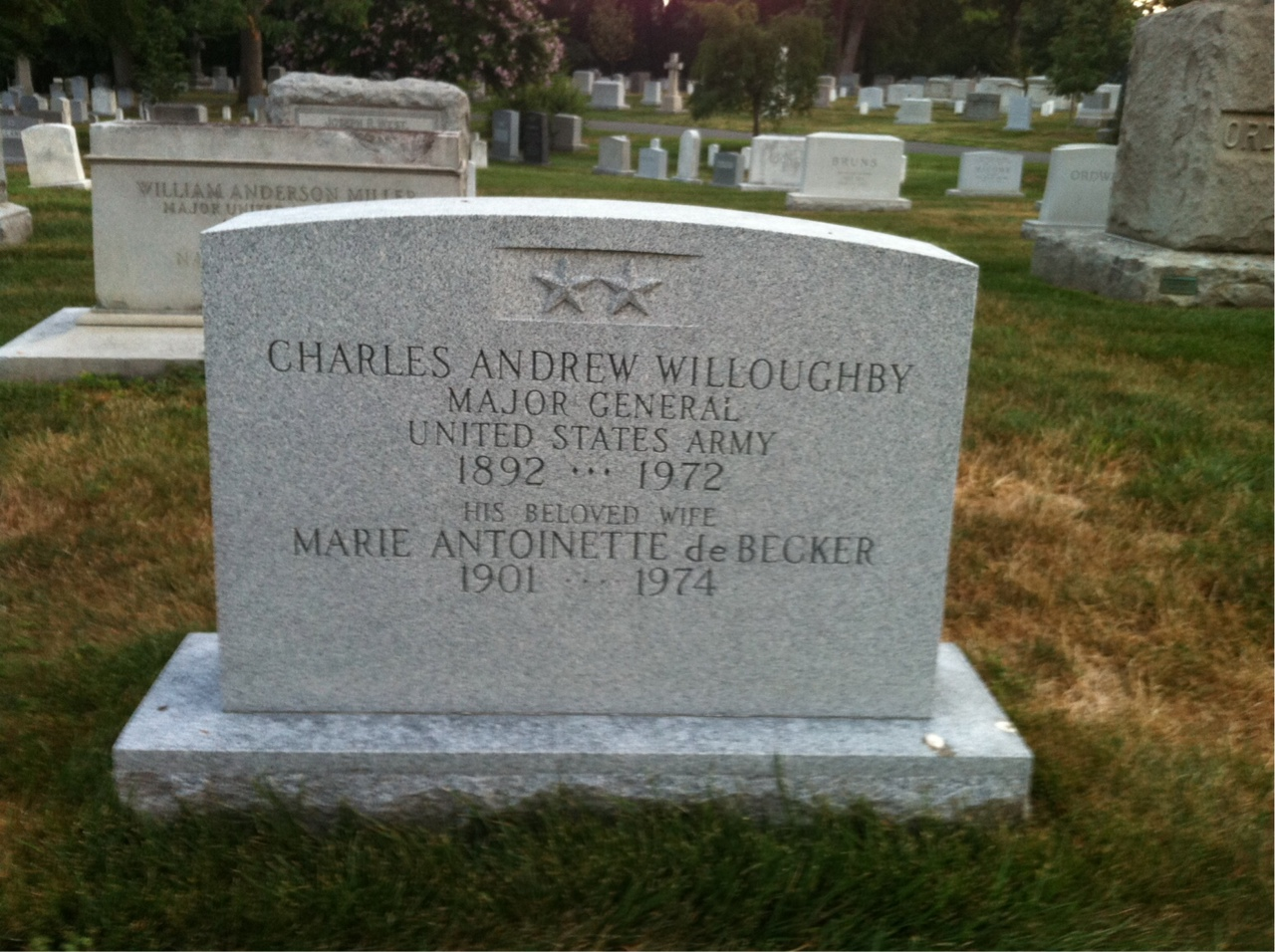
Grave in Arlington National Cemetery

In January 1953 he was interviewed by Henry Hazlitt and William Bradford Huie for an episode of CBS's Longines Chronoscope talk show, when he advocated friendly ties between America and Franco's Spain, contrasting the Christian anti-communist Franco with communist atheists. This, he argued, would help strengthen the Southern flank of NATO.

Soon after he retired from the Army, Willoughby became the editor of the Foreign Intelligence Digest, a position he held until 1961. In addition, he wrote articles for The American Mercury. He worked with Texas oil tycoon H. L. Hunt on the International Committee for the Defence of Christian Culture, an extreme right organization that had connections to anti-communist groups, and was the organization's national executive secretary for a time. Willoughby was a member of the board of directors for the National Economic Council, a far-right antisemitic group that opposed the civil rights movement and linked it to communism. He was also a member of the American Security Council, an anti-communist organization founded in 1955, whose "Cold War Victory Advisory Committee" he served on. In addition, he was on the National Advisory Board of Young Americans for Freedom. In 1962 he sat on the "Co-ordination of Conservative Efforts" committee of Billy James Hargis' Anti-Communist Liaison organization.

MacArthur affectionately referred to him as "my pet fascist." Willoughby's "vitriolic, paranoid, and frequently fantastic" notes included antisemitic insults towards Beate Sirota Gordon, who helped write the Constitution of Japan. During World War II MacArthur said, "There have been three great intelligence officers in history. Mine is not one of them." John Ferris, in his 2007 book Intelligence and Strategy, calls this an "understatement" and calls Willoughby a "candidate for one of the three worst intelligence officers of the Second World War" (p. 261).

Willoughby began writing a book about the work of the G-2 section during World War II, but his publisher, McGraw-Hill, wanted a biography of MacArthur, as it was felt that this would sell well. To turn it into a biography, Willoughby enlisted the help of Chamberlin as co-author. MacArthur, 1941–1951: Victory in the Pacific was published in 1954. The book was well-received. The military editor of The New York Times, Hanson W. Baldwin, wrote in The New York Times Book Review:

It is as a headquarters story that the book has its greatest value; it is the most comprehensive exposition of MacArthur's strategic and politico‐military judgments yet written. And it lifts the curtain slightly—though only to a tantalizing degree—upon MacArthur's mind, that mind with its sublime self‐confidence and its absolute sense of destiny.

In 1968, Willoughby and his wife moved to Naples, Florida, where they lived next door to his sister-in-law Edith and William Sebald. Willoughby died on 25 October 1972 and was buried at Arlington National Cemetery on 2 November. He was inducted into the Military Intelligence Hall of Fame in 1988. His papers are held by Gettysburg College, donated by his wife and Sebald, the executor of his will.

=== Dates of rank ===
Enlisted, United States Army: 10 October 1910; Discharged as Sergeant: 9 October 1913
Second lieutenant, Infantry: 27 November 1916
First lieutenant, Infantry: 27 November 1916
Captain, Infantry: 30 June 1917
Major, Infantry: 6 March 1928
Lieutenant colonel, Infantry: 1 June 1938
Colonel, Army of the United States: 14 October 1941
Brigadier general, Army of the United States: 20 June 1942
Major general, Army of the United States: 17 March 1945 (Terminated 31 May 1946)
Colonel, Infantry: 1 September 1945
Brigadier general, Army of the United States: 31 May 1946 (Date of rank 20 June 1942)
Brigadier general, United States Army: 24 January 1948
Major general, Army of the United States: 24 January 1948
Major general, Retired List: 1 September 1951

== Decorations and medals ==
Willoughby received numerous military decorations and medals, including:

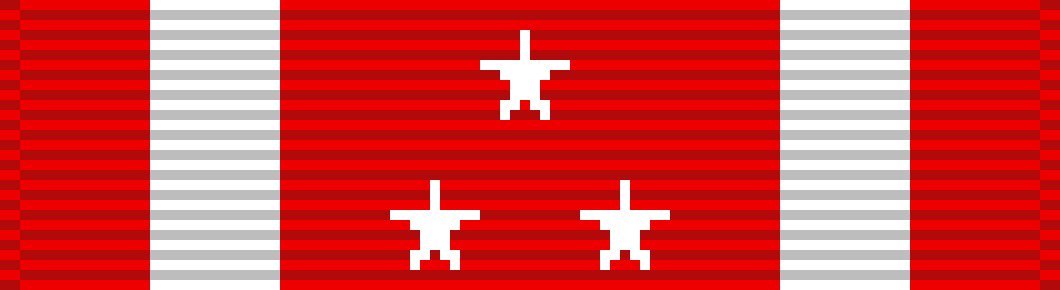

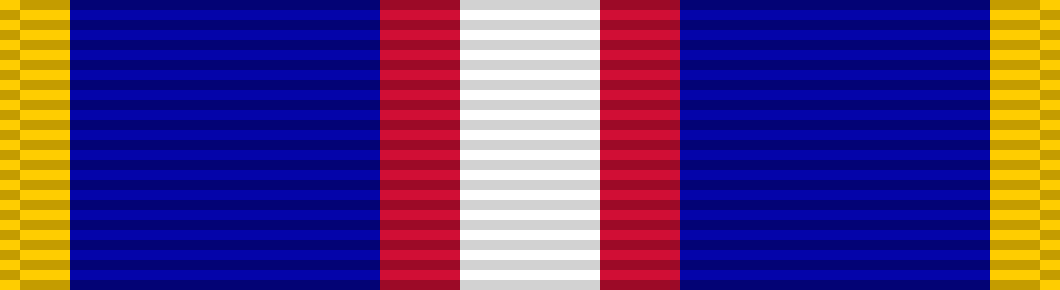

1st row	Distinguished Service Cross		Army Distinguished Service Medal with 2 Oak leaf clusters
2nd row	Silver Star	Legion of Merit	World War I Victory Medal
3rd row	American Defense Service Medal	American Campaign Medal	Asiatic-Pacific Campaign Medal with 7 Campaign stars
4th row	World War II Victory Medal	Army of Occupation Medal with 'Japan' clasp	National Defense Service Medal
5th row	Korean Service Medal with 1 Campaign star	Philippine Defense Medal with 1 Campaign star	Philippine Independence Medal
6th row	Philippine Liberation Medal with 2 Campaign stars	United Nations Service Medal Korea	Korean War Service Medal
Unit awards	Korean Presidential Unit Citation		

Foreign Decorations

Grand Officer of the Order of Orange-Nassau (Netherlands)
Commander of the Order of Saints Maurice and Lazarus (Italy)	Distinguished Service Star (Philippines)	Order of Abdon Calderón (Ecuador)

== Published works ==
Articles

- Willoughby, C. A. (June 1925). "A Great Patriotic Shrine, the House of Bolivar". Bulletin of the Pan-American Union. 59 (6): 573–589.
- Willoughby, Charles A. (January 1926). "The French in Morocco". Infantry Journal. 28 (1): 7–19.
- Willoughby, Charles A.; Hymoff, Edward (January 1966). "America Needs a Foreign Legion!". Argosy. Vol. 362, no. 1.

Books

- Willoughby, Charles Andrew (1931). The Economic and Military Participation of the United States in the World War, 1917–1918. Fort Leavenworth, Kansas: United States Army Command and General Staff College.
- Willoughby, Charles Andrew (1939). Maneuver in War (PDF). Harrisburg, Pennsylvania: The Military Service Publishing Co. OCLC 478047.
- Willoughby, Charles Andrew (1952). Shanghai Conspiracy: The Sorge Spy Ring, Moscow, Shanghai, Tokyo, San Francisco, New York. New York: Dutton.
- Willoughby, Charles Andrew; Chamberlin, John (1954). MacArthur, 1941–1951: Victory in the Pacific. New York: McGraw-Hill. OCLC 366467.
- Willoughby, Charles Andrew (1972). Guerrilla Resistance Movement in the Philippines, 1941–1945. New York: Vantage. ISBN 978-0-533-00592-5. OCLC 596741.
- Intelligence Series: G-2 USAFFE, SWPA, AFPAC, FEC, SCAP:
  - Willoughby, Charles Andrew (1948). A Brief history of the G-2 Section, GHQ, SWPA and affiliated units (PDF). Tokyo: General Headquarters, Far East Command, Military Intelligence Section, General Staff.
  - Vol I The Guerrilla Resistance Movement in the Philippines
  - Vol II Intelligence Activities in the P. I.: Japanese Occupation
  - Vol III Operations of the Military Intelligence Section
  - Vol IV Operations of the Allied Intelligence Bureau
  - Vol V Operations of the Allied Translator & Interpreter Section
  - Vol VI Operations of the Allied Geographical Section
  - Vol VII Operations of the Technical Intelligence Unit
  - Vol VIII Operations of the Counter Intelligence Corps
  - Vol IX Operations of the Civil Intelligence Section
- Reports of General MacArthur:
  - Volume I: The Campaigns of MacArthur in the Pacific
  - Volume I, Supplement: MacArthur in Japan: The Occupation Military Phase
  - Volume II: Japanese Operations in the Southwest Pacific Area (two parts)

== Notes ==
=== References ===
- Aid, Matthew M. (2000). "US Humint and Comint in the Korean War: From the Approach of War to the Chinese Intervention". In Aldrich, Richard J.; Rawnsley, Ming-Yeh (eds.). The Clandestine Cold War in Asia, 1945–65: Western Intelligence, Propaganda and Special Operations. Hoboken, New Jersey: Taylor & Francis Group. pp. 17–63. ISBN 978-0-7146-5045-6. OCLC 829461759.
- Appleman, Roy E. (1961). South to the Naktong, North to the Yalu (PDF). United States Army in the Korean War. Department of the Army. ISBN 0-16-035958-9. OCLC 251318063. Archived from the original (PDF) on 26 September 2012.
- Blackburn, Forrest R. (February 1972). "Military Review 1922-1972". Military Review. LII (2): 52–62. Archived from the original on 29 July 2022.
- Bradsher, Greg (2006). "Japanese Records Relating to War Crimes, 1942–1945". In Drea, Edward (ed.). Researching Japanese War Crimes Records: Introductory Essays (PDF). Washington, D.C.: Nazi War Crimes and Japanese Imperial Government Records Interagency Working Group. pp. 151–168. ISBN 1-880875-28-4. OCLC 607319915.
- Campbell, Kenneth J. (1998). "Major General Charles A. Willoughby: General MacArthur's G-2 – A Biographic Sketch". American Intelligence Journal. 18 (1/2): 87–91. JSTOR 44326644.
- Dower, John W. (May 1988). "A Rejoinder". Pacific Historical Review. 57 (2): 202–209. doi:10.2307/4492266. JSTOR 4492266.
- Drea, Edward J. (1992). MacArthur's Ultra: Codebreaking and the War Against Japan 1942 1945. Lawrence, Kansas: University Press of Kansas. ISBN 0-7006-0504-5. OCLC 23651196.
- Dufty, David (2017). The Secret Code-Breakers of Central Bureau. Melbourne, London: Scribe. ISBN 978-1-925322-18-7. OCLC 974681129.
- Foy, David A. (2023). Loyalty First: The Life and Times of Charles A. Willoughby, MacArthur's Chief Intelligence Officer. Havertown, Pennsylvania: Casemate Publishers. ISBN 978-1-63624-349-8. OCLC 1402279762.
- Gilmore, Allison (2004). "The Allied Translator and Interpreter Section: The Critical Role of Allied Linguists in the Process of Propaganda Creation, 1943–1944". In Dennis, Peter; Grey, Jeffrey (eds.). The Foundations of Victory: The Pacific War 1943–1944: The 2003 Chief of Army's Military History Conference. Canberra: Australian Army History Unit. pp. 149–167. ISBN 0-646-43590-6. OCLC 59714455.
- Hatch, David A.; Benson, Robert Louis (2000). The Korean War: The SIGINT Background (PDF). United States Cryptologic History: Series V: The Early Postwar Period 1945-1952. Vol. 3. Fort Meade, Maryland: Center for Cryptologic History, National Security Agency. Archived from the original (PDF) on 29 June 2022.
- Kluckhohn, Frank (19 August 1952). "Heidelberg to Madrid — The Story of General Willoughby" (PDF). The Reporter. pp. 25–30.
- Laurie, Clayton D. (2001). "General MacArthur and the OSS, 1942–1945" (PDF). Studies in Intelligence. 45 (1): 47–60.
- McManus, John C. (2021). Island Infernos: The US Army's Pacific War Odyssey, 1944. New York: Dutton Caliber. ISBN 978-0-451-47506-0. OCLC 1260166257.
- Mercado, Stephen C. (December 2023). "Loyalty First: The Life and Times of Charles A. Willoughby, MacArthur's Chief Intelligence Officer (review)" (PDF). Studies in Intelligence. 67 (4): 51–52. Archived from the original (PDF) on 13 February 2024.
- Milner, Samuel (1957). The War in the Pacific: Victory in Papua (PDF). Washington, DC: Office of the Chief of Military History, Department of the Army. Archived from the original (PDF) on 27 September 2012.
- Mortensen, Daniel R. (1997). "The Air Service in the Great War". In Nalty, Bernard C. (ed.). Winged Shield, Winged Sword: A History of the United States Air Force. Vol. 1: 1907–1950. Washington, D.C.: Air Force History and Museums Program, United States Air Force. ISBN 978-0-16-049009-5. OCLC 36103616.
- Morton, Louis (1953). The War in the Pacific: The Fall of the Philippines (PDF). Washington, D.C.: Office of the Chief of Military History, Department of the Army. Archived from the original (PDF) on 24 June 2012.
- NARA staff (2006). "Japanese War Crimes Records at the National Archives: Research Starting Points". In Drea, Edward (ed.). Researching Japanese War Crimes Records: Introductory Essays (PDF). Washington, D.C.: Nazi War Crimes and Japanese Imperial Government Records Interagency Working Group. pp. 79–110. ISBN 1-880875-28-4. OCLC 607319915.
- Petersen, Michael (2006). "The Intelligence that Wasn't: CIA Name Files, the U.S. Army, and Intelligence Gathering in Occupied Japan". In Drea, Edward (ed.). Researching Japanese War Crimes Records: Introductory Essays (PDF). Washington, D.C.: Nazi War Crimes and Japanese Imperial Government Records Interagency Working Group. pp. 197–230. ISBN 1-880875-28-4. OCLC 607319915.
- Rose, P. K. (Fall–Winter 2001). "Two Strategic Intelligence Mistakes in Korea, 1950" (PDF). Studies in Intelligence. 45 (5).
- Stafford, Matthew C. (2003). Reed Chambers, The Rise of an Aviation Entrepreneur (PDF) (PhD thesis). Tuscaloosa, Alabama: University of Alabama.
- Takemae, Eiji (2002). Inside GHQ: The Allied Occupation of Japan and Its Legacy. Translated by Ricketts, Robert; Swann, Sebastian. New York: Continuum. ISBN 0826462472. OL 6796320M – via Internet Archive.
