= Tarbuck =

Tarbuck may refer to:

== People ==
- Raymond D. Tarbuck (1897–1986), rear admiral in the U.S. Navy
- Jimmy Tarbuck (born 1940), English comedian and TV personality
- Barbara Tarbuck (1942–2016), American actress
- Alan Tarbuck (born 1948), English footballer
- Liza Tarbuck (born 1964), English actress and TV presenter
- Bradley Tarbuck (born 1995), English footballer

== Other uses ==
- Tarbuck Crag, a mountain in Antarctica
- Tarbuck knot used by climbers
