= USS Stephen Potter =

Fletcher-class destroyer

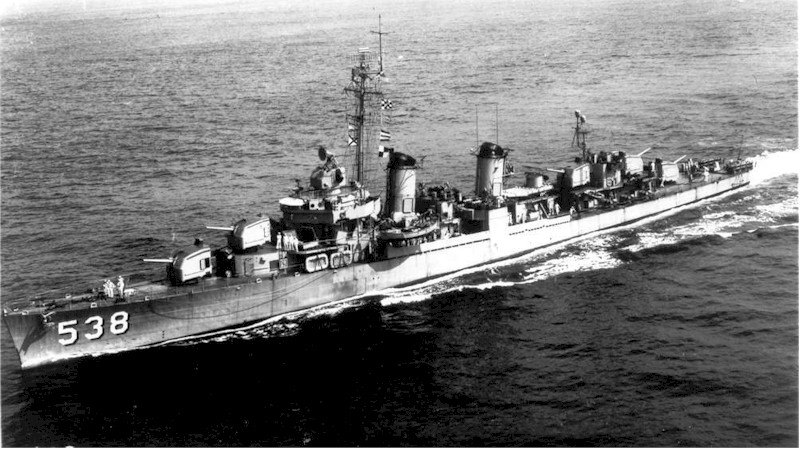
- USS Stephen Potter (DD-538)

History

United States
- Namesake: Stephen Potter
- Builder: Bethlehem Shipbuilding Corporation, San Francisco, California
- Laid down: 27 October 1942
- Launched: 28 April 1943
- Commissioned: 21 October 1943
- Decommissioned: 21 April 1958
- Stricken: 1 December 1972
- Nickname(s): Steamin' Steve
- Fate: Sold for scrap, 27 November 1973

General characteristics
- Class & type: Fletcher-class destroyer
- Displacement: 2,050 tons
- Length: 376 ft 6 in (114.7 m)
- Beam: 39 ft 8 in (12.1 m)
- Draft: 17 ft 9 in (5.4 m)
- Propulsion: 60,000 shp (45 MW); 2 propellers
- Speed: 35 knots (65 km/h; 40 mph)
- Range: 6500 nmi. (12,000 km) @ 15 kt
- Complement: 329
- Armament: 5 × single Mk 12 5 in (127 mm)/38 guns; 5 × twin 40 mm (1.6 in) Bofors AA guns; 7 × single 20 mm (0.8 in) Oerlikon AA guns; 2 × quintuple 21 in (533 mm) torpedo tubes; 6 × single depth charge throwers; 2 × depth charge racks

USS Stephen Potter (DD-538), a Fletcher-class destroyer, was a ship of the United States Navy. Stephen Potter was commissioned in 1943 and served in the Pacific during World War II. She was then mothballed until 1951 whereupon she saw service in several areas including the Korean War. In 1958 she was placed in reserve, and scrapped in 1973.

== Namesake ==
Stephen Potter was born on 26 December 1896 in Saginaw, Michigan. He attended Phillips Exeter Academy and was then a member of the second Yale University unit which left college in April 1917 to enter naval aviation. He trained with Volunteer Aerial Coast Patrol Unit No. 2 at Buffalo, New York, and was commissioned Ensign on 2 November 1917. He volunteered to go overseas immediately and was assigned to the Advanced School at Montchic, Gironde, France. He was later assigned to the British Royal Naval Air Station at Felixstowe, England.

On 25 April 1918 he flew from the North Sea Station in company with another plane. The pair spotted two German seaplanes, one of them piloted by Oberleutnant zur See Friedrich Christiansen with observer Bernhard Wladika, heading toward them approximately 6 miles (9.7 km) from North Hinder Light. Five additional German planes joined them and together the seven German combatants attacked the two British aircraft. Potter was killed after his plane was shot down by Christiansen's observer Wladika in the ensuing action.

== Construction and commissioning ==
Stephen Potter (DD-538) was laid down on 27 October 1942 by the Bethlehem Steel Co., San Francisco, California; launched on 28 April 1943; sponsored by Sally and Marian Potter, nieces of Ensign Potter; and commissioned on 21 October 1943.

Stephen Potter held its shakedown in the San Diego area and returned to San Francisco on 8 December. The ship sailed for Hawaii late in the month and arrived at Pearl Harbor on the last day of 1943. The destroyer was assigned to the Fast Carrier Task Force (called TF 58 or TF 38, depending on whether it was part of the 5th Fleet or 3rd Fleet) which sortied, on 16 January 1944, to launch air strikes against the Marshall Islands. Strikes began on 29 January in preparation for the amphibious assault which began on 31 January.

== 1944 ==
Stephen Potter was in the screen of the fast carriers when they made the first strike against Truk on 17 and 18 February 1944. Intrepid was damaged on the 17th by an aircraft torpedo, and the DD escorted the carrier back to the Marshalls. Stephen Potter departed there on 27 February, called at Pearl Harbor, and sailed to the West Coast of the United States. She arrived on 13 March and, five days later, began the voyage back to Majuro where she rejoined the fast carriers.

Stephen Potter screened the carriers as they launched strikes on 21 and 22 April supporting the assault on Hollandia, New Guinea. At the end of the month, they returned again to bomb Truk. Stephen Potter, Monterey and MacDonough were steaming south of Truk on 30 April when MacDonough made a radar contact on a submarine, which soon disappeared as the enemy submerged. Sonar contact was made, and MacDonough made two depth charge attacks. Stephen Potter came to assist with an attack, and a plane from Monterey gave its support. Several deep explosions were heard, and much oil and debris came to the surface as the Ro-45 sank. On 1 May, the destroyer participated in the bombardment of Ponape Island in the Carolines. The task force refueled and rearmed at Majuro and, on 19 and 20 May, attacked Marcus Island before bombing Wake Island on 23 May. The ships returned to Eniwetok for refit in preparation for the Mariana Islands campaign.

Task Group 58.2 (TG 58.2) sortied on 6 June and, a week later, began strikes against Saipan. On 17 June, the task force moved into the Philippine Sea to block a strong Japanese fleet which threatened the American conquest of Saipan. The Battle of the Philippine Sea, commonly referred to as the "Marianas Turkey Shoot", began on 19 June and lasted for two days. During the battle, Stephen Potter rescued seven downed pilots. After a five-day refit period at Eniwetok, the ships attacked targets in the Bonin, Palau, and Caroline Islands during July before returning to the Marshalls for replenishment.

On 30 July, Stephen Potter joined TG 58.4 which, from 31 July to 8 August, provided air support for United States troops fighting on Guam. The destroyer steamed from Eniwetok on 30 August, rendezvoused with TG 38.2 on 3 September, and screened the fast carriers as their aircraft pounded the Philippines from 9 to 25 September. Strikes were launched against Mindanao, Luzon, Cebu, Leyte, Angaur, and Manila Bay. The task group was at Ulithi from 1 to 6 October when it again got underway.

Stephen Potter screened Admiral Gerald F. Bogan's carriers as they launched strikes against Okinawa on 10 October and against Formosa on 12, 13, and 14 October. On 13 October, Canberra was torpedoed below her armor belt and lost all power. She was taken in tow by Wichita, and Stephen Potter was assigned as one of their escorts. The next day, Houston, hit by a torpedo in the engine room, was taken in tow by Boston and joined the retiring Canberra group, now designated Task Unit (TU) 30.3.1. Munsee relieved Wichita of towing Canberra on 15 October, and Pawnee relieved Boston of her duties on 16 October. Houston was torpedoed again on the 16th, and all unnecessary men were removed. Stephen Potter took 83 on board. She detached to return to TG 38.2 on 20 October, which was en route to the Philippines to support Allied landings on Leyte which began that day. Air strikes were flown against Luzon on 22 October, and the carriers retired toward Manus the next day.

On 1 November, Stephen Potter proceeded to Ulithi, via Saipan, where she rendezvoused with the fast carriers and escorted them to the Philippines. Air strikes were flown against the Visayas area, Manila, and Luzon from 11 to 25 November when the force retired.

The task group had a short rest at Ulithi and, on 11 December, moved to the operating area east of Luzon to support the landings at Mindoro. Beginning on 14 December, the carriers launched strikes against Luzon for three consecutive days and, after refueling, returned to Ulithi on 24 December.

Stephen Potter was underway again on 30 December 1944 to join TG 38.2 en route to a launching point for attacks against Formosa. Air strikes were launched against Formosa and Okinawa for two days and, after moving southeast, against Luzon on 6 and 7 January 1945.

== 1945 ==
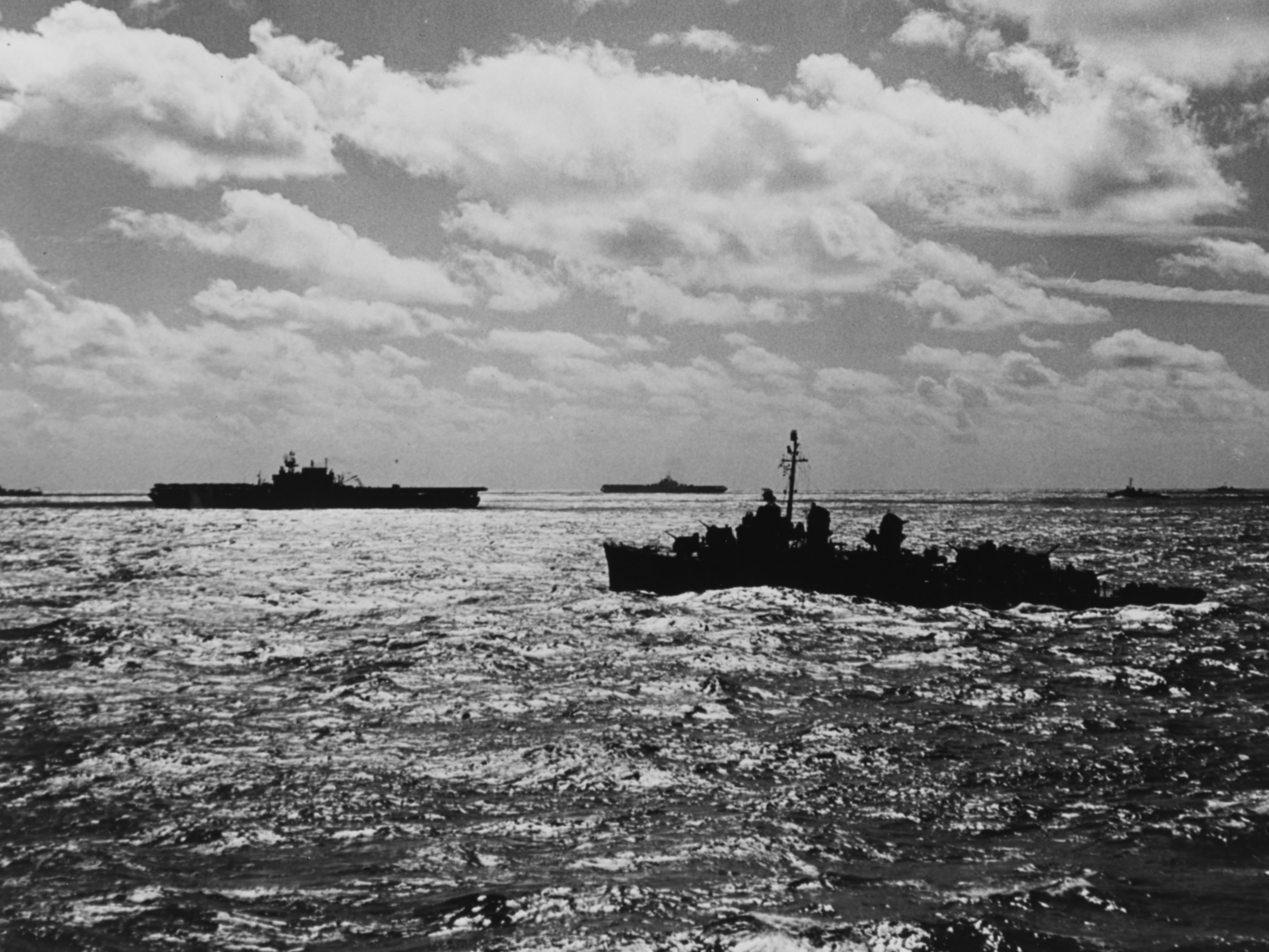
USS Stephen Potter (at right) and other ships of the Third Fleet en route to the Philippines in January 1945

Stephen Potter entered the South China Sea on 9 January with the carriers which launched air strikes against Saigon and Camranh Bay, Indochina, on 12 January and Formosa on 15 January. Strikes were made against Hainan and Hong Kong on 16 January, after which American planes made a photographic reconnaissance of Okinawa before retiring to Ulithi. The destroyer sortied with TG 58.2 on 10 February and participated in the carrier strikes against the Tokyo area on, 16 and 17 February. From 19 through 22 February, strikes were launched against Iwo Jima to support the landing there. Two days later, the carriers sailed towards Japan and, on 25 February, launched air strikes against targets in the Tokyo Bay area before returning to Ulithi on 1 March.

The task group was at sea again on 14 March and, four days later, launched attacks against airfields on Kyūshū and against Japanese shipping at Kobe and Kure. The strikes continued the next day. The destroyer rescued a downed pilot on 18 March and saved another on 19 March. The task group was under enemy air attack both days. As the forces withdrew, they were under constant air attack. Franklin was hit on 19 March and Enterprise on the next day. Stephen Potter was in the screen that escorted the carriers back to Ulithi.

The destroyer was at sea again on 5 April with TG 58.2, in an area east of Okinawa. Strikes were flown against that island stronghold until 13 May when air raids were launched against Kyūshū. On 11 May, she picked up 107 survivors from Bunker Hill which had been hit by a kamikaze. Strikes were launched against Okinawa again from 22 to 28 May, and the group then sailed for Leyte. Stephen Potter then sailed for the United States, via Eniwetok and Pearl Harbor, arriving at San Francisco on 9 July. She underwent overhaul at the Mare Island Navy Yard until 31 August.

The war was over, and the destroyer was destined to be placed in the Pacific Reserve Fleet. After preparations were completed for placing her in "mothballs," Stephen Potter was placed out of commission, in reserve, on 21 September 1945 and berthed at Long Beach.

== 1951–1958 ==
On 29 March 1951, Stephen Potter was placed back in commission and, after a brief shakedown cruise, sailed on 23 June for the East Coast of the United States and duty with the Atlantic Fleet. She arrived at Newport on 11 July and operated with the Atlantic Fleet until 1 April 1953 when she again sailed to the Pacific. Stephen Potter joined the United Nations fleet off the east coast of Korea and operated there until the cessation of hostilities.

After returning to the United States, the destroyer entered the Boston Naval Shipyard and had extensive repairs and alterations performed. On 28 March 1954, she sailed for Guantanamo Bay and refresher training. On 5 January 1955, she sailed for western Europe and made good will visits to Belgium, Germany, and Norway before arriving back in Newport on 26 May 1955. In April 1956, Stephen Potter was in Long Beach and, on 14 July, operated with Destroyer Squadron 23, out of Kobe, Japan, before returning to the United States in November 1956.

On 21 April 1958, Stephen Potter was again placed out of commission, in reserve, and berthed at Mare Island, Calif. She remained there until 1 December 1972 when she was struck from the Navy List. Stephen Potter was sold 27 November 1973 and broken up for scrap.

== Honors ==
Stephen Potter received 12 battle stars for World War II service.
