= Raymond D. Tarbuck =

United States Navy admiral (1897–1986)

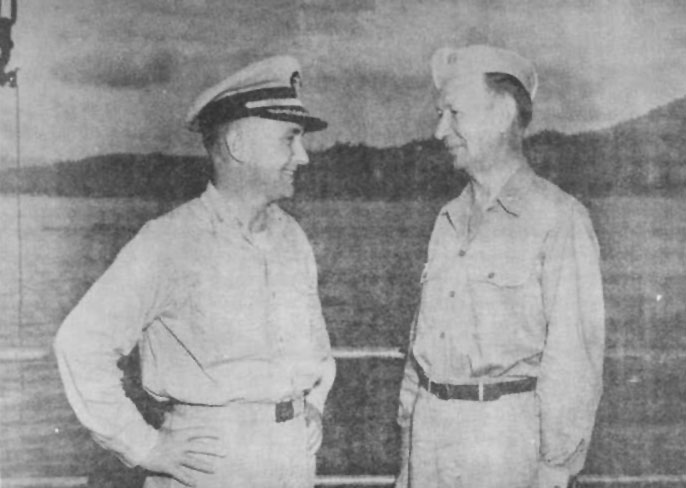
- Commodore Raymond D. Tarbuck (left) with Rear Admiral Albert G. Noble (right)
- Born: 4 May 1897; Philadelphia, Pennsylvania, U.S.
- Died: 15 November 1986 (aged 89); Coronado, California, U.S.
- Burial place: Fort Rosecrans National Cemetery, San Diego, California
- Military career
- Allegiance: United States of America
- Branch: United States Navy
- Service years: 1920–1950
- Rank: Rear Admiral
- Nickname: Ray
- Commands: USS Iowa; Destroyer Division 70; USS Macdonough
- Conflicts: World War I; Russian Civil War; United States occupation of Nicaragua; World War II; New Guinea Campaign; Philippines Campaign (1944-45)
- Awards: Legion of Merit (2)

Raymond D. Tarbuck (4 May 1897 – 15 November 1986) was a rear admiral in the United States Navy who is best known as a planner with General Douglas MacArthur's General Headquarters (GHQ) Southwest Pacific Area during World War II.

A 1920 graduate of the United States Naval Academy in Annapolis, Maryland, Tarbuck spent most of his early career on destroyers. During a tour of duty in the Caribbean, he served ashore with the United States occupation of Nicaragua. Later, while at the Naval War College at Newport, Rhode Island, he wrote a thesis entitled "The Nicaraguan Policy of the United States", which was subsequently published by the United States Naval Institute.

Tarbuck received his first command, the destroyer USS Macdonough in May 1939, and in March 1941, he assumed command of Destroyer Division 70. Then, in October 1941, he became an instructor in air observer and navigator training with the United States Army Air Corps at Maxwell Field, Alabama. In 1943 he was assigned to General MacArthur's GHQ, where he planned a series of combined operations, and accurately predicted the course of the Battle of Leyte Gulf. He served with GHQ until December 1944, when he became chief of staff of the VII Amphibious Force.

After the war he became the chief of staff of Amphibious Forces, Atlantic Fleet. His last command was of the battleship USS Iowa. He retired from active service on 1 July 1950, and received a tombstone promotion to the rank of rear admiral.

== Early life ==
Raymond Dumbell (Ray) Tarbuck was born in Philadelphia on 4 May 1897. (Note: The birth year is from his death certificate. His Navy file says 1898, but he admitted that the family bible said 1897.) His middle name caused him embarrassment and was seldom used, and he preferred the shortened form of his first name. He was educated at Philadelphia Central High School and the Philadelphia College of Pedagogy, where he studied to be a teacher, graduating with a Bachelor of Arts degree. He also attended the Naval Academy Preparatory School.

Tarbuck was appointed to the United States Naval Academy in Annapolis, Maryland in June 1917 by Congressman George W. Edmonds of Pennsylvania's 4th congressional district. At the Academy he was on the shooting team, and was assistant art editor of the Lucky Bag, and the editor of The Log magazine. While there he took his summer cruises on the battleships USS Missouri and USS North Dakota during World War I. He was commissioned as an ensign on graduation on 5 June 1920. His class was graduated in two groups due to the disruption caused by World War I. For his first assignment, he chose the destroyer tender USS Dixie, because it was based at the League Island Navy Yard in Philadelphia, and he was in love with Marion Orf, a woman who lived in Philadelphia's Germantown section. The two were married in 1921. They had a son, Richard Ray Tarbuck, and a daughter, Joan.

As had been his intention, Tarbuck's early service was on destroyers, first as engineer and radio officer on the USS Robinson and then as chief engineer on the USS McCormick from 1922 to 1924. The ship sailed to the Black Sea, where Tarbuck observed the Russian Civil War first hand. He served in succession as torpedo officer on the destroyer USS Sharkey, as a communications officer on the cruiser USS Concord and as gunnery officer on the destroyer USS Flusser. During this cruise in the Caribbean, he served ashore with the United States occupation of Nicaragua.

Tarbuck attended the Naval Postgraduate School at Annapolis from 1927 to 1928, and then the Naval War College at Newport, Rhode Island. While there he wrote a thesis entitled "The Nicaraguan Policy of the United States", which was subsequently published by the United States Naval Institute. He returned to sea in 1929 as executive officer of the destroyer USS Stewart, which sailed to China, Japan and the Philippines as part of the Asiatic Fleet. His daughter Joan died in Shanghai. On returning to the United States in 1932, he was assigned to the University of California as a Naval Reserve Officers Training Corps instructor. He taught astronomy there as an assistant professor. Robert Gordon Sproul requested that Tarbuck be permanently assigned to the university, but the Navy turned him down on the grounds that Tarbuck's career would suffer without sea duty.

Tarbuck's next assignment was to a battleship, the USS West Virginia, where he was promoted to lieutenant commander. Following the pattern of alternating duty at sea with duty ashore, he was assigned to the Fleet Training Division of the Bureau of Navigation from June 1937 to May 1939.

== World War II ==
In May 1939, Tarbuck received his first command, of the destroyer USS Macdonough, which was part of the U.S. Pacific Fleet. While he was its captain, he was promoted to the rank of commander. In March 1941, he assumed command of Destroyer Division 70, which consisted of five destroyers based on the West Coast. In October 1941, he was ordered to report to the Naval Air Station Pensacola, an unusual destination for a non-aviator. The United States Army Air Corps had requested that some Naval officers be sent to Maxwell Field, Alabama, as instructors in air observer and navigator training, and Tarbuck was one of the three officers selected. At Maxwell, he wrote three manuals on ship and aircraft recognition, which became course materials. The ability to speak "Army", and knowledge of the conduct of land, sea and air operations, would prove important in his selection for his next post. He was promoted to captain on 20 June 1942.

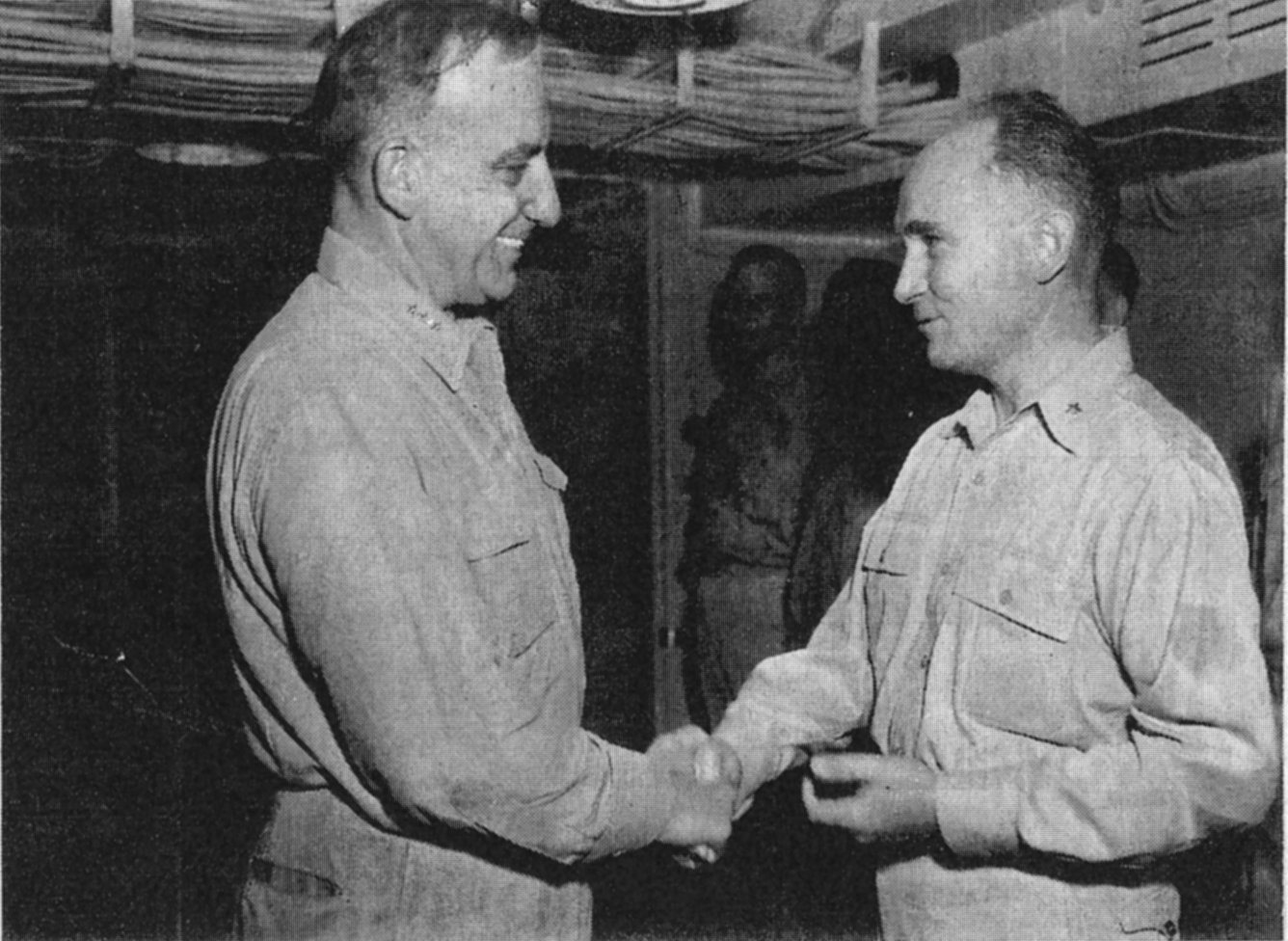
Commodore Raymond D. Tarbuck (right) is congratulated by Vice Admiral Daniel E. Barbey (left) on being awarded a gold star in lieu of a second Legion of Merit in June 1945

In 1943, the Supreme Commander in the Southwest Pacific Area, General Douglas MacArthur, requested a Naval officer for his General Headquarters (GHQ) to replace Captain Herbert J. Ray, an officer who had escaped from the Philippines with him in 1942, who had been appointed to command the battleship USS Maryland. Tarbuck was chosen to replace him. En route to Australia, he met with Admiral Chester Nimitz, who told him in no uncertain terms that anti-Army and anti-MacArthur sentiments had no place in his command. Tarbuck became a loyal supporter of MacArthur, and he deplored unproductive Army-Navy rivalry.

He expected to become the head of a naval section within GHQ, but instead found himself part of Brigadier General Stephen J. Chamberlin G-3 Section, the staff section responsible for planning and operations. He found that more than forty naval officers were working at GHQ, but they were dispersed, working in nearly every corner of the staff. He became head of a planning group known as the Red Team. This was one of three teams; there was also a White Team under a US army officer, Colonel Peyton, and a Blue Team under an Australian Army officer, Brigadier Tom White.

Tarbuck's job was to prepare staff studies on upcoming potential operations. While he did do naval planning, his team prepared plans that coordinated land, air and sea operations. A staff study might be put into effect and become an operation, or MacArthur might shelve it in favor of an alternative operation, especially if the staff study revealed that it would be too time-consuming, difficult or costly. The three teams would work simultaneously on three different objectives in leapfrog fashion. Tarbuck routinely attended staff conferences that involved naval matters.

He led the planning for the Battle of Leyte, known as Operation King II, and predicted that the Japanese fleet would attempt to intervene, striking at the invasion force through the Surigao Strait. His warning that the Japanese fleet would sortie was discounted by MacArthur's chief intelligence officer, Brigadier General Charles A. Willoughby, but Tarbuck put his objection in writing. MacArthur would later commend him for an accurate prediction of the course of the Battle of Leyte Gulf.

Tarbuck was on hand to see the battle as an observer on the command ship USS Blue Ridge. He watched as his predictions on the courses of the Battle of Surigao Strait and Battle off Samar unfolded. On the morning of 25 October he wrote:

It now becomes apparent that an extremely critical situation exists. The enemy's Second Diversion Attack Force has sortied into the Pacific Ocean through the San Bernardino Strait under the cover of darkness to attack our escort carriers, convoys, or Leyte Gulf shipping.

A while later he wrote:

People here feel that Halsey's Third Fleet are chasing a secondary force, leaving us at the mercy—of which there is none—of the enemy's main body.

In his report on the battle, Vice Admiral Randall Jacobs called Tarbuck's predictions as "almost uncanny". For his service with GHQ, Tarbuck was awarded the Legion of Merit.

In December 1944, Tarbuck became chief of staff of the VII Amphibious Force, which was under the command of Rear Admiral Daniel E. Barbey. He was promoted to the wartime rank of commodore on 3 April 1945. When Barbey went on leave, he left Tarbuck in command of VII Amphibious Force, despite the fact that his three amphibious group commanders, William Fechteler, Albert G. Noble and Arthur D. Struble were all rear admirals. They were in overall command of the operations for which they were responsible however. For his service as chief of staff of the VII Amphibious Force, Tarbuck was awarded a second Legion of Merit. His citation read:

For distinguishing himself by exceptionally meritorious conduct in connection with amphibious operations against Japanese forces in the Philippine Islands and Borneo from December 1944 to July 1945. As chief of staff to Commander, VII Amphibious Force he was directly concerned with the planning and execution of all amphibious operations in the Southwest Pacific during this period. These included the landings on the island of Luzon at Lingayen, Zambales, Nasugbu, Legaspi, Bataan, Corregidor, and on the islands guarding the entrance to Manila Bay; on the islands of Palawan, Lubang, Panay, Cebu, Negros, Masbati, Jolo and Buhol; on the island of Mindanao at Zamboanga, Parang, Macajala Bay and Davao; in Borneo at Tarakan and Brunei Bay. In addition he assisted in the preparation of plans for minesweeping operations covering an area of approximately six thousand square miles in Philippine waters.

== Later life ==
Tarbuck became the chief of staff of Amphibious Forces, Atlantic Fleet in December 1945. He reverted to the rank of captain on 20 June 1946. On 30 June he assumed command of the battleship USS Iowa. After a year in this command, he became Inspector General of the Eleventh Naval District at San Diego, California. At the conclusion of this posting, he retired from active service on 1 July 1950. On retirement, he received a tombstone promotion to the rank of rear admiral.

He became program administrator for the San Diego Fine Arts Gallery, and served with the San Diego Board of Health and other community projects. He also served on the South Bay Committee for San Diego. He died in Coronado, California on 15 November 1986, and was interred in the Fort Rosecrans National Cemetery, San Diego, California. His papers are in the Douglas MacArthur Memorial in Norfolk, Virginia.
