= Japanese submarine Ro-45 =

Kaichū-type submarine

History

Empire of Japan
- Name: Submarine No. 386
- Builder: Mitsubishi, Kobe, Japan
- Laid down: 20 October 1942
- Launched: 21 July 1943
- Renamed: Ro-45 on 21 July 1943
- Completed: 11 January 1944
- Commissioned: 11 January 1944
- Fate: Sunk 30 April 1944
- Stricken: 10 July 1944

General characteristics
- Class & type: Kaichū type submarine (K6 subclass)
- Displacement: 1,133 t (1,115 long tons) (surfaced); 1,470 tonnes (1,447 long tons) (submerged)
- Length: 80.5 m (264 ft 1 in) (o/a)
- Beam: 7 m (23 ft 0 in)
- Draft: 4.07 m (13 ft 4 in)
- Installed power: 4,200 bhp (3,100 kW) (diesel); 1,200 hp (890 kW) (electric motor)
- Propulsion: Diesel-electric; 1 × diesel engine; 1 × electric motor
- Speed: 19.75 knots (36.58 km/h; 22.73 mph) (surfaced); 8 knots (15 km/h; 9.2 mph) (submerged)
- Range: 5,000 nmi (9,300 km; 5,800 mi) at 16 knots (30 km/h; 18 mph) (surfaced); 45 nmi (83 km; 52 mi) at 5 knots (9.3 km/h; 5.8 mph) (submerged)
- Test depth: 80 m (260 ft)
- Crew: 61
- Armament: 4 × bow 533 mm (21 in) torpedo tubes; 1 × 76.2 mm (3.00 in) AA gun; 2 × single 25 mm (1.0 in) AA guns

Ro-45 was an Imperial Japanese Navy Kaichū type submarine of the K6 sub-class. Completed and commissioned in January 1944, she served in the central Pacific Ocean during World War II and was sunk in April 1944 during her first combat sortie.

== Design and description ==
The submarines of the K6 sub-class were versions of the preceding K5 sub-class with greater range and diving depth. They displaced 1,133 metric tons (1,115 long tons) surfaced and 1,470 metric tons (1,447 long tons) submerged. The submarines were 80.5 meters (264 ft 1 in) long overall, had a beam of 7 meters (23 ft) and a draft of 4.07 meters (13 ft 4 in). They had an operational diving depth of 80 meters (260 ft).

For surface running, the boats were powered by two 2,100-brake-horsepower (1,566 kW) diesel engines, each driving one propeller shaft. When submerged each propeller was driven by a 600-horsepower (447 kW) electric motor. They could reach 19.75 knots (36.58 km/h; 22.73 mph) on the surface and 8 knots (15 km/h; 9.2 mph) underwater. On the surface, the K6s had a range of 11,000 nautical miles (20,000 km; 13,000 mi) at 12 knots (22 km/h; 14 mph); submerged, they had a range of 45 nmi (83 km; 52 mi) at 5 knots (9.3 km/h; 5.8 mph).

The boats were armed with four internal bow 53.3 cm (21.0 in) torpedo tubes and carried a total of ten torpedoes. They were also armed with a single 40-caliber 76.2 mm (3 in) anti-aircraft (AA) gun and two single 25 mm (1 in) AA guns.

== Construction and commissioning ==
Ro-45 was laid down as Submarine No. 386 on 20 October 1942 by Mitsubishi at Kobe, Japan. She was launched on 21 July 1943 and was renamed Ro-45 on that day. She was completed and commissioned on 11 January 1944.

== Service history ==
Upon commissioning, Ro-45 was attached to the Maizuru Naval District and assigned to Submarine Squadron 11 for workups. On 14 April 1944, she was reassigned to Submarine Division 34 in the 6th Fleet. She departed Kure, Japan, on 16 April 1944 bound for Truk, which she reached on 27 April 1944.

While Ro-45 was at Truk, the aircraft carriers of United States Navy Task Force 58 began two days of airstrikes against Truk on 29 April 1944. On 30 April 1944, during the second day of strikes, the commander of Submarine Squadron 7 ordered Ro-45 and the submarines I-16, I-176, Ro-44, Ro-106, Ro-108, and Ro-115 to intercept Task Force 58.

== Loss ==
At 06:21 local time on 30 April 1944, the U.S. Navy destroyer USS MacDonough (DD-351) made radar contact on an unidentified vessel on the surface 40 nautical miles (74 km; 46 mi) south of Truk. The contact disappeared from radar, indicating a submerging submarine. MacDonough subsequently gained sonar contact on the submarine and, with an F6F Hellcat fighter from Fighter Squadron 28 (VF-28) aboard the light aircraft carrier USS Monterey (CVL-26) providing spotting support, made two depth-charge attacks. The destroyer USS Stephen Potter (DD-538) also joined the attack. The destroyer crews noted several underwater explosions after the last depth charge detonated, marking the end of the submarine, which sank at 06°13′N 151°19′E. Oil and debris later rose to the surface.

No other Japanese submarine made contact with Task Force 58, and the submarine MacDonough and Stephen Potter sank probably was Ro-45. On 20 May 1944, the Imperial Japanese Navy declared her to be presumed lost off Truk with all 74 men on board. She was stricken from the Navy list on 10 July 1944.

Some sources suggest that Ro-45 was sunk off Saipan in the Mariana Islands by the U.S. submarine USS Seahorse (SS-304) on 20 April 1944, but that is incorrect because Ro-45 remained active after that date. Other sources incorrectly identify the Japanese submarine sunk on 30 April 1944 as I-174, but I-174 was sunk on 12 April 1944.
