= Matthew Aid =

American journalist

Matthew Morris Aid
- Born: March 11, 1958; New York City, New York
- Died: August 20, 2018 (aged 60); Washington, D. C.
- Education: Beloit College, Wisconsin
- Occupations: Historian, Author

Matthew Morris Aid (March 11, 1958 – August 20, 2018) was an American military historian and author. Aid graduated from Beloit College in 1980, having studied international relations. He studied the Russian language, while a member of the United States Air Force, and was a Russian linguist for the National Security Agency, and the Air Force.

During his career, he became an expert on signal intelligence and the history of the NSA. Aid has been interviewed by multiple organizations including National Public Radio and C-SPAN and his work has been published in numerous journals, newspapers, and magazines including Foreign Policy, Politico magazine, National Security Archive, and the Associated Press.

== Biography ==
Matthew Morris Aid was born on March 11, 1958, in New York City. His father, Harry, was an attorney for Mobil Oil and his mother, Rita, was a political activist. His family lived in France and Libya, when he was a young boy, and he attended an American-run oil companies school, outside of Tripoli, Libya from 1963 to 1967.

In an opinion article Aid wrote, in 2011, he recalled his family's experience during the Six Day War, when they were forced to evacuate, to a nearby Air Force base, where they were taken to Spain. He wrote, "I remember vividly as our car was stoned by mobs of angry Libyan youths as my mother drove through downtown Tripoli on the way to the base."

After his family returned to the U.S., his brother, Jonathan, described how 12-year old Aid would tell their parents that he was going to the library, but would instead take the train to the National Archives. Aid attended high school in New York City, where his interest in collecting declassified documents and love of playing war games, led him to become friends with John Prados, a National Security Archive fellow, who was attending graduate school at Columbia University and at the time, designed board war games. Prados recalled his disappointment when Aid left for Beloit College, in Wisconsin, saying Aid would share documents with him and was, "one of my best playtesters." After graduating from Beloit, where he studied international relations and Russian, he enlisted in the Air Force, where he became a Russian language expert.

After leaving the military, Aid spent 20 years as a corporate investigator. However, Aid considered himself an independent scholar, who enjoyed studying documents from libraries and the National Archives in College Park, Maryland, saying "any spare time I have, I run up to the National Archives to do historical research."

In 2005, Aid, a visiting fellow at the National Security Archive, made his first contribution to the National Security Archive, while he did research for his book about the NSA's history. Examples of some of the discoveries made in his research include a Gulf of Tonkin incident that higher level officials had refused to declassify, and secret investigations into Martin Luther King, Muhammad Ali and Art Buchwald.

In 2006, his research led to the discovery that over 25 thousand records had been removed from the National Archives.

=== Discovery of National Archives records removal ===
In 2006, Aid, was performing research about the National Archives and learned that 25,515 records had been removed from the National Archives by five agencies, namely the CIA, the Air Force, the Energy Department, the Federal Emergency Management Agency and the Archives itself. In a 2006 Washington Post story, Christopher Lee reported: "Last year Aid was the first to figure out that for years the CIA and the Air Force had been withdrawing thousands of records from the public shelves -- and that Archives officials helped cover up their efforts. The ensuing scandal triggered a temporary suspension of the program this spring and a pledge from Archives officials that the public would be notified when withdrawals occur."

=== Court-martial and imprisonment ===
Washington Post reporter Christopher Lee reported that Aid had been punished 21 years earlier for unauthorized possession of classified information and impersonating an officer while serving as a staff sergeant in the United States Air Force in the United Kingdom.

Aid was court-martialed for unauthorized possession of classified documents and impersonating an officer, received a bad conduct discharge, and was imprisoned for a year in 1986. Aid responded that the release of his military records to the press was done in retaliation for his discovery of the National Archives records removal, which led to an official investigation and press-attention.

== Bibliography ==
A sampling of some of the books and journal articles authored by Aid are listed below.

- Aid, Matthew M; Wiebes, Cees, eds. (2001). Secrets of signals intelligence during the Cold War and beyond. London; Portland, OR: Frank Cass. ISBN 978-0-7146-5176-7. OCLC 46449026.
- Legnitto, Jan; Murphy, Margaret; Sciere, Kathy; Johnson, Larry; Toomey, David; Lang, Patrick; Aid, Matthew M; Russell, Steve; Cohen, William (2003), History now., New York, NY: A & E Television Networks : Distributed by New Video, ISBN 978-0-7670-5997-8, OCLC 53481276
- George, Roger Z; Kline, Robert D; Aid, Matthew M; Andrew, Christopher M; Bromwich, Michael R; Bruce, James B; Cogan, Charles G; Davis, Jack; Dehqanzada, Yahya A (2005). Intelligence and the National Security Strategist: Enduring Issues and Challenges. Lanham: Rowman & Littlefield Publishers. ISBN 978-1-4616-3780-6. OCLC 855503013.
- Aid, Mathew M. (2007). "Eavesdroppers of the Kremlin". The History of Information Security. pp. 497–522. doi:10.1016/B978-044451608-4/50018-3. ISBN 978-0-444-51608-4.
- Aid, Matthew M (2009). The secret sentry: the untold history of the National Security Agency. New York: Bloomsbury Press. ISBN 978-1-59691-515-2. OCLC 244354003.
  - review by Schindler, John; Aid, Matthew (27 March 2018). "Uncovering No Such Agency—The Secret Sentry: The Untold History of the National Security Agency". Naval War College Review. 63 (4).
- Aid, Matthew M (2012). Intel wars: the secret history of the fight against terror. New York: Bloomsbury Press. ISBN 978-1-60819-481-0. OCLC 727704122.
- Formats and Editions of Cold war intelligence : the declassified documentary record about the successes and failures of the U.S. intelligence community in its efforts to spy on the Soviet Union during the Cold War [WorldCat.org]. OCLC 967298359.
- Aid, Matthew M (2013). Cold War intelligence online: the secret war between the U.S. and the USSR, 1945-1991. Brill. ISBN 978-90-04-24462-7. OCLC 862210403.
- Aid, Matthew M; Wiebes, Cees (2013). Secrets of Signals Intelligence During the Cold War: From Cold War to Globalization. Hoboken: Taylor and Francis. doi:10.4324/9781315038902. ISBN 978-1-135-28098-7. OCLC 865330815.
- Aid, Matthew M; Brill Academic Publishers (2015). U.S. intelligence on Europe, 1945-1995. OCLC 925486988.
