= Tarbuck Crag =

Mountain in Antarctica

Tarbuck Crag (68°35′S 78°12′E) is one of a group of three high points about 0.75 nautical miles (1.4 km) southwest of Club Lake in the Vestfold Hills, Antarctica. The feature is 140 m high and has steep sides to the south and east. The feature was the terminal tellurometer station of the 1969 ANARE (Australian National Antarctic Research Expeditions) Prince Chabroarles Mountains survey. Named by Antarctic Names Committee of Australia (ANCA) for J. Tarbuck, cook at Wilkes Station in 1965, cook at Davis Station in 1969, and expedition assistant with ANARE at Wilkes in 1967.

The highest of the points houses a repeater station on marine channel 21, operated by the Australian Antarctic Division for use through the broader Vestfold Hills.
