= Laurence E. Bunker =

American Army Colonel

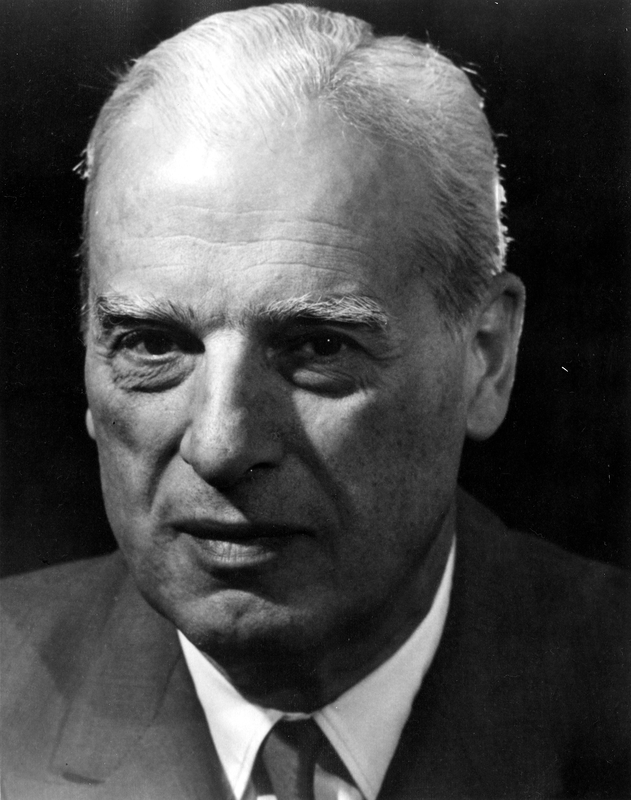
- Col. Bunker in 1970
- Born: June 27, 1902; Wellesley Hills, Massachusetts, U.S.
- Died: October 10, 1977 (aged 75); Boston, Massachusetts, U.S.
- Education: Harvard University; New York Law School
- Writing career
- Notable awards: Army Distinguished Service Medal; Legion of Merit

Laurence Eliot Bunker (June 27, 1902 – October 10, 1977) was a U.S. Army Colonel, who served as aide-de-camp to General Douglas MacArthur from 1946 to 1952.

== Early life and education ==
Bunker was born and raised in Wellesley Hills, Massachusetts, where he lived his entire life at the family home on Chestnut Street. His parents were Clarence Alfred Bunker, an attorney at the prominent Boston law firm of Fish, Richardson, & Storrow, and Cordelia Mitchell (Barker) Bunker. He attended Roxbury Latin School, and later graduated from Harvard University in 1926. He subsequently received a Juris Doctor from New York Law School in 1938. During the interim, he also obtained degrees at Cambridge University in England.

== Career ==
Bunker joined the Army in 1942, shortly after the American entry into the Second World War. His first assignment was as aide-de-camp to Gen. Richard Marshall in Australia. In April 1946 he then joined the staff of Gen. MacArthur, serving through most of the Occupation of Japan and the Korean War. He served as MacArthur's chief spokesman. Shortly after leaving MacArthur's staff in November 1952, Col. Bunker retired from the armed forces.

He went on to practice law in Wellesley Hills. In 1958, he was one of the eleven original founding members of the John Birch Society, alongside Robert W. Welch Jr., Fred C. Koch, and Revilo P. Oliver, among others. He remained a member of the National Council of the JBS, the society's top governing body, through the end of his life.

== Death ==
Bunker died of cancer at New England Baptist Hospital on October 10, 1977.
