= Edward J. Drea =

American military historian

Edward John Drea
- Born: 24 February 1944; Buffalo, New York, U.S.
- Died: 22 April 2026 (aged 82); Fairfax County, Virginia, U.S.
- Resting place: Arlington National Cemetery
- Education: BA - Canisius College; MA - Sophia University; PhD - University of Kansas
- Writing career
- Subjects: Imperial Japanese Army; Pacific War
- Notable awards: Samuel Eliot Morison Prize
- Military career
- Branch: United States Air Force
- Service years: 1967–1971
- Rank: Captain
- Conflicts: Vietnam War

Edward John Drea (24 February 1944 – 22 April 2026) was an American military historian who wrote about the Imperial Japanese Army and the Pacific War. After service with in the Vietnam War with the United States Air Force, he joined the Combat Studies Institute of the Command and General Staff College in Fort Leavenworth, Kansas in 1975, and later became the head of the Research and Analysis Department at the US Army Center for Military History. His works include MacArthur's ULTRA: Codebreaking and the War against Japan, 1942–1945 and three volumes of the Secretaries of Defense Historical Series.

== Early life and education ==
Edward John Drea was born in Buffalo, New York, on 24 February 1944. He attended local grammar and high schools, and then entered Canisius College in Buffalo, whert he earned a Bachelor of Arts degree in history.

== Career ==
On graduation, in 1967, Drea joined the United States Air Force. He was sent for officer training at the Air Force Officer Training School at the Medina Training Annex at Lackland Air Force Base in San Antonio, Texas, and then to Lowry Air Force Base in Denver, Colorado, where he was trained as an intelligence officer. He was posted to the headquarters of the Fifth Air Force at Fuchū in Japan, arriving on 20 January 1968, where he monitored communications from communist countries. The Pueblo Incident four days after he arrived resulted in a heavy workload.

Drea served a combat tour in Vietnam and was honorably discharged from the Air Force in 1971. That year, he entered the Sophia University in Tokyo on the G.I. Bill, earning a Master of Arts (M.A.) degree. Classes were taught in English and Japanese, and he became fluent in Japanese. While there, he met Kazuko, and they were married at the US Embassy in Tokyo in March 1971. He was awarded a Japanese ministry of education dissertation fellowship, which allowed him to gain a Doctor of Philosophy (PhD) in modern Japanese history from the University of Kansas in 1978, writing his thesis on "The Japanese General Election of 1942: a Study of Political Institutions in Wartime".

Drea joined the Combat Studies Institute of the Command and General Staff College in Fort Leavenworth, Kansas in 1975, and later became the head of the Research and Analysis Department at the US Army Center for Military History in Washington, D.C. He also taught at United States Army War College. He retired in 1997, but later worked in the Historical Office of the Office of the Secretary of Defense, where he authored or co-authred three volumes of the Secretaries of Defense Historical Series.

== Awards ==
In 2003, Drea received the Samuel Eliot Morison Prize for lifetime achievement from the Society for Military History. His book Japan's Imperial Army: Its Rise and Fall, 1853–1945 received the Society for Military History Distinguished Book Award. The edited volume The Battle for China: Essays on the Military History of the Sino-Japanese War of 1937–1945, co-edited by Drea, Mark R. Peattie, and Hans van de Ven, received the 2012 Society for Military History Distinguished Book Award in the non-U.S. category.

== Death ==
Drea's wife Kazuko died of complications due to cancer in 2013. Drea was diagnosed with lung cancer the following year. He subsequently developed atypical neurodegenerative diseases, and moved to a assisted living in 2024. He died from complication of his neurodegenerative diseases in a hospice in Fairfax County, Virginia on 22 April 2026 and was buried in Arlington National Cemetery.

== Bibliography ==
- — (1979). The 1942 Japanese General Election: Political Mobilization in Wartime Japan. Lawrence, Kansas: Center of East Asian Studies, University of Kansas. OCLC 5219120.
- — (1981). Nomonhan: Japanese-Soviet Tactical Combat, 1939. Fort Leavenworth, Kansas: Combat Studies Institute. ISBN 9781105650147. OCLC 936029327.
- — (1984). Defending the Driniumor: Covering Force Operations in New Guinea, 1944 (PDF). Fort Leavenworth, Kansas: Combat Studies Institute. OCLC 260179570.
- — (1992). MacArthur's ULTRA: Codebreaking and the War against Japan, 1942–1945. Lawrence, Kansas: University of Kansas Press. ISBN 9780700605040. OCLC 464001591.
- — (1998). In the Service of the Emperor: Essays on the Imperial Japanese Army. Lincoln, Nebraska: University of Nebraska Press. ISBN 9780803266384. OCLC 470201299.
- with Kaplan, Lawrence S.; Landa, Ronald D. (2006). The McNamara Ascendancy, 1961–1965. Washington D. C.: Office of Secretary of Defense. OCLC 226264386.
- — (2009). Japan's Imperial Army: Its Rise and Fall, 1853–1945. Modern War Studies. Lawrence, Kansas: University of Kansas Press. ISBN 9780700622344. OCLC 967353659.
- — (2011). McNamara, Clifford, and the Burdens of Vietnam, 1965–1969. Washington D. C.: Historical Office, Office of the Secretary of Defense. ISBN 9780160881350. OCLC 764691714.
- Peattie, Mark R.; Drea, Edward J.; Van de Ven, Hans, eds. (2011). The Battle for China: Essays on the Military History of the Sino-Japanese War of 1937–1945. Stanford, California: Stanford University Press. ISBN 9780804762069.
- with Cole, Ronald H.; Poole, Walter S.; Schnabel, James F.; Watson, Robert J.; Webb, Willard J. (2013). History of the Unified Command Plan 1946–2012. Washington D. C.: Joint History Office, Office of the Chairman of the Joint Chiefs of Staff. OCLC 836557655.
- — (2023). Spies in British Controlled Singapore: Policing the Japanese 1921–1941. Long Island, New York: Lived Places Publishing. ISBN 9781915271723. OCLC 1355072921.
