= USS Macdonough (DD-351) =

Farragut-class destroyer

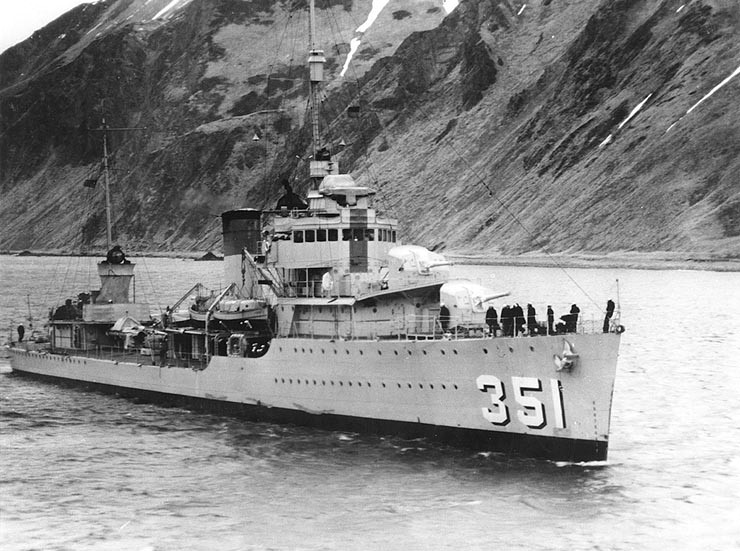
- USS Macdonough, 27 April 1937

History

United States
- Name: Macdonough (DD-351)
- Namesake: Thomas Macdonough
- Builder: Boston Navy Yard
- Laid down: 15 May 1933
- Launched: 22 August 1934
- Commissioned: 15 March 1935
- Decommissioned: 22 October 1945
- Stricken: 1 November 1945
- Fate: Sold for scrap, 20 December 1946

General characteristics
- Class & type: Farragut-class destroyer
- Displacement: 1,395 tons
- Length: 341 ft 4 in (104.04 m)
- Beam: 34 ft 3 in (10.44 m)
- Draft: 15 ft 6 in (4.72 m)
- Propulsion: Curtis geared turbines, twin screws; 21,400 shaft hp each
- Speed: 36 kn (67 km/h)
- Range: 6500 nmi at 12 knots (12,000 km at 22 km/h)
- Complement: 160 officers and enlisted
- Armament: As Built: 5 × 5"(127mm)/38cal DP (5×1), 8 × 21 inch (533 mm) T Tubes (2×4), 4 × .50cal (12.7mm) MG AA (4×1); c1943: 1 × Mk 33 Gun Fire Control System; 4 × 5" (127mm)/38cal DP (4×1), 8 × 21" (533 mm) T Tubes (2×4), 5 × Oerlikon 20 mm AA (5×1), 2 × Mk 51 Gun Directors; 4 × Bofors 40 mm AA (2×2), 2 × Depth Charge stern racks

The third USS Macdonough (DD-351) was a Farragut-class destroyer in the United States Navy during World War II. She was named for Thomas Macdonough.

== Construction and commissioning ==
Macdonough was laid down 15 May 1933 by the Boston Navy Yard; launched 22 August 1934; sponsored by Miss Rose Shaler Macdonough, granddaughter of Commodore Thomas Macdonough; and commissioned 15 March 1935.

== Pearl Harbor ==
Following an extensive shakedown cruise to Europe and western South America, Macdonough joined the Pacific Fleet and operated out of San Diego, California until 12 October 1939. She then shifted to a new home port, Pearl Harbor, as part of Destroyer Squadron 1. In port 7 December 1941 during the attack on Pearl Harbor, Macdonough downed one of the Japanese attack planes before heading out to sea to join others in the search for the Japanese task force. For the next 3½ months, the destroyer performed scouting assignments southwest of Oahu. Before returning to Pearl Harbor to escort convoys to and from west coast ports, she steamed as far as New Guinea, supporting airstrikes on Bougainville, Salamaua, and Lae.

== Guadalcanal ==
Macdonough returned to the western Pacific to prepare for the Guadalcanal invasion. Operating with Saratoga, she provided cover for the landings on Guadalcanal and Tulagi, 7 August 1942. She remained in the area, taking part in the Battle of Savo Island and fighting aircraft and shipping during the landing of reinforcements on the island. At the end of September, she commenced escort work between New Guinea, Espiritu Santo, and Pearl Harbor until reporting to Mare Island, 22 December, for overhaul.

== Aleutians Campaign ==
Macdonough next steamed north for the assault and occupation of Attu Island in the Aleutian Islands. Arriving at Adak, Alaska, 16 April 1943, the destroyer patrolled northeast of Attu until the assault. On 10 May, while maneuvering in heavy weather to guard the attack transports, she collided with Sicard and was forced to retire under tow. The ship remained in the repairs dock at Mare Island until 23 September, when she prepared to get underway for the Gilbert Islands. Arriving for the invasion of Makin Island, 20 November, she acted as control vessel for the landing craft, and following the completion of that phase of the operation, entered the lagoon to bombard Japanese installations. On 23 November Makin was declared secure and Macdonough returned to Pearl Harbor.

== Marshall Islands ==
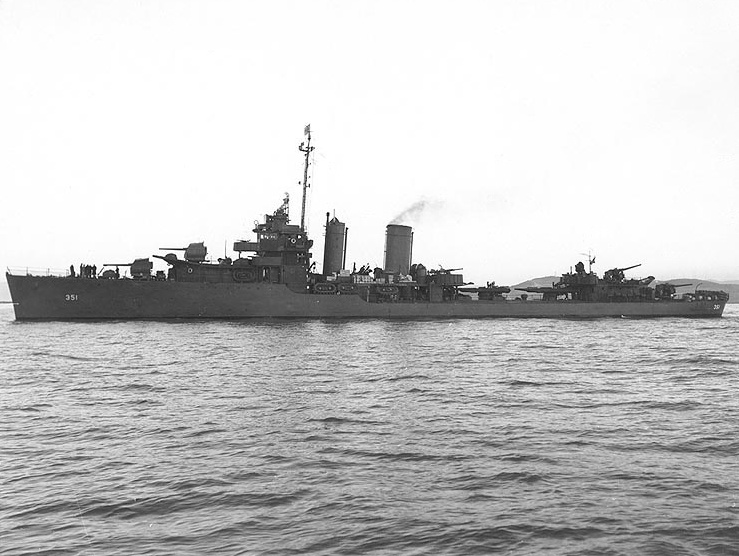
Macdonough in 1943.

In January 1944, she joined the Northern Attack Force staging for the assault on the Marshall Islands. As the primary fighter director ship for the initial transport group, Macdonough at first operated off Kwajalein Atoll. On 29 January, she proceeded to Wotje Atoll and participated in the shore bombardment there until returning to Kwajalein on the 31st for the occupation of Roi and Namur Islands. The destroyer then took up radar picket duties until proceeding on to Eniwetok Atoll.

On 21 and 22 February, Macdonough shelled Japanese positions on Parry Island at the deep entrance to Eniwetok lagoon. A month later, she was a reference and rendezvous ship for carrier TF 58, then striking the Palau Islands. Continuing her varied pace, she was at Hollandia, New Guinea, by 21 April, providing fire support for the landings there. Then, at the end of the mouth she steamed eastward to take up radar picket duty south of Truk. During this assignment, Macdonough, with the light aircraft carrier USS Monterey (CVL-26) and destroyer USS Stephen Potter (DD-538), sank the Japanese submarine Ro-45 on 30 April 1944.

== Marianas Campaign ==
On 4 May, the destroyer arrived at Majuro to join the forces gathering for the invasion of the Marianas. Departing the Marshalls 6 June, Macdonough operated with the fast carrier force during the Saipan invasion. She performed screening and picket duties and was part of the bombardment group firing on Japanese installations on the west side of the Island. She next took part in the Battle of the Philippine Sea, 19 to 20 June, firing at the few enemy planes which got through the combat air patrol. Ordered to Guam, she covered underwater demolition teams reconnoitering the beaches and provided harassing fire to prevent repairs to beach defenses on the island. On 21 July, the destroyer patrolled the waters off Guam to protect the assault craft from enemy submarines, continuing that role until departing for Hawaii 10 August.

== Philippines ==
After a brief stay at Pearl Harbor, Macdonough departed for the Admiralty Islands. She arrived at Manus on 15 September and commenced escort duties. On 14 October, she accompanied troop transports to Leyte and remained through the Battle of Leyte Gulf, 24 to 25 October. She then steamed back to Manus for another convoy to Leyte, 3 November, and upon her return to Philippine waters patrolled Leyte Gulf and the southern Surigao Strait area. The next mouth, Macdonough resumed escort duty. Operating out of Ulithi, she guarded fleet oilers on their refueling runs in the Philippine, Formosa, and South China Sea areas. In January 1945, the destroyer sailed for Puget Sound and a 3-month overhaul period. Returning to Ulithi, she was assigned to radar picket station off that island until 5 July, when she resumed screening convoys. For the remainder of the war, she protected Allied shipping between Ulithi and Okinawa.

== End of World War II and fate ==
At Guam when hostilities ended, Macdonough soon received orders to return to the United States. She arrived at San Diego 3 September, continuing on the next week to the New York Navy Yard, where she decommissioned 22 October 1945. On 20 December 1946, she was sold to George H. Nutman of Brooklyn, New York.

== Honors and awards ==
- Asiatic-Pacific Campaign Medal with 13 battle stars
- World War II Victory Medal

Macdonough received 13 battle stars for World War II service.
