= Ha-103 =

Ha-103 may refer to:

- Japanese submarine Ha-103, an Imperial Japanese Navy submarine in commission from February to September 1945
- Nakajima Ha103, an alternative name for the Nakajima Mamoru aircraft engine
