= Ha-111 =

Ha-111 may refer to:

- Japanese submarine Ha-111, an Imperial Japanese Navy submarine in commission from July to September 1945
- Mitsubishi Ha111, an alternative name for the Mitsubishi Kasei aircraft engine
