= Ha-101-class submarine =

Imperial Japanese Navy Submarine Class

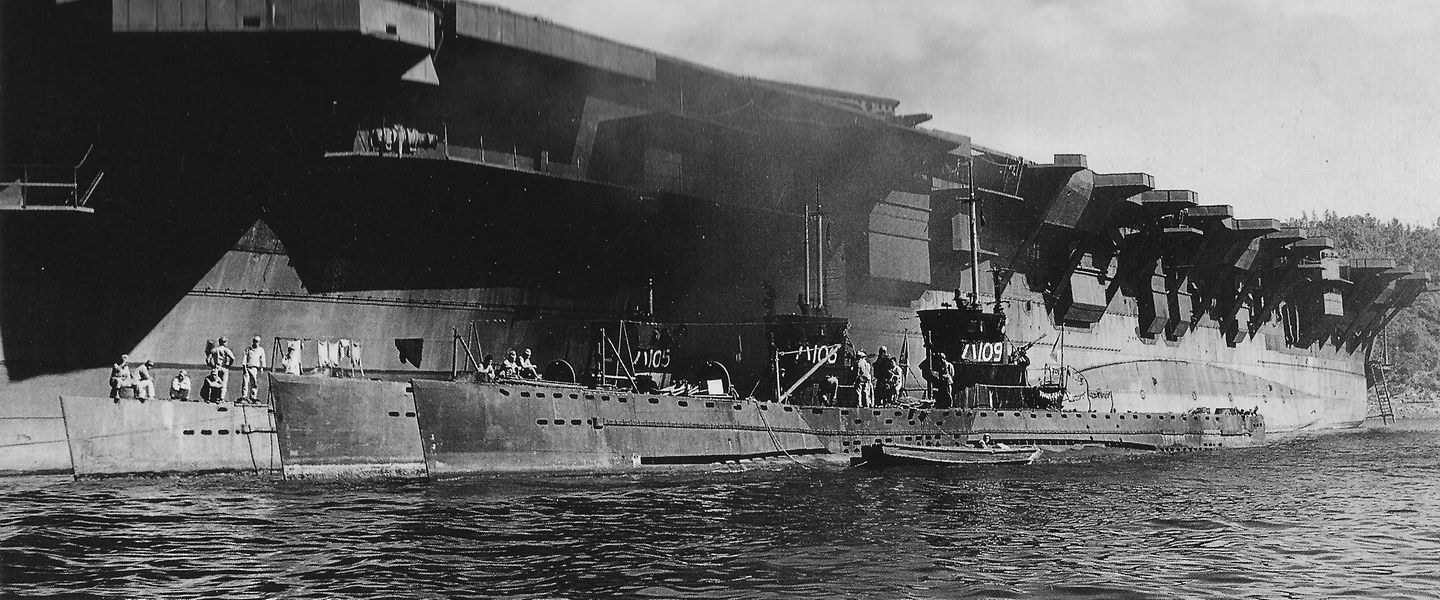
- (left to right) Ibuki, Ha-105, Ha-106 and Ha-109

Class overview
- Name: Ha-101-class submarine
- Builders: Kawasaki Shipbuilding; Mitsubishi Heavy Industries
- Operators: Imperial Japanese Navy
- Cost: 2,135,000 JPY
- Built: 1944–45
- In commission: 1944–45
- Planned: 12
- Completed: 10
- Scrapped: 10

General characteristics
- Type: Transport submarine
- Displacement: 436 t (429 long tons) surfaced; 501 t (493 long tons) submerged
- Length: 44.5 m (146 ft 0 in)
- Beam: 6.1 m (20 ft 0 in)
- Draft: 4.04 m (13 ft 3 in)
- Installed power: 400 bhp (300 kW) (diesels); 150 hp (110 kW) (electric motor)
- Propulsion: Diesel-electric; 1 × diesel engines; 1 × electric motor
- Speed: 10 knots (19 km/h; 12 mph) surfaced; 5 knots (9.3 km/h; 5.8 mph) submerged
- Range: 3,000 nmi (5,600 km; 3,500 mi) at 10 knots (19 km/h; 12 mph) surfaced; 46 nmi (85 km; 53 mi) at 2.3 knots (4.3 km/h; 2.6 mph) submerged
- Test depth: 100 meters (328 ft)
- Capacity: 60 metric tons (59 long tons)
- Complement: 22
- Armament: 1 × single 25 mm (1 in) Type 96 anti-aircraft gun

The Ha-101-class submarine (波百一型潜水艦, Ha-hyaku-ichi-gata Sensuikan) was a transport submarine built for the Imperial Japanese Navy (IJN) during World War II. The IJN planned to build 12 boats, but only 10 vessels were completed by the end of the war. The IJN called these submarines Sen'yu-Shō type submarine (潜輸小型潜水艦, Sen-Yu-Ko-gata sensuikan). The type name was shortened to Yusō Sensuikan Ko-gata (輸送潜水艦小型, Transport Submarine-Small Type).

Several boats were converted to tankers or mother ships for Kō-hyōteki model D "Kōryū" (甲標的丁型 蛟龍) midget submarines.

== Design and description ==
The Ha-101-class submarines were designed as small, cheap transport submarines to resupply isolated island garrisons. They displaced 436 metric tons (429 long tons) surfaced and 501 metric tons (493 long tons) submerged. The submarines were 44.5 meters (146 ft 0 in) long, had a beam of 6.1 meters (20 ft 0 in) and a draft of 4.04 meters (13 ft 3 in). They were designed to carry 60 metric tons (59 long tons) of cargo.

For surface running, the boats were powered by a single 400-brake-horsepower (298 kW) diesel engine that drove one propeller shaft. When submerged the propeller was driven by a 140-horsepower (104 kW) electric motor. They could reach 10 knots (19 km/h; 12 mph) on the surface and 5 knots (9.3 km/h; 5.8 mph) underwater. On the surface, the Ha-101s had a range of 3,000 nautical miles (5,600 km; 3,500 mi) at 10 knots (19 km/h; 12 mph); submerged, they had a range of 46 nmi (85 km; 53 mi) at 2.3 knots (4.3 km/h; 2.6 mph). The boats were armed a single mount for a 25 mm (1 in) Type 96 anti-aircraft gun.

== Planned construction ==
Project number S57. In February 1944, the IJN planned a small-size transport submarine, the IJA planned the Maru Yu.

== Boats ==
Boat #	Name	Builder	Laid down	Launched	Completed	Decommissioned	Fate
4601	Ha-101	Kawasaki-Senshū Shipyard, Kawasaki-Kōbe Shipyard	08-06-1944	22-08-1944	22-11-1944	15-09-1945	Converted to a tanker submarine in June 1945; scuttled off Shimizu City October 1945
4602	Ha-102	Kawasaki-Senshū Shipyard, Kawasaki-Kōbe Shipyard	08-06-1944	22-08-1944	06-12-1944	15-09-1945	Converted to a tanker submarine in June 1945; scuttled off Shimizu City October 1945
4603	Ha-103	Kawasaki-Senshū Shipyard, Kawasaki-Kōbe Shipyard	29-06-1944	21-10-1944	03-02-1945	30-11-1945	Converted to a radar picket submarine April 1945; re-converted to a tanker submarine in June 1945; scuttled off the Gotō Islands 01-04-1946
4604	Ha-104	Kawasaki-Kōbe Shipyard	01-07-1944	30-09-1944	01-12-1944	15-09-1945	Converted to a tanker submarine June 1945; scuttled off Shimizu City October 1945
4605	Ha-105	Kawasaki-Senshū Shipyard, Kawasaki-Kōbe Shipyard	29-06-1944	31-10-1944	19-02-1945	30-11-1945	Converted to a radar picket submarine in March or April 1945; re-converted to a tanker submarine in June 1945; scuttled off the Gotō Islands 01-04-1946
4606	Ha-106	Mitsubishi-Kōbe Shipyard	01-07-1944	30-10-1944	15-12-1944	30-11-1945	Converted to Kōryū mother ship June 1945; scuttled off the Gotō Islands 01-04-1946
4607	Ha-107	Mitsubishi-Kōbe Shipyard	01-08-1944	20-12-1944	20-03-1945	30-11-1945	Converted to Kōryū mother ship June 1945; scuttled off the Gotō Islands 01-04-1946
4608	Ha-108	Kawasaki-Senshū Shipyard, Kawasaki-Kōbe Shipyard	05-09-1944	28-12-1944	06-05-1945	30-11-1945	Converted to Kōryū mother ship June 1945; scuttled off the Gotō Islands 01-04-1946
4609	Ha-109	Mitsubishi-Kōbe Shipyard	01-08-1944	10-01-1945	10-03-1945	30-11-1945	Converted to Kairyu-class submarine's tender July 1945; scuttled off the Gotō Islands 01-04-1946
4610	Ha-110	Kawasaki-Senshū Shipyard, Kawasaki-Kōbe Shipyard	05-09-1944	12-01-1945			95% complete; scuttled in the Kii Channel 15-04-1946
4611	Ha-111	Mitsubishi-Kōbe Shipyard	16-11-1944	02-03-1945	13-07-1945	30-11-1945	scuttled off the Gotō Islands 01-04-1946
4612	Ha-112	Mitsubishi-Kōbe Shipyard	16-11-1944	15-04-1945			95% complete; scuttled in the Kii Channel 15-04-1946

== See also ==
- Type 4 Ka-Tsu
- Imperial Japanese Army Railways and Shipping Section
- Type 3 submergence transport vehicle, Yu II type

== Bibliography ==
- Bagnasco, Erminio (1977). Submarines of World War Two. Annapolis, Maryland: Naval Institute Press. ISBN 0-87021-962-6.
- Carpenter, Dorr B. & Polmar, Norman (1986). Submarines of the Imperial Japanese Navy 1904–1945. London: Conway Maritime Press. ISBN 0-85177-396-6.
- Chesneau, Roger, ed. (1980). Conway's All the World's Fighting Ships 1922–1946. Greenwich, UK: Conway Maritime Press. ISBN 0-85177-146-7.
- "Rekishi Gunzō"., History of Pacific War Extra, "Perfect guide, The submarines of the Imperial Japanese Forces", Gakken (Japan), March 2005, ISBN 4-05-603890-2
- Ships of the World special issue Vol.37, History of Japanese Submarines, "Kaijinsha"., (Japan), August 1993
- The Maru Special, Japanese Naval Vessels No.43 Japanese Submarines III, Ushio Shobō (Japan), September 1980, Book code 68343-43
- The Maru Special, Japanese Naval Vessels No.132 Japanese Submarines I "Revised edition", Ushio Shobō (Japan), February 1988, Book code 68344-36
- Senshi Sōsho Vol.88, Naval armaments and war preparation (2), "And after the outbreak of war", Asagumo Simbun (Japan), October 1975
