= DC4 =

DC4 may refer to:

- DC4 (mixtape), by Meek Mill
- Douglas DC-4, a propeller-driven airliner produced 1942-1947
- Douglas DC-4E, an experimental interwar airliner
- District of Columbia Route 4
- DC4 control code, see C0 and C1 control codes
