= Japanese submarine Ha-106 =

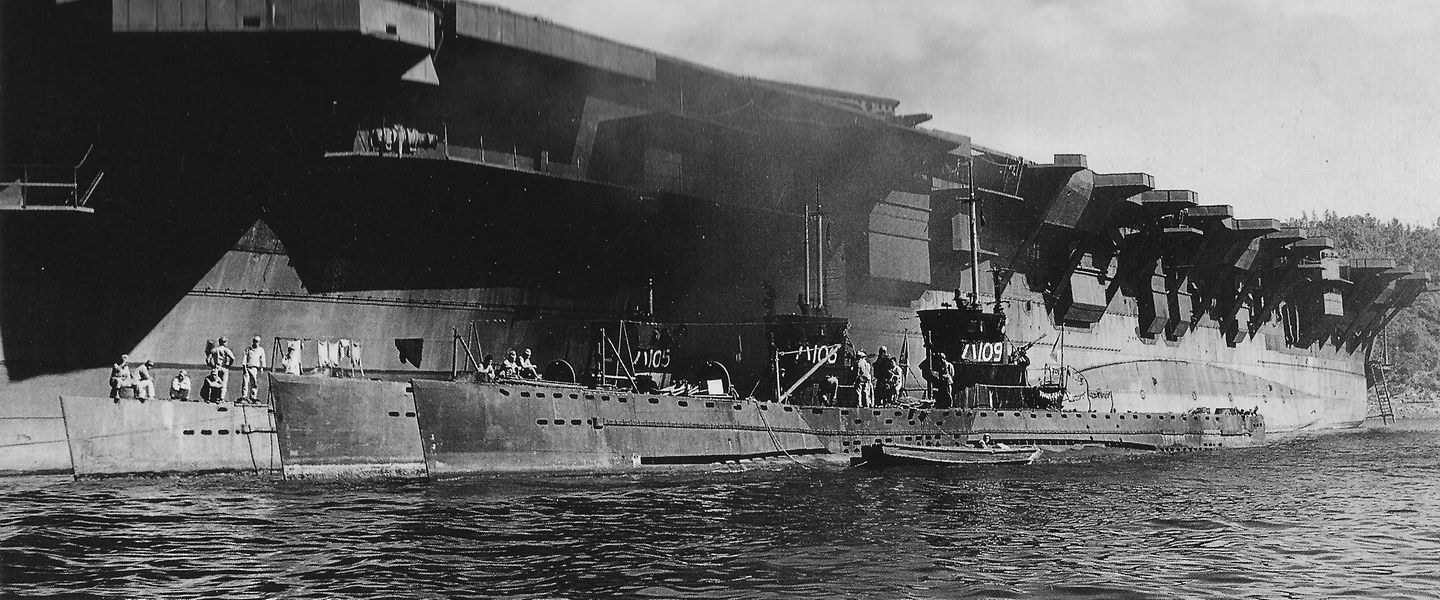
- Left to right, the Japanese aircraft carrier Ibuki and submarines Ha-105, Ha-106, and Ha-109 at Sasebo, Japan, in 1945.

History

Japan
- Name: Small Supply Submarine No. 4606
- Builder: Kawasaki, Senshu and Kobe, Japan
- Laid down: 1 July 1944
- Launched: 30 October 1944
- Renamed: Ha-106 on 30 October 1944
- Completed: 15 December 1944
- Commissioned: 15 December 1944
- Fate: Surrendered 2 September 1945; Stricken 30 November 1945; Scuttled 1 April 1946

General characteristics
- Type: Transport submarine
- Displacement: 436 t (429 long tons) surfaced; 501 t (493 long tons) submerged
- Length: 44.5 m (146 ft 0 in)
- Beam: 6.1 m (20 ft 0 in)
- Draft: 4.04 m (13 ft 3 in)
- Installed power: 400 bhp (300 kW) (diesels); 150 hp (110 kW) (electric motor)
- Propulsion: Diesel-electric; 1 × diesel engines; 1 × electric motor
- Speed: 10 knots (19 km/h; 12 mph) surfaced; 5 knots (9.3 km/h; 5.8 mph) submerged
- Range: 3,000 nmi (5,600 km; 3,500 mi) at 10 knots (19 km/h; 12 mph) surfaced; 46 nmi (85 km; 53 mi) at 2.3 knots (4.3 km/h; 2.6 mph) submerged
- Test depth: 100 meters (328 ft)
- Capacity: 60 metric tons (59 long tons)
- Complement: 22
- Armament: 1 × single 25 mm (1 in) Type 96 anti-aircraft gun

Ha-106 was an Imperial Japanese Navy Ha-101-class submarine. Completed and commissioned in December 1944, she served during the final months of World War II, participating in training activities and performing rescue duty off Japan for Japanese aircrews who came down at sea. She surrendered at the end of the war in September 1945 and was scuttled in April 1946.

== Design and description ==
The Ha-101-class submarines were designed as small, cheap transport submarines to resupply isolated island garrisons. They displaced 436 metric tons (429 long tons) surfaced and 501 metric tons (493 long tons) submerged. The submarines were 44.5 meters (146 ft 0 in) long, had a beam of 6.1 meters (20 ft 0 in) and a draft of 4.04 meters (13 ft 3 in). They were designed to carry 60 metric tons (59 long tons) of cargo.

For surface running, the boats were powered by a single 400-brake-horsepower (298 kW) diesel engine that drove one propeller shaft. When submerged the propeller was driven by a 140-horsepower (104 kW) electric motor. They could reach 10 knots (19 km/h; 12 mph) on the surface and 5 knots (9.3 km/h; 5.8 mph) underwater. On the surface, the Ha-101s had a range of 3,000 nautical miles (5,600 km; 3,500 mi) at 10 knots (19 km/h; 12 mph); submerged, they had a range of 46 nmi (85 km; 53 mi) at 2.3 knots (4.3 km/h; 2.6 mph). The boats were armed a single mount for a 25 mm (1 in) Type 96 anti-aircraft gun.

== Construction and commissioning ==
Ha-106 was laid down on 1 July 1944 by Kawasaki at Senshu, Japan, as Small Supply Submarine No. 4606. She was launched on 30 October 1944 and was named Ha-106 that day. She subsequently was towed to the Kawasaki shipyard at Kobe, Japan, for fitting-out. She was completed and commissioned at Kobe on 15 December 1944.

== Service history ==
Upon commissioning, Ha-106 was attached to the Kure Naval District and assigned to Submarine Squadron 11 for workups. On 30 December 1944, she was reassigned to the Grand Escort Command, and after that she served in the Seto Inland Sea as a target for antisubmarine warfare training for kaibokan escort ship crews. On 20 January 1945, she participated in torpedo attack training with the aircraft carrier Hōshō and aircraft of the Imperial Japanese Navy Air Service′s 453rd Naval Air Group.

On 5 March 1945, Ha-106 was assigned directly to the headquarters of the 5th Air Fleet. She departed Kanoya, Japan, on 8 March 1945 to support Operation Tan No. 2 — a long-range kamikaze mission directed at the Allied naval fleet anchorage at Ulithi Atoll — by operating off Minamidaitōjima as to rescue Japanese aircrews who ditched at sea during the operation. Reassigned to Submarine Division 33 for training purposes on 10 March 1945, she took part in Operation Tan No. 2 on 11 March. Records do not indicate whether she rescued any downed aircrews, but she did return to Kanoya that day, then resumed her operations off Minamidaitōjima for two more days of rescue duty. She wrapped up her participation in Operation Tan No. 2 with her arrival at Kanoya on 13 March 1945.

In April 1945, Ha-106 began conversion to a submarine tender for midget submarines. During August 1945, she moved to the Ourazaki area near Kure, Japan, where she began preparations for a one-way mission from Saeki, Japan, to attack Allied ships. She then proceeded to Kure.

Hostilities between Japan and the Allies ended on 15 August 1945, and on 2 September 1945, Ha-105 surrendered to the Allies at Kure. On 2 November 1945, she was reassigned to Japanese Submarine Division Two under United States Navy command along with her sister ships Ha-103, Ha-105, Ha-107, Ha-108, Ha-109, and Ha-111. In November 1945, the U.S. Navy ordered all Japanese submarines at Kure, including Ha-106, to move to Sasebo, Japan.

== Disposal ==
The Japanese struck Ha-106 from the Navy list on 30 November 1945. She was among a number of Japanese submarines the U.S. Navy scuttled off the Goto Islands near Sasebo in Operation Road's End on 1 April 1946. She was lashed to the submarine I-36, and the two submarines were sunk together at 15:58 just beyond the 100-fathom (600 ft; 183 m) line at 32°37′N 129°17′E.
