= Japanese submarine Ha-109 =

Submarine in the Imperial Japanese Navy

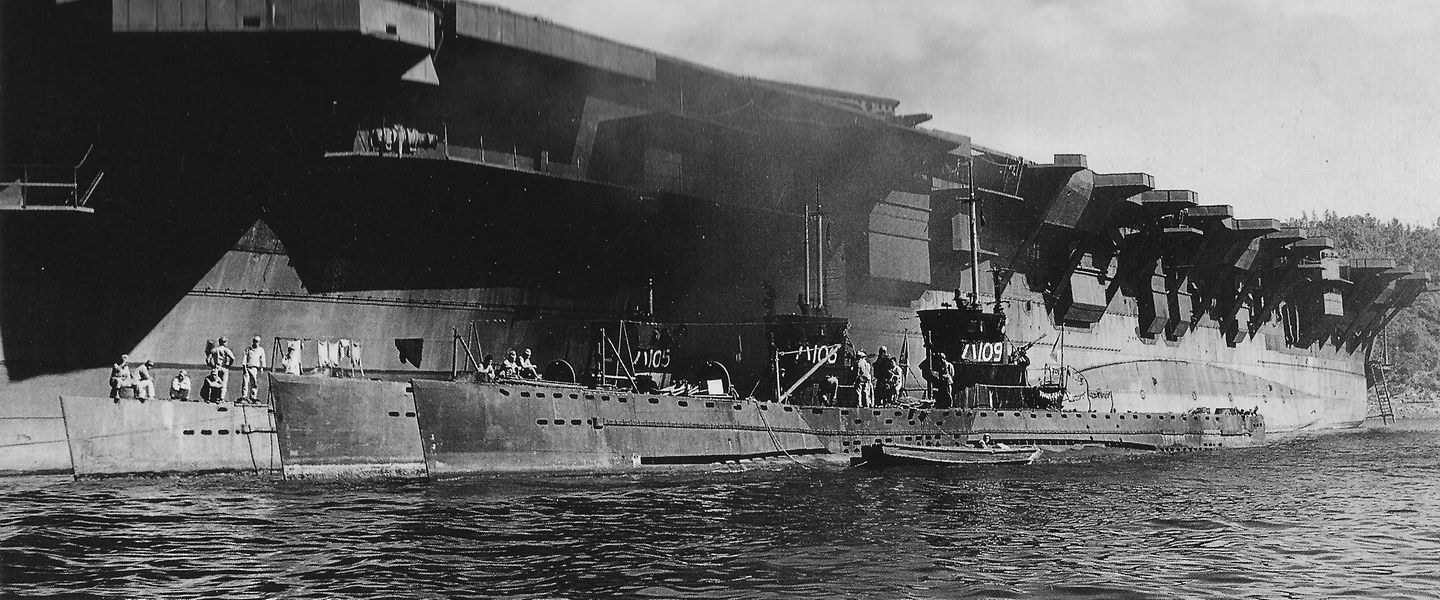
- Left to right, the Japanese aircraft carrier Ibuki and submarines Ha-105, Ha-106, and Ha-109 at Sasebo, Japan, in 1945.

History

Japan
- Name: Small Supply Submarine No. 4609
- Builder: Mitsubishi, Kobe, Japan
- Laid down: 1 August 1944
- Renamed: Ha-109
- Launched: 10 January 1945
- Completed: 10 March 1945
- Commissioned: 10 March 1945
- Fate: Surrendered 2 September 1945; Stricken 30 November 1945; Scuttled 1 April 1946

General characteristics
- Type: Transport submarine
- Displacement: 436 t (429 long tons) surfaced; 501 t (493 long tons) submerged
- Length: 44.5 m (146 ft 0 in)
- Beam: 6.1 m (20 ft 0 in)
- Draft: 4.04 m (13 ft 3 in)
- Installed power: 400 bhp (300 kW) (diesels); 150 hp (110 kW) (electric motor)
- Propulsion: Diesel-electric; 1 × diesel engines; 1 × electric motor
- Speed: 10 knots (19 km/h; 12 mph) surfaced; 5 knots (9.3 km/h; 5.8 mph) submerged
- Range: 3,000 nmi (5,600 km; 3,500 mi) at 10 knots (19 km/h; 12 mph) surfaced; 46 nmi (85 km; 53 mi) at 2.3 knots (4.3 km/h; 2.6 mph) submerged
- Test depth: 100 meters (328 ft)
- Capacity: 60 metric tons (59 long tons) cargo (as designed); 10 x 450-millimeter (17.7 in) torpedoes (as completed)
- Complement: 22
- Armament: 1 × single 25 mm (1 in) Type 96 anti-aircraft gun

Ha-109 was an Imperial Japanese Navy Ha-101-class submarine. Completed as a transport submarine, she was converted into a submarine tender for midget submarines. She served during the final months of World War II, surrendered at the end of the war in September 1945, and was scuttled in April 1946.

== Design and description ==
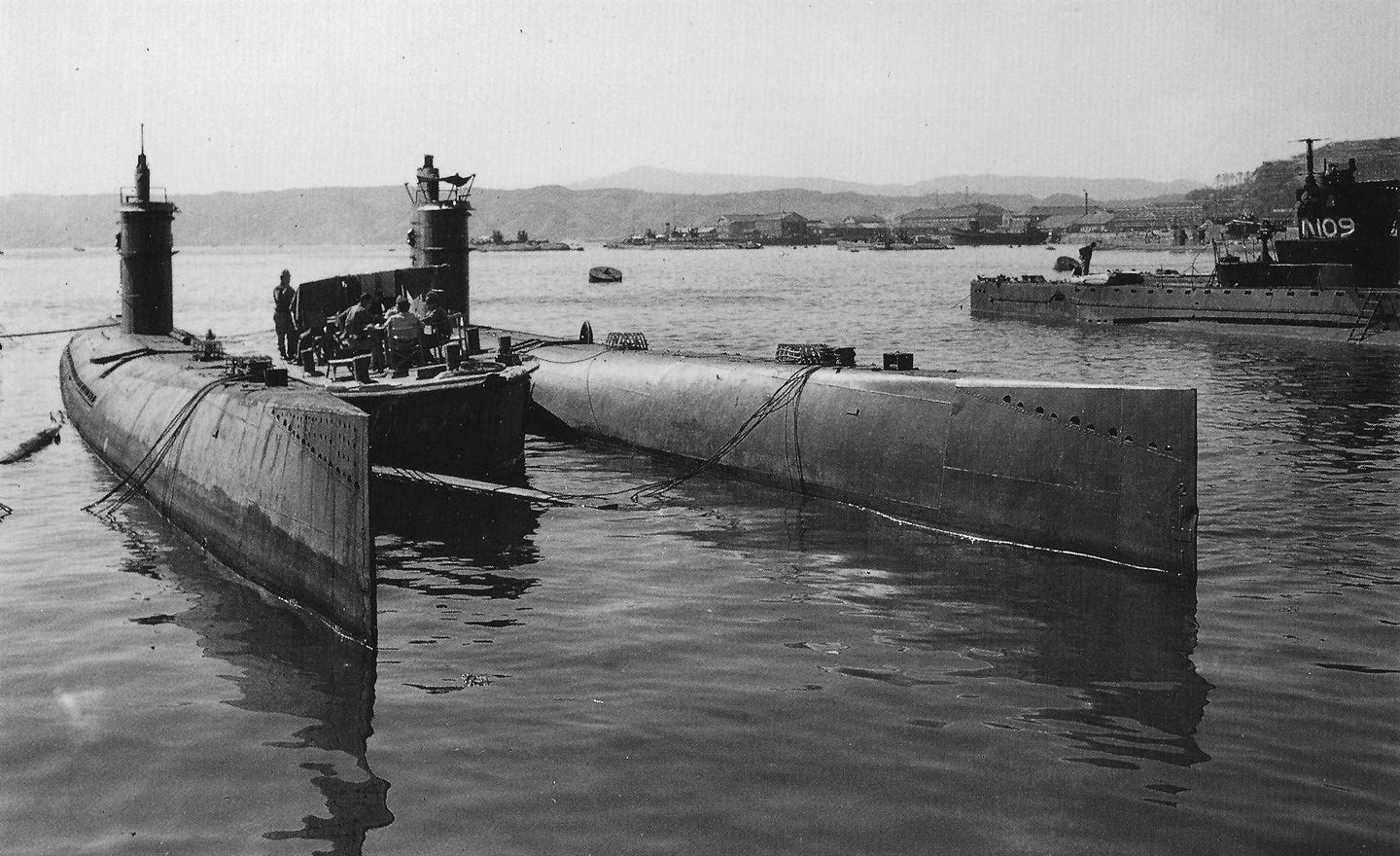
Ha-109 (right) with the submarines Ha-204 (left) and Ha-203 (center) at Kure, Japan, on 16 October 1945.

The Ha-101-class submarines were designed as small, cheap transport submarines to resupply isolated island garrisons. They displaced 436 metric tons (429 long tons) surfaced and 501 metric tons (493 long tons) submerged. The submarines were 44.5 meters (146 ft 0 in) long, had a beam of 6.1 meters (20 ft 0 in) and a draft of 4.04 meters (13 ft 3 in). They were designed to carry 60 metric tons (59 long tons) of cargo.

For surface running, the boats were powered by a single 400-brake-horsepower (298 kW) diesel engine that drove one propeller shaft. When submerged the propeller was driven by a 140-horsepower (104 kW) electric motor. They could reach 10 knots (19 km/h; 12 mph) on the surface and 5 knots (9.3 km/h; 5.8 mph) underwater. On the surface, the Ha-101s had a range of 3,000 nautical miles (5,600 km; 3,500 mi) at 10 knots (19 km/h; 12 mph); submerged, they had a range of 46 nmi (85 km; 53 mi) at 2.3 knots (4.3 km/h; 2.6 mph). The boats were armed a single mount for a 25 mm (1 in) Type 96 anti-aircraft gun.

== Construction and commissioning ==
Ha-109 was laid down on 1 August 1944 by Mitsubishi at Kobe, Japan, as Small Supply Submarine No. 4609. Renamed Ha-109, she was launched on 10 January 1945. She was completed and commissioned on 10 March 1945.

== Service history ==
Upon commissioning, Ha-109 was attached to the Kure Naval District and assigned to Submarine Squadron 11 for workups. On 20 March 1945, however, she was reassigned to the 10th Special Attack Unit and began conversion to a submarine tender for midget submarines, the conversion involving modifying her cargo hold to accommodate ten 450-millimeter (17.7 in) torpedoes for midget submarines.

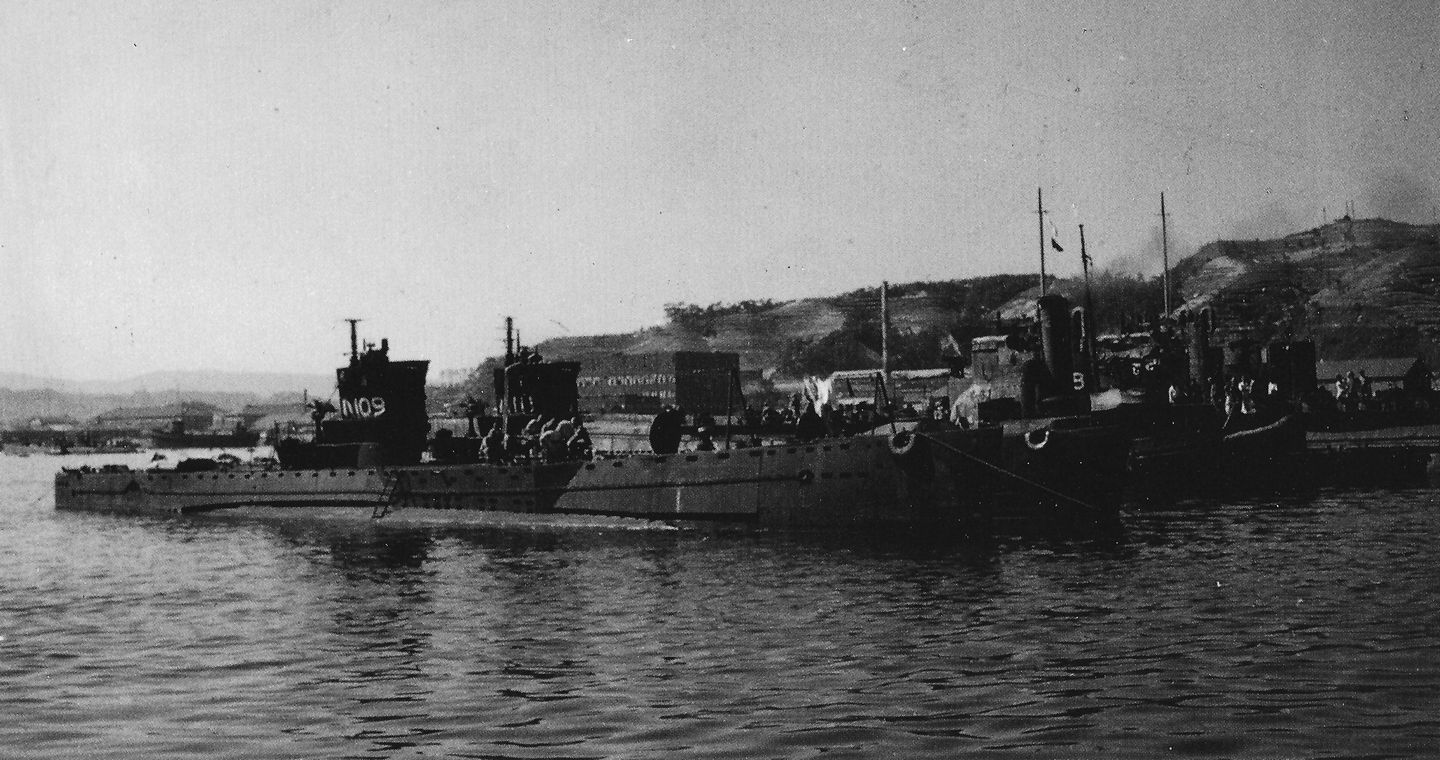
Ha-109 (left) and Ha-111 (right) at Kure, Japan, on 16 October 1945.

Ha-109 was in Saeki Bay at Matsuura, Japan, when hostilities between Japan and the Allies ended on 15 August 1945. Upon receiving the news that day, her crew destroyed her secret documents and distributed some of the food and fuel on board to local fishermen. In late August 1945, she proceeded from Saeki Bay to Kure, Japan, her crew throwing all of her ammunition and the torpedoes in her hold overboard during the voyage. Only a skeleton crew consisting of her commanding officer and seven crewmen remained aboard after her arrival at Kure on 24 August 1945. She surrendered to the Allies at Kure on 2 September 1945.

On 2 November 1945, Ha-109 was reassigned to Japanese Submarine Division Two under United States Navy command along with her sister ships Ha-103, Ha-105, Ha-106, Ha-107, Ha-108, and Ha-111. In November 1945, the U.S. Navy ordered all Japanese submarines at Kure, including Ha-109, to move to Sasebo, Japan.

== Disposal ==
The Japanese struck Ha-109 from the Navy list on 30 November 1945. She was among a number of Japanese submarines the U.S. Navy scuttled off the Goto Islands near Sasebo in Operation Road's End on 1 April 1946, sinking just beyond the 100-fathom (600 ft; 183 m) line at 32°37′N 129°17′E.
