= Mitsubishi Shinten =

1930s Japanese piston aircraft engine

Shinten
- Type: 14-cylinder air-cooled two-row radial piston engine
- National origin: Japan
- Manufacturer: Mitsubishi Aircraft Company
- Major applications: Mitsubishi Ki-21, Yokosuka H5Y
- Manufactured: 1934–1937
- Number built: 113
- Developed from: Mitsubishi Kinsei (A4)
- Developed into: Mitsubishi Kasei, Mitsubishi Zuisei

The Mitsubishi Shinten (震天, Quaking Sky) was a two-row, 14-cylinder air-cooled radial engine built by the Mitsubishi Aircraft Company for the Imperial Japanese Army Air Service (IJAAS) and the Imperial Japanese Navy Air Service (IJNAS) in the early 1930s. Like many aircraft engines in Japan, there were multiple designations for this engine. The company model designation was A6(7) while it was an experimental engine project. Once accepted, it was known as the "Shinten" or MK1 by the IJNAS, and Ha6 by the IJAAS.

== Design and development ==
The Mitsubishi Shinten was a development of the early Mitsubishi Kinsei (A4) engine. The stroke of the Kinsei was increased from 150 mm (5.91 in) to 160 mm (6.30 in) on the Shinten model 11 and to 170 mm (6.69 in) on the Shinten model 21 and 21Kai designs.

Lengthening the stroke increased the displacement from the Kinsei's 32.3 L (1,970 cu in) to 36.1 L (2,200 cu in) for the Shinten model 11. The increased displacement raised the horsepower from 1,070 hp (1,080 PS) to 1,200 hp (1,200 PS) at take-off power.

Initially the Ha6 was to be installed on the IJAAS Mitsubishi Ki-21 bomber aircraft, but it was decided to use a competing engine, the Nakajima Ha5 instead. Furthermore, Mitsubishi was ordered to produce Nakajima's engine at its factory under license. So only 113 Shinten/Ha6 engines were made and they were installed on only few types of aircraft.

In order to beat the rival and also to develop a more powerful engine for the new Navy Attack Bomber that became the infamous Mitsubishi G6M Betty, the Shinten was developed into the Mitsubishi Kasei by increasing the bore from 140 mm (5.51 in) to 150 mm (5.91 in) which in turn brought the displacement to 42 L (2,600 cu in) and increased power to 1,500 hp (1,500 PS).

=== IJNAS engine naming method ===
It was the Imperial Japanese Navy's common practice to refer to its engines by name. The Japanese method of identifying model numbers of aircraft engines is unique in that the model number always has two digits and may be followed by one or more letters. The first digit represents the major version of the engine and the second number represents the minor version of that model engine.

The first model number assigned to an engine is always 11, meaning the first major design and first minor version of that design. A major change to the design increments the first number and resets the second number to one. A minor change to the engine model increments the second number by one. If a very minor change is made, suffix letters are added after the model number. When a special modification is made, the model number is followed by the suffix 'kai', as in the Shinten Model 21kai, which decodes as the second model of the Shinten engine, 1st revision, specially modified.

=== IJAAS engine naming method ===
The Imperial Japanese Army Air Service referred to its engines by their engine (Japanese:Hatsudoki abbreviated Ha) model number. Ha numbers were assigned in sequence as the engine design was accepted. This engine (Ha6) would be the 6th engine accepted by the IJAAS.

== Variants ==
Shinten 11 (A7)
920 hp at 2300 rpm (take-off), 700 hp at 2100 rpm (normal). 1934 4 made
Shinten 21 (A6)
950 hp at 2320 rpm (take-off), 800 hp at 2150 rpm (normal).
Shinten 21kai (A6)
1200 hp at 2360 rpm (take-off), 1020 hp at 2250 rpm (normal). 1934–1939 109 made

== Applications ==
- Mitsubishi Ki-21
- Yokosuka H5Y

== Specifications (Shinten) ==
Data from World Encyclopedia of Aero Engines, 5th Edition.

=== General characteristics ===
- Type: 14-cylinder, supercharged, air-cooled, two-row radial piston engine
- Bore: 140 mm
- Stroke: 170 mm
- Displacement: 36.7 L
- Diameter: 1,309 mm
- Dry weight: 603 kg

=== Components ===
- Valvetrain: push rod operated overhead-valve system with 2 valves per cylinder
- Supercharger: Centrifugal one-speed single stage
- Cooling system: Air-cooled
- Reduction gear: 0.625

=== Performance ===
- Compression ratio: 6.0

== See also ==
Comparable engines

- Mitsubishi Kinsei
- Mitsubishi Kasei
- Nakajima Ha-5

Related lists

- List of aircraft engines
