= Ibuki-class cruiser =

Japanese class of cruisers

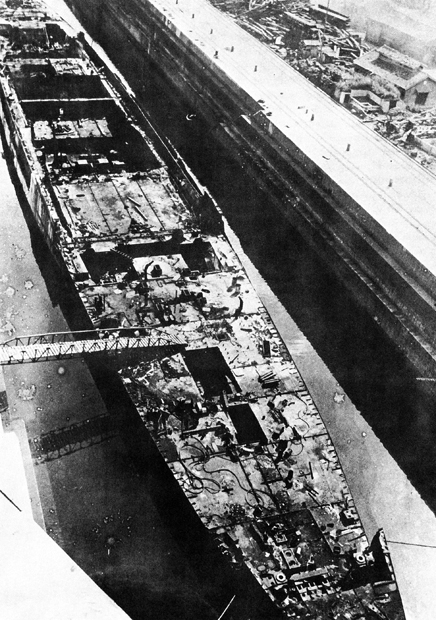
- Ibuki being scrapped in drydock, 14 March 1947

Class overview
- Name: Ibuki class
- Builders: Kure Naval Arsenal; Mitsubishi Heavy Industries, Nagasaki
- Operators: Imperial Japanese Navy
- Preceded by: Tone class
- Succeeded by: None
- Cost: ¥60,000,000
- Built: 1942–1945
- Planned: 2
- Completed: 0
- Scrapped: 2

General characteristics (as designed)
- Type: Heavy cruiser
- Displacement: 12,220 t (12,030 long tons) (standard); 14,828 t (14,594 long tons) (full load)
- Length: 200.6 m (658 ft 2 in)
- Beam: 20.2 m (66 ft 3 in)
- Draft: 6.04 m (19 ft 10 in)
- Installed power: 8 × water-tube boilers; 152,000 shp (113,000 kW)
- Propulsion: 4 × shafts; 4 × geared steam turbines
- Speed: 35 knots (65 km/h; 40 mph)
- Range: 6,300 nmi (11,700 km; 7,200 mi) at 18 knots (33 km/h; 21 mph)
- Complement: 876
- Sensors & processing systems: 1 × Type 2, Mark 2, Model 1 air search radar; 1 × Type 93 hydrophone system
- Armament: 5 × twin 20 cm (8 in) guns; 4 × twin 12.7 cm (5 in) AA guns; 4 × twin 2.5 cm (1 in) AA guns; 2 × twin 13.2 mm (0.52 in) Type 93 machine guns; 4 × quadruple 61 cm (24 in) torpedo tubes
- Armor: Waterline belt: 30–140 mm (1.2–5.5 in); Deck: 35–60 mm (1.4–2.4 in); Gun turrets: 25 mm (1 in); Barbettes: 25–100 mm (1.0–3.9 in); Conning tower: 100 mm
- Aircraft carried: 3
- Aviation facilities: 2 aircraft catapults

The Ibuki-class (伊吹型, Ibuki-gata) cruisers were the last class of heavy cruisers built for the Imperial Japanese Navy (IJN). In order to save design time, the ships were essentially repeats of the earlier Mogami class. Begun during World War II, only the lead ship, Ibuki, was launched, but she was in the process of being converted into a light aircraft carrier when construction was suspended in 1945. She was scrapped the following year. The unnamed second ship was scrapped less than a month after being laid down in order to clear her slipway for an aircraft carrier.

== Design and description ==
The design of the Ibuki class was a minor improvement over the last pair of the Mogami class after those ships had been upgraded during the late 1930s. The main improvement was the replacement of the triple torpedo tube mounts in the older ships with quadruple mounts. They cost 60,000,000 yen each and had a crew of 54 officers and 822 enlisted men.

The ships had a length of 200.6 meters (658 ft 2 in) overall. They had a beam of 20.2 meters (66 ft 3 in) and a draft of 6.04 meters (19 ft 10 in). They displaced 12,220 metric tons (12,030 long tons) at standard load and 14,828 metric tons (14,594 long tons) at (full load).

They were fitted with four Kampon geared steam turbine sets with a total of 152,000 shaft horsepower (113,000 kW), each driving a 3.9-meter (13 ft) propeller. Steam was provided by eight Kampon Ro Gō-type three-drum water-tube boilers that operated at a pressure of 22 kg/cm^{2} (2,157 kPa; 313 psi) and temperature of 300 °C (572 °F). The ships had a designed speed of 35 knots (65 km/h; 40 mph). They carried 2,163 tonnes (2,129 long tons) of fuel oil which gave them an estimated range of 6,300 nautical miles (11,700 km; 7,200 mi) at 18 knots (33 km/h; 21 mph). Electrical power was supplied by three 300-kilowatt (400 hp) turbo generators and two 200-kilowatt (270 hp) diesel generators.

=== Armament ===
The main armament of the Ibuki class was intended to be ten 50-caliber 20 cm 3rd Year Type No. 2 guns mounted in twin turrets, three forward and two aft of the superstructure, numbered one through five from the bow to the stern. The first two forward turrets were on the same level, but the third turret could superfire over the first two. The guns could depress to −5° and had a maximum elevation of 55°. They fired 125.85-kilogram (277.5 lb) projectiles at a muzzle velocity of 840 m/s (2,800 ft/s). They had a maximum range of 29,400 yd (26,900 m) at an elevation of 45° and the ship carried 128 rounds per gun. The secondary armament was to consist of eight 40-caliber 12.7 cm Type 89 anti-aircraft (AA) guns in twin mounts. They fired 23.45-kilogram (51.7 lb) projectiles at a rate between 8 and 14 rounds per minute at a muzzle velocity of 700–725 m/s (2,300–2,380 ft/s); at 45°, this provided a maximum range of 14,800 meters (16,200 yd), and a maximum ceiling of 9,400 meters (30,800 ft). The ships were also intended to be equipped with four twin 25 mm Type 96 light AA guns abreast the funnel. They fired .25-kilogram (0.55 lb) projectiles at a muzzle velocity of 900 m/s (3,000 ft/s); at 50°, this provided a maximum range of 7,500 meters (8,202 yd), and an effective ceiling of 5,500 meters (18,000 ft). The maximum effective rate of fire was only between 110 and 120 rounds per minute due to the frequent need to change the fifteen-round magazines. Two twin 13.2 mm Type 93 machine gun mounts were supposed to be mounted on the bridge with 2,000 rounds per gun.

The Ibuki-class ships were intended to be armed with four rotating quadruple 61 cm (24 in) Type 92 torpedo tubes, two on each broadside. The ship carried 24 Type 93 torpedoes, 16 in the tubes and 8 in reserve. Quick-reloading gear was installed for every mount that allowed the reserve torpedoes to be loaded in three to five minutes in ideal conditions. The Type 93 torpedo, fueled by compressed oxygen and widely referred to in post-war literature as the "Long Lance", had three range/speed settings. It had a range of 20,000 meters (22,000 yd) at a speed of 48 knots (89 km/h; 55 mph), 32,000 meters (35,000 yd) at 40 knots (74 km/h; 46 mph), or 40,000 meters (44,000 yd) at a speed of 36 knots (67 km/h; 41 mph). Before Ibuki was launched, one proposal was made to replace the aircraft and their equipment with five quintuple Type 0 torpedo tube mounts. Two of these would be mounted on each side and the last on the centerline, but nothing was done.

=== Fire control, sensors and aircraft ===
Two Type 94 fire-control directors, one atop the bridge and the other abaft the funnel, were going to be fitted to control the main guns. They used range data received from three 8-meter (26 ft 3 in) coincidence rangefinders. Two of these were to be installed in turrets Nos. 3 and 4 while the primary rangefinder was mounted above the bridge. A pair of Type 94 high-angle directors, one on each side of the bridge, were intended to control the Type 89 guns. Each director was fitted with a 4.5-meter (14 ft 9 in) rangefinder. The 25 mm guns would have been controlled by two Type 95 directors mounted on the bridge.

Early warning would have been provided by a Type 2, Mark 2, Model 1 air search radar mounted at the top of the foremast. A Type 93 passive hydrophone system would have been fitted in the bow. The ships were designed to carry three aircraft on a platform between the funnel and the mainmast. These would have consisted of one three-seat Aichi E13A and two two-seat Yokosuka E14Y floatplanes. They would have been launched by a pair of Kure Type 2 aircraft catapults, one on each side of the aircraft platform. The ships would have carried a total of 122 powder charges for the catapults as well as four 250-kilogram (550 lb) bombs for the aircraft.

=== Armor ===
The ships' armor scheme was only slightly modified from the Mogami-class cruisers. Their waterline armoured belt extended all the way down to the double bottom. It extended from the forward to the rear magazines below the fore and aft turrets and was angled inwards at the top 20° from the vertical to improve its resistance to horizontal shellfire. Over the machinery spaces, it was 100 millimeters (3.9 in) thick at the top and tapered to 30 millimeters (1.2 in) at the bottom. The outer ends of the fore and aft machinery compartments was protected by a 105-millimeter (4.1 in) transverse bulkhead. On the sides of the magazines, the belt was 140 millimeters (5.5 in) thick and tapered to 30 mm at the bottom. The magazines were protected by fore and aft transverse bulkheads 95–140 millimeters (3.7–5.5 in) thick. The steering gear and the rudder compartments had sides that consisted of 100-millimeter (3.9 in) plates and their ends were protected by 50 millimeters (2 in) of armor.

The deck above the steering gear and rudders was 30 millimeters (1.2 in) thick. The thickness of the armored deck ranged from 35–40 millimeters (1.4–1.6 in) on the flat and 60 millimeters (2.4 in) on the slope. The sides of the conning tower were 100 millimeters thick while its roof was 50 millimeters thick. The main gun turrets had 25 millimeters (1 in) of armor on all sides and on the roof. The barbette armor ranged from 25 to 100 millimeters (1.0 to 3.9 in) in thickness. The ammunition hoists for the secondary armament were protected by 75 to 100 millimeters (3.0 to 3.9 in) of armor. The funnel uptakes were provided with 70 to 95 millimeters (2.8 to 3.7 in) of armor. There was no separate anti-torpedo bulkhead as that function was performed by the lower extension of the belt armor.

== Ships ==
The two Ibuki-class cruisers were ordered in November 1941 as part of the IJN's Rapid Naval Armaments Supplement Programme. Both ships were laid down without names, just as Warships No. 300 and No. 301, but the former was named Ibuki on 5 April 1943.

Construction data
	Builder	Laid down	launched	Notes	Fate
Ibuki	Kure Naval Arsenal, Kure	24 April 1942	21 May 1943	Converted to a light aircraft carrier, December 1943	Scrapped, 22 September 1946
No. 301	Mitsubishi Heavy Industries, Nagasaki	1 June 1942			Scrapped, 30 June 1942

No. 301 was ordered scrapped less than a month after she was laid down in order to clear her slipway for the carrier Amagi which was laid down on 1 October 1942. After her launch, the construction of Ibuki was suspended in July 1943 while her fate was discussed. A possible conversion to a fast oiler was considered until the Navy decided on 25 August to convert her to a light aircraft carrier at Sasebo Naval Arsenal. Work on the conversion did not begin until the incomplete hull was towed to Sasebo on 21 December. It was originally intended to complete her in March 1945, but this was extended until August. Construction was suspended on 16 March, when the ship was about 80% complete, to allow for the construction of small submarines. Ibuki was scrapped at Sasebo from 22 November 1946 to 1 August 1947.
