= Kawanishi E15K Shiun =

Japanese reconnaissance floatplane

E15K Shiun
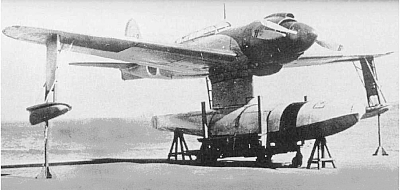
- A Shiun on land

General information
- Type: Reconnaissance floatplane
- Manufacturer: Kawanishi Aircraft Company
- Primary user: Imperial Japanese Navy
- Number built: 15

History
- First flight: 5 December 1941

The Kawanishi E15K Shiun (紫雲, Violet Cloud) was a single-engined reconnaissance floatplane designed and manufactured by the Japanese aircraft manufacturer Kawanishi Aircraft Company. Active during World War II, the Allied reporting name for the type was "Norm" (after Squadron Leader Norman O. Clappison of the RAAF, member of the ATAIU).

Development of the E15K was launched in 1939 at the behest of the Imperial Japanese Navy (IJN), which sought a high performance reconnaissance floatplane capable of evading Allied land-based fighters to used onboard a new generation of cruisers being constructed for the service. Kawanishi's design team opted to make use of several unorthodox features, including Contra-rotating propellers, a laminar flow airfoil, and a partially-jettisonable retractable float system, to achieve the desired performance. The latter proved to be problematic in real world operations, often failing to deploy or to jettison - the former caused multiple accidents while the latter made the aircraft unable to escape from combat. The retractable float mechanism was replaced by a fixed arrangement, necessitating the use of the more powerful Mitsubishi MK4S Kasei 24 to compensate for higher than expected drag.

The first prototype performed its maiden flight on 5 December 1941; late-stage development was protracted due to issues encountered. The E15K became operational on 30 April 1944 and deployed to Palau Island two months later. The floatplane's performance was underwhelming, partially due to failures of the float system. Production of the E15K had already been terminated on February 1944.

== Design and development ==
In 1939, the Imperial Japanese Navy (IJN) instructed the Kawanishi Aircraft Company to develop a twin-seat high-speed reconnaissance floatplane; requirements included sufficient performance to escape interception as well as a range of 800 nautical miles. Atypically, 14-Shi specification accompanying this instruction departed from the established convention of a list of strict performance metrics and requirements; instead, the company was simply informed that the envisioned floatplane would need to be capable of outperforming enemy land-based fighters. IJN planners intended to use the type aboard its new class of cruisers, intended to act as a flagship for groups of submarines, operating six of the new floatplanes to find targets. The first of these new cruisers, Ōyodo, was also ordered in 1939.

An E15K taxiing on the water, 1942

In response, Kawanishi designed a single-engined, low-wing monoplane, which was initially designated K-10 under a recently-established Service Aeroplane Development Programme. To achieve the sought performance, Kawanishi's design team chose to incorporate several novel or unorthodox features. The K-10 was powered by a 1,460 hp (1,090 kW) Mitsubishi MK4D Kasei 14 14-cylinder radial engine, which drove a pair of contra-rotating twin-bladed propellers, which was the first installation of contra-rotating propellers produced in Japan. In order to reduce drag, the K-10 was furnished with a laminar flow airfoil section that had been indigenously developed by the Tokyo Imperial University.

A key feature of the floatplane was an unconventional float system, which comprised a single main float located directly under the fuselage and a pair of stabilizing floats beneath the wings. The main float was installed on a cantilever pylon and, via the removal of a single pin, could be jettisoned in case of emergency, which provided a sufficient increase in speed (estimated as approximately 50 knots (90 km/h)) to permit the type to escape enemy fighters. The stabilizing floats, which comprised a metal planing lower section and inflatable fabric upper section, were designed to retract into the wing during flight and inflate when extended. If the central float had been jettisoned during a flight, the stabilizing floats would remain retracted during the landing and function as flotation aids.

Construction of the first prototype, designated E15K1 under the IJN's short designation system, was protracted due to engineering difficulties. On 5 December 1941, the first prototype conducted its maiden flight. While the aircraft's flying characteristics were deemed to be acceptable, however, the pitch control system for the contra-rotating propellers proved to be problematic. The flight test programme was protracted on account of the E15K1's advanced features, which led to the project fell behind schedule. In October 1942, the first prototype was delivered to the IJN, however, it was extensively damaged due to a failure of the flaps that prevented the deployment of the retracted stabilizing floats. It was not the only accident to be attributed to the floats being unable to lower for landing, which led to the retractable arrangement was eventually abandoned. In response, the stabilizing floats were fixed in place and the more powerful Mitsubishi MK4S Kasei 24 engine was adopted, the latter being necessary to compensate for the increased drag.

== Operational history ==
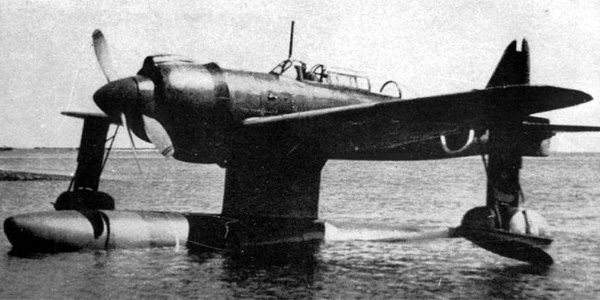
An E-15K on the water, circa 1940

Despite the development problems, the E15K1 was ordered into limited production as the Navy Type 2 High-speed Reconnaissance Seaplane Shiun Model 11. Six prototype and service trial E15Ks were built and evaluated between 1941 and 1942. Quantity production of the type finally got underway in 1943. However, the first operational E15K1s did not enter service until 30 April 1944, at which point six aircraft were assigned to the 12th Reconnaissance Squadron of the 61st Air Flotilla.

On 1 June 1944, the first Shiuns arrived at Palau Island in the South Pacific. By that time, new Allied fighters of much higher performance, specifically the Grumman F6F Hellcat, had entered service. Furthermore, the Shiun's main float jettison mechanism, which had been wind tunnel-tested but never trialled on an actual aircraft prior to manufacture, failed to work in combat conditions, contributing to the aircraft being downed due to being too slow while the float was still attached. Armed with only a 7.7 mm machine gun while lacking armour and possessing unprotected fuel tanks, the type proved to be no match for Allied fighters. Coupled with high maintenance and other mechanical issues experienced, further production of the type was cancelled in February 1944, leading to only fifteen Shiun ever being completed - including the six prototypes.

== Variants ==
- E15K1

Single-engined reconnaissance floatplane. Production version.

== Operators ==
Japan

- Imperial Japanese Navy Air Service

== Specifications (E15K1 late production) ==
Head-on view of an E-15K

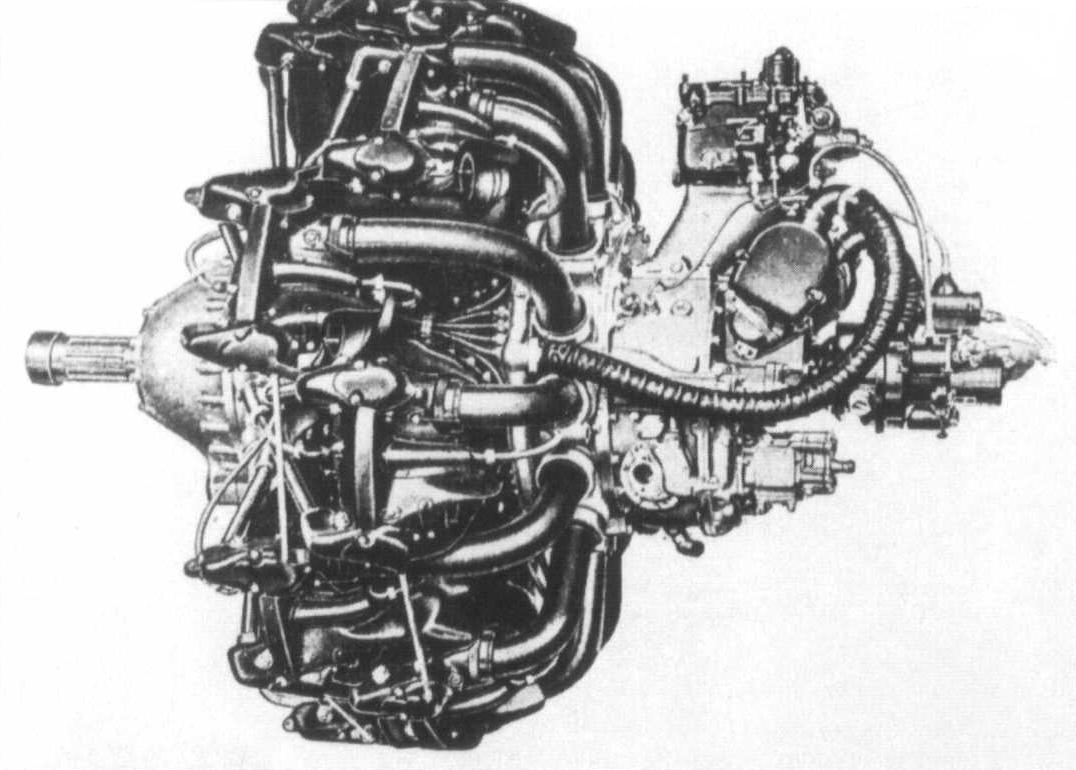
Mitsubishi Kasei two-row 14-cylinder radial engine

Data from Japanese Aircraft of the Pacific War

General characteristics

- Crew: 2
- Length: 11.587 m (38 ft 0 in)
- Wingspan: 14 m (45 ft 11 in)
- Height: 4.95 m (16 ft 3 in)
- Wing area: 30 m^{2} (320 sq ft)
- Empty weight: 3,165 kg (6,978 lb)
- Gross weight: 4,100 kg (9,039 lb)
- Max takeoff weight: 4,900 kg (10,803 lb)
- Powerplant: 1 × Mitsubishi MK4S Kasei 24 14-cylinder air-cooled radial piston engine, 1,380 kW (1,850 hp) for take-off

- 1,250 kW (1,680 hp) at 2,100 m (6,900 ft)
- 1,150 kW (1,540 hp) at 5,500 m (18,000 ft)

- Propellers: 4-bladed contra-rotating constant-speed propeller

Performance

- Maximum speed: 469 km/h (291 mph, 253 kn) at 5,700 m (18,700 ft) with float
- Cruise speed: 296 km/h (184 mph, 160 kn) at 2,500 m (8,200 ft)
- Range: 3,371 km (2,095 mi, 1,820 nmi)
- Service ceiling: 9,830 m (32,250 ft)
- Time to altitude: 6,000 m (20,000 ft) in ten minutes
- Wing loading: 136.7 kg/m^{2} (28.0 lb/sq ft)
- Power/mass: 0.335 kW/kg (0.204 hp/lb)

Armament

- Guns:
- 1 × 7.7 mm (0.303 in) Type 92 machine gun in rear cockpit

== See also ==
Related lists

- List of military aircraft of Japan
- List of flying boats and floatplanes
