= Nakajima Mamoru =

1940s Japanese piston aircraft engine

Mamoru
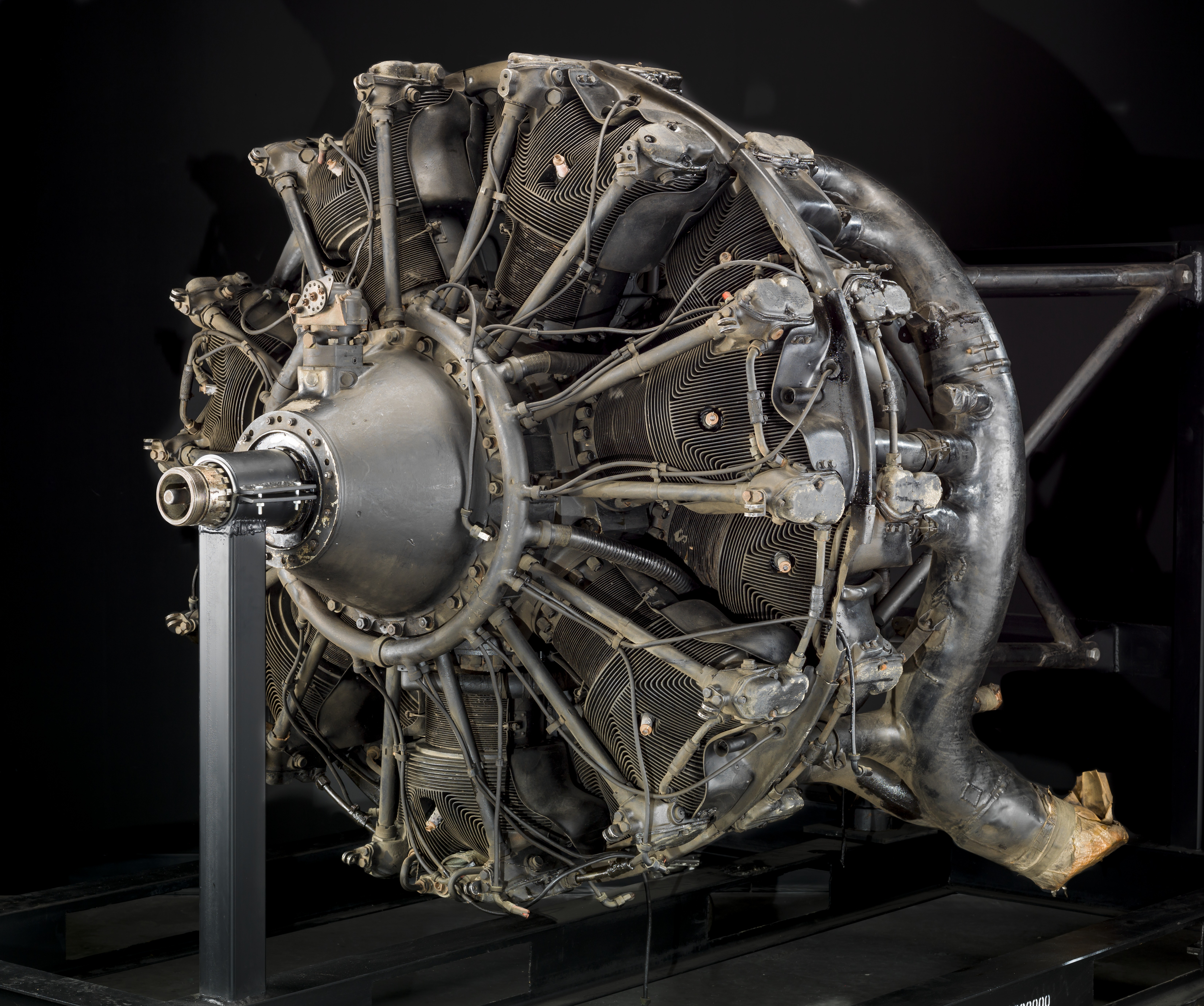
- Nakajima Mamoru engine at the National Air and Space Museum
- Type: Piston aircraft engine
- Manufacturer: Nakajima Aircraft Company
- Designer: Kiyoshi Tanaka
- First run: 1941
- Major applications: Nakajima G5N, Nakajima B6N
- Number built: 200
- Developed from: Nakajima Hikari
- Developed into: Ha-107, Ha-117, Ha-217

The Nakajima Mamoru (護, Preserve) engine was a 14-cylinder, air-cooled, two-row radial engine of 1870 hp. The Nakajima model designation for this engine was NAK while it was an experimental project, in service it was known as the NK7, and known as the Ha-103 by the Army and "Mamori" or "Mamoru" by the Navy. According to unified designation code it was Ha-36. The meanings of these two Japanese words are very similar, Mamori translates as 'protection' and Mamoru, translates as 'to guard, protect, defend and obey'.

At some 44.9 litres (2,740 in^{2}) displacement, it was one of the largest-displacement 14-cylinder radial engines in the world, rivalling the similar configuration American 42.7 litre (2,600 in^{2}) Wright R-2600 Twin Cyclone engine, of Soviet 41.2 litre (2,515 in^{2}) Shvetsov ASh-82 engine of displacement levels, and was meant to compete with early 18-cyl engines, like the 53.6 L Bristol Centaurus.

Competing against the successful Mitsubishi Kasei engine, the Mamoru proved to be unreliable and was rarely able to operate near its design power. Designs based on the Mamoru were forced to use other engines, typically the less powerful Mitsubishi Kasei or the Nakajima Homare. Production of the Mamoru was ended by the Navy after only a few hundred production examples were built.

== Design and development ==
The Mamoru was Nakajima's seventh air-cooled design, which led to its designation: N for Nakajima, K for air-cooled, 7 for the 7th design, and A for the major model number. Two sub-models were built with minor changes, the Model 11 for the Navy, and the Model 12 for the Army. Both produced 1,850 hp

The first application of the Mamoru was on the first prototype of the Nakajima G5N1 Genzan. The G5N1 had been designed on the basis of the Douglas DC-4E as Japan's first four-engine bomber and proved to be a disappointment. These problems were compounded by the unreliability of the early Mamoru engines, which had to be de-tuned and left the G5N1 underpowered. The G5N1's maiden flight was on 10 April 1941, and a further four prototypes were built with the Mamoru. In an attempt to salvage the project, two additional airframes were fitted with 1,530 hp Mitsubishi MK4B 12 Kasei engines and redesignated G5N2s. Although the Mitsubishi engines were more reliable than the original Mamoru 11s, further development was halted. Of the six completed Shinzans, four of them (two G5N2s and two G5N1s re-engined with the Kasei 12) were relegated for use as long-range Navy transports under the designation Shinzan-Kai Model 12 Transport G5N2-L.

The Nakajima Mamoru was also used on the Nakajima B6N Tenzan ('heavenly mountain') carrier based torpedo bomber aircraft. The Navy requested this aircraft based on the Kasei, but Nakajima's Kenichi Matsumara insisted on using their Mamoru. The B6N first flew on 14 March 1941, demonstrating several problems, notably the poor engine reliability. With the delay of 2 years, by 1943 the engine had improved to the point where serial production was allowed to start, but after only 133 B6N1s had been delivered the Navy ordered the switch to the 1,850 hp (1380 kW) Mitsubishi MK4T Kasei 25. The rest of the 1,268 B6N2s were Kasei powered.

== Variants ==
Mamoru 11 NK7A
1,870 horsepower (1,390 kW) at 2,600 rpm (take-off)
1,750 horsepower (1,300 kW), 2,500 rpm at 1,400 metres (4,600 ft)
1,600 horsepower (1,200 kW), 2,500 rpm at 4,900 metres (16,100 ft)
Mamoru 12 Ha-103
As NK7A

== Applications ==
- Nakajima B6N 1 X 1,870 hp (1395 kW) Nakajima NK7A Mamoru 11
- Nakajima G5N 4 X 1,870 hp (1395 kW) Nakajima NK7A Mamoru 11
- Nakajima Ki-49 2 X 1,870 hp Nakajima Ha-103
- Mitsubishi Ki-67 (prototype) 2 X 1,870 hp Nakajima Ha-103

== Specifications (Nakajima NK7A Mamoru type 11, 12) ==
Data from Francillon p. 433

=== General characteristics ===
- Type: 14-cylinder supercharged, air-cooled two-row radial piston engine
- Bore: 155 mm (6.1 in.)
- Stroke: 170 mm (6.7 in.)
- Displacement: 44.9 L (2,740 cu in)
- Diameter: 1,380 mm (54.3 in.)
- Dry weight: 870-903 kg (1,918-1,991 lb.)

=== Components ===
- Valvetrain: Pushrod operated overhead-valve system with 4 valves per cylinder
- Supercharger: Two-speed single stage centrifugal
- Cooling system: Air-cooled
- Reduction gear: 0.578

=== Performance ===
- Power output: takeoff: 1,870 hp at 2,600 rpm, cruise: 1,750 hp at 2,500 rpm at 1,400 m
- Compression ratio: 6.5

== See also ==
Comparable engines

- BMW 801
- Mitsubishi Kasei
- Pratt & Whitney R-2800
- Wright R-2600

Related lists

- List of aircraft engines
