= Japanese submarine Ha-108 =

Imperial Japanese Navy Submarine

History

Japan
- Name: Small Supply Submarine No. 4608
- Builder: Kawasaki, Senshu and Kobe, Japan
- Laid down: 5 September 1944
- Launched: 28 December 1944
- Renamed: Ha-108 on 28 December 1944
- Completed: 6 May 1945
- Commissioned: 6 May 1945
- Fate: Surrendered 2 September 1945; Stricken 30 November 1945; Scuttled 1 April 1946

General characteristics
- Type: Transport submarine
- Displacement: 436 t (429 long tons) surfaced; 501 t (493 long tons) submerged
- Length: 44.5 m (146 ft 0 in)
- Beam: 6.1 m (20 ft 0 in)
- Draft: 4.04 m (13 ft 3 in)
- Installed power: 400 bhp (300 kW) (diesels); 150 hp (110 kW) (electric motor)
- Propulsion: Diesel-electric; 1 × diesel engines; 1 × electric motor
- Speed: 10 knots (19 km/h; 12 mph) surfaced; 5 knots (9.3 km/h; 5.8 mph) submerged
- Range: 3,000 nmi (5,600 km; 3,500 mi) at 10 knots (19 km/h; 12 mph) surfaced; 46 nmi (85 km; 53 mi) at 2.3 knots (4.3 km/h; 2.6 mph) submerged
- Test depth: 100 meters (328 ft)
- Capacity: 60 metric tons (59 long tons) cargo (as designed); 10 x 450-millimeter (17.7 in) torpedoes (as completed)
- Complement: 22
- Armament: 1 × single 25 mm (1 in) Type 96 anti-aircraft gun

Ha-108 was an Imperial Japanese Navy Ha-101-class submarine. Designed as a transport submarine, she was completed and commissioned in May 1945 as a submarine tender for midget submarines. She served during the final months of World War II, surrendered at the end of the war in September 1945, and was scuttled in April 1946.

== Design and description ==
The Ha-101-class submarines were designed as small, cheap transport submarines to resupply isolated island garrisons. They displaced 436 metric tons (429 long tons) surfaced and 501 metric tons (493 long tons) submerged. The submarines were 44.5 meters (146 ft 0 in) long, had a beam of 6.1 meters (20 ft 0 in) and a draft of 4.04 meters (13 ft 3 in). They were designed to carry 60 metric tons (59 long tons) of cargo.

For surface running, the boats were powered by a single 400-brake-horsepower (298 kW) diesel engine that drove one propeller shaft. When submerged the propeller was driven by a 140-horsepower (104 kW) electric motor. They could reach 10 knots (19 km/h; 12 mph) on the surface and 5 knots (9.3 km/h; 5.8 mph) underwater. On the surface, the Ha-101s had a range of 3,000 nautical miles (5,600 km; 3,500 mi) at 10 knots (19 km/h; 12 mph); submerged, they had a range of 46 nmi (85 km; 53 mi) at 2.3 knots (4.3 km/h; 2.6 mph).

The boats were armed a single mount for a 25 mm (1 in) Type 96 anti-aircraft gun.

== Construction and commissioning ==
Ha-108 was laid down on 5 September 1944 by Kawasaki at Senshu, Japan, as Small Supply Submarine No. 4608. She was launched on 28 December 1944 and was named Ha-108 that day. She subsequently was towed to Kawasaki's shipyard at Kobe, Japan, for fitting-out. Prior to completion, she was converted from a transport submarine to a submarine tender for midget submarines, the conversion involving the reconstruction of her cargo hold to allow her to carry ten 450-millimeter (17.7 in) torpedoes for midget submarines and a tripod hoist aft so that she could handle them. Her fitting-out and conversion were completed on 6 May 1945, and she was commissioned at Kobe that day.

== Service history ==
Upon commissioning, Ha-108 was assigned to Submarine Division 33 in the Kure Submarine Squadron for workups. Hostilities between Japan and the Allies ended on 15 August 1945, and on 2 September 1945, Ha-108 surrendered to the Allies at Maizuru, Japan. On 2 November 1945, she was reassigned to Japanese Submarine Division Two under United States Navy command along with her sister ships Ha-103, Ha-105, Ha-106, Ha-107, Ha-109, and Ha-111. In November 1945, the U.S. Navy ordered Ha-108 to move to Sasebo, Japan.

== Disposal ==
The Japanese struck Ha-108 from the Navy list on 30 November 1945. She was among a number of Japanese submarines the U.S. Navy scuttled off the Goto Islands near Sasebo in Operation Road's End on 1 April 1946, sinking just beyond the 100-fathom (600 ft; 183 m) line at 32°37′N 129°17′E.
