= Nakajima G5N Shinzan =

Heavy bomber in Japan

G5N Shinzan
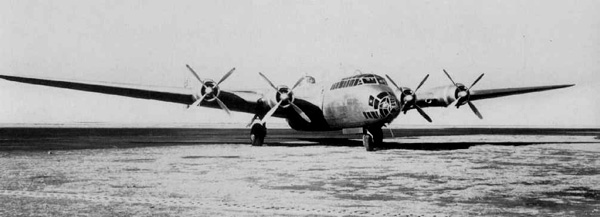
- A Nakajima G5N2 Shinzan Kai

General information
- Type: Heavy bomber
- National origin: Japan
- Manufacturer: Nakajima Aircraft Company
- Status: Retired
- Primary user: Imperial Japanese Navy Air Service
- Number built: 6 (2 of G5N1 & 4 of G5N2)

History
- First flight: 8 April 1941
- Retired: 1945
- Developed from: Douglas DC-4E

The Nakajima G5N Shinzan (深山, deep mountain) was a four-engined, long-range heavy bomber designed and built for the Imperial Japanese Navy prior to World War II. The Navy designation was "Experimental Type 13 Attack Bomber"; the Allied code name was "Liz".

== Design and development ==
The Nakajima G5N Shinzan originated due to the Imperial Japanese Navy's interest in developing a long-range attack bomber capable of carrying heavy loads of bombs or torpedoes a minimum distance of 3,000 nmi (5,600 km; 3,500 mi). To meet this requirement, it became apparent a four-engine lay-out would be necessary. As Japanese aircraft manufacturers lacked experience in building such large, complex aircraft, the Navy was forced to search for a suitable, existing, foreign-made model upon which to base the new design. It settled on the American Douglas DC-4E airliner. In 1939, the sole prototype of this airliner (previously rejected by American airline companies) was purchased by Nippon Koku K.K (Japan Airlines Co) and clandestinely handed over to the Nakajima Aircraft Company for dismantling and inspection.

The design that emerged from this study was for an all-metal, mid-wing monoplane with fabric-covered control surfaces, powered by four 1,530 hp Mitsubishi MK4B Kasei 12 air-cooled radial engines driving four-bladed propellers. A long ventral bomb-bay, glazed nose, and twin tailfins, replacing the DC-4E's distinctive triple rudder, were included. The DC-4E's retractable tricycle undercarriage was retained, as well as the original wing form and powerplant arrangement. Defensive armament comprised two 20 mm Type 99 Model 1 autocannon (one in a power-operated dorsal and one in a tail turret), plus single-mount, hand-operated 7.7 mm Type 92 machine guns in the nose, ventral, and waist positions.

The first prototype G5N1 made its maiden flight on 8 April 1941. However, overall performance proved disappointingly poor due to a combination of excessive weight, the low power of the Kasei engines, and the complexity of the design. Only one additional prototype was completed. In an attempt to salvage the project, four additional airframes were built and fitted with 1,870 hp Nakajima NK7A Mamori 11 engines and redesignated G5N2. Although the Nakajima engines were more powerful than the original Kasei 12s, their unreliability and the aircraft’s increased weight led to the termination of further development.

== Operational history ==
Of the six completed Shinzans, four were relegated for use as long-range Navy transports under the designation G5N2-L Shinzan-Kai Transport. The Allies allocated the code-name "Liz" to the aircraft, in the expectation it would be used as a bomber.

== Pop culture ==
A G5N prototype is featured the 2026 film Godzilla Minus Zero. Returned by the US, it is used by the Japanese in their initial attempts to defeat King Ghidorah, first with a fuel-air bomb then with lighting rods.

== Variants ==
G5N1 (right) and G8N1 Renzan (left).

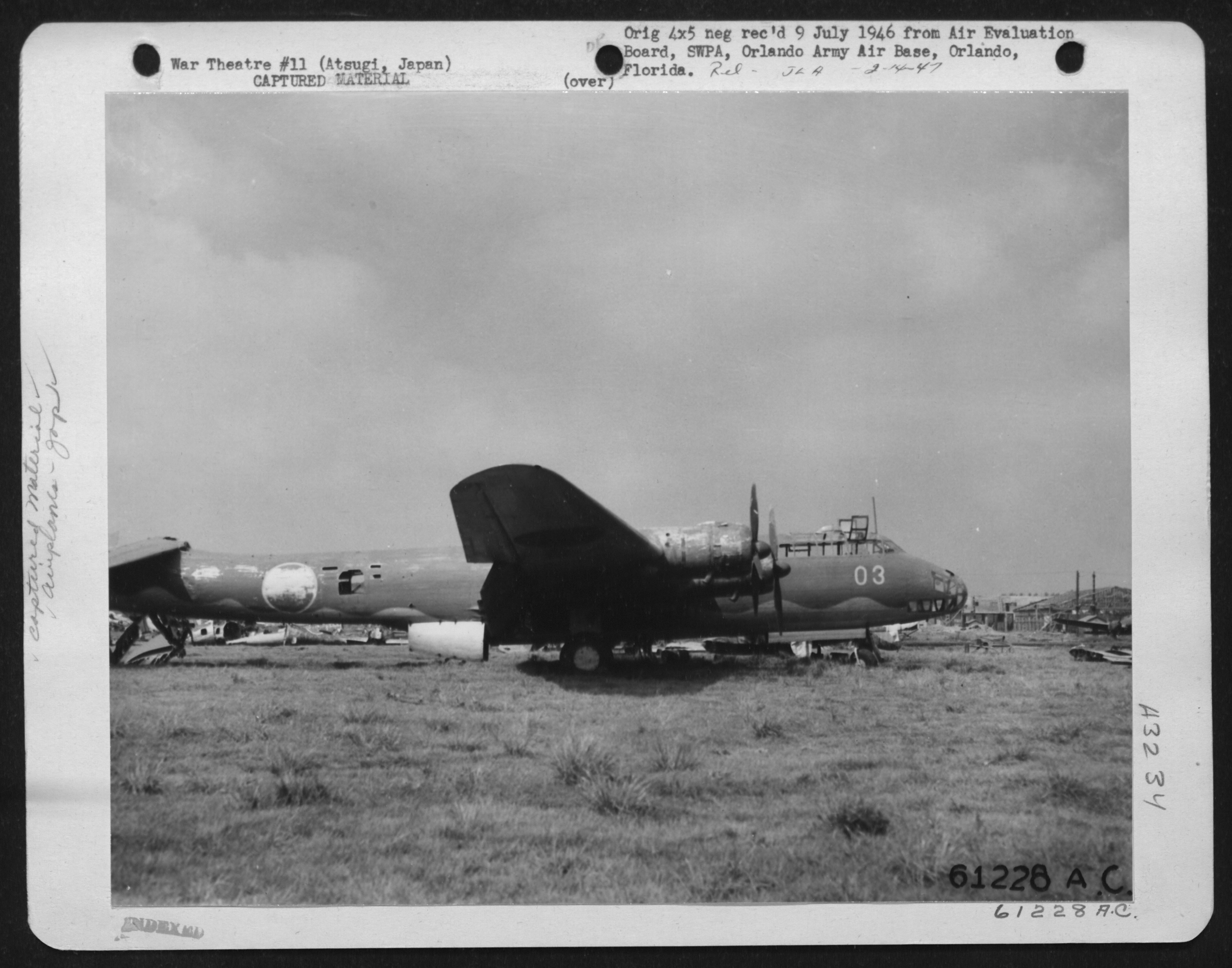
Shinzan in September, 1945

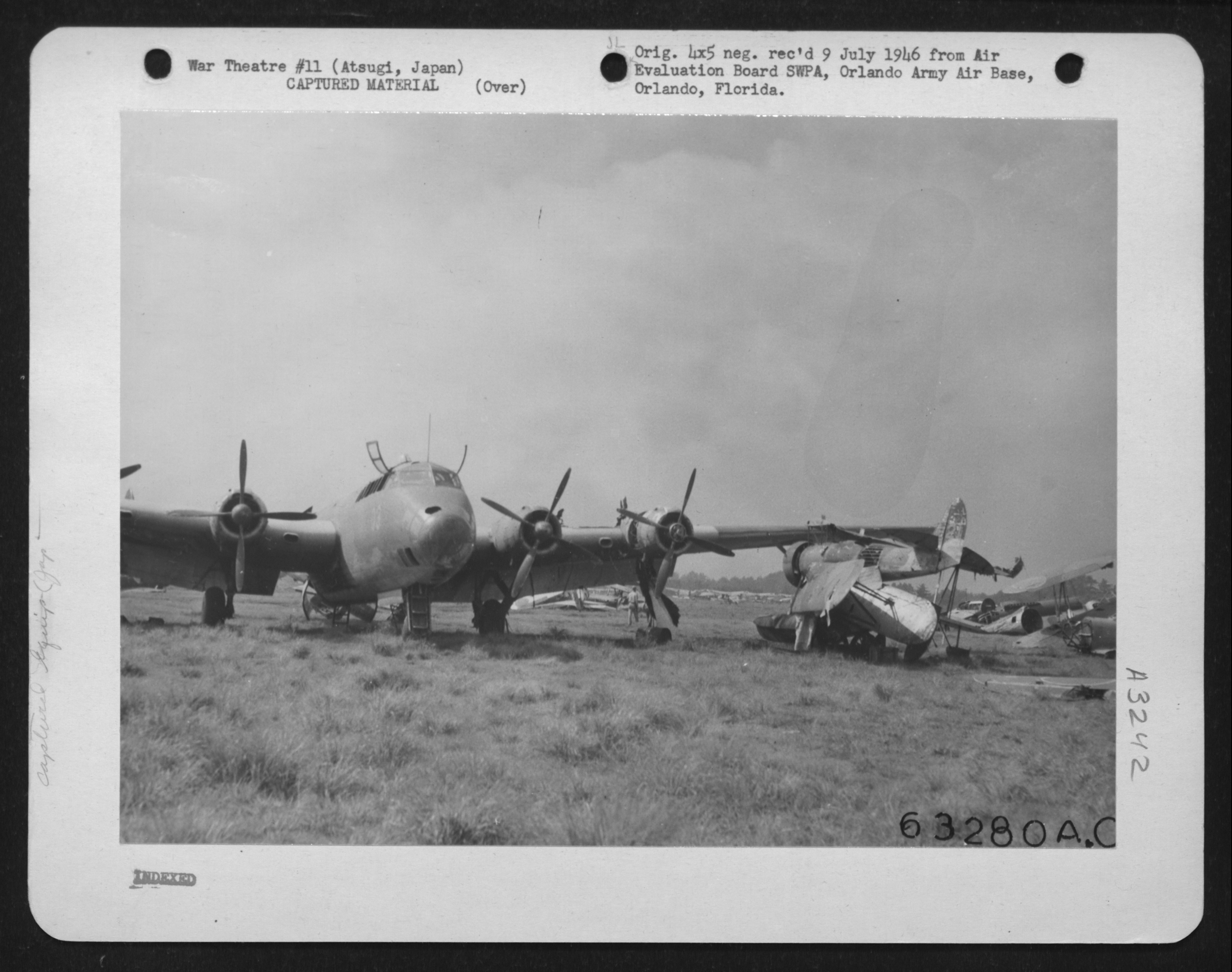
Shinzan in September, 1945

G5N1 Experimental Type 13 Land-based Attack Bomber Shinzan (13試陸上攻撃機 深山, 13-Shi Rikujō Kōgekiki Shinzan)
Prototype, two built. Initial named simply Experimental Type 13 Large-size land-based Attack Bomber (13試大型陸上攻撃機, 13-Shi Ōgata Rikujō Kōgekiki). Four-engined heavy bomber/torpedo bomber. Four-blade propeller (first prototype had three-blade propeller), mounted four Mitsubishi MK4B Kasei 12 (1,530 hp) radial engines.
G5N2 Test production Shinzan Kai (試製深山改, Shisei Shinzan Kai)
Supplementary prototype, four built. Four-blade propeller, mounted four Nakajima NK7A Mamori 11 (1,870 hp) radial engines.
G5N2-L Shinzan Kai Freighter (深山改輸送機, Sinzan Kai Yusōki)
Long-range Navy transport conversion. Both G5N1s and two G5N2s were rebuilt to G5N2-L in 1943. All aircraft were deployed to 1021st Kōkutai, Katori Air Base.
Ki-68
Proposed Army bomber prototype version of the G5N1. Engines were planned Mitsubishi Ha-101, Ha-104, Ha-107, Nakajima Ha-39 or Ha-103 engines. Discontinued in 1941.
Ki-85
Proposed Army bomber version of the G5N1. Four Mitsubishi Ha-111M engines. Full-scale mock-up was built in 1942, discontinued in May 1943.

== Operators ==
Japan

- Imperial Japanese Navy Air Service
  - 1021st Kōkutai

== Specifications (G5N1) ==
Data from Japanese Aircraft of the Pacific WarFamous airplanes of the world (1984)

General characteristics

- Crew: 7 (G5N1/2), 6 (G5N2-L)
- Capacity: 4,000 kg (8,800 lb) freight (G5N2-L)
- Length: 31.02 m (101 ft 9 in)
- Wingspan: 42.12 m (138 ft 2 in)
- Height: 8.8 m (28 ft 10 in)
- Wing area: 201.8 m^{2} (2,172 sq ft)
- Empty weight: 20,100 kg (44,313 lb)
- Gross weight: 28,150 kg (62,060 lb)
- Max takeoff weight: 32,000 kg (70,548 lb)
- Powerplant: 4 × Mitsubishi MK4B Kasei 12 14-cylinder air-cooled radial piston engines, 1,140 kW (1,530 hp) each
- Propellers: 4-bladed Sumitomo/Hamilton constant-speed propellers

Performance

- Maximum speed: 420 km/h (260 mph, 230 kn)
- Cruise speed: 278 km/h (173 mph, 150 kn)
- Range: 4,260 km (2,650 mi, 2,300 nmi)
- Service ceiling: 7,450 m (24,440 ft)

Armament

- Guns:
  - 2× 20 mm Type 99 cannons
  - 4× 7.7 mm (0.303 in) Type 92 machine guns
- Bombs:
  - 2,000-4,000 kg (4,408-8,816 lb) bombs or torpedoes
    - 2× 1,500 kg torpedoes
    - 2× 1,500 kg bombs
    - 4× 800 kg bombs
    - 12× 250 kg bombs
    - 24× 60 kg bombs

== See also ==
Related development

- Douglas DC-4E

Aircraft of comparable role, configuration, and era

- Avro Lancaster
- Boeing B-17 Flying Fortress
- Consolidated B-24 Liberator
- Handley Page Halifax
- Heinkel He 277
- Nakajima G8N
