= Mitsubishi Kasei =

1930s Japanese piston aircraft engine

Kasei
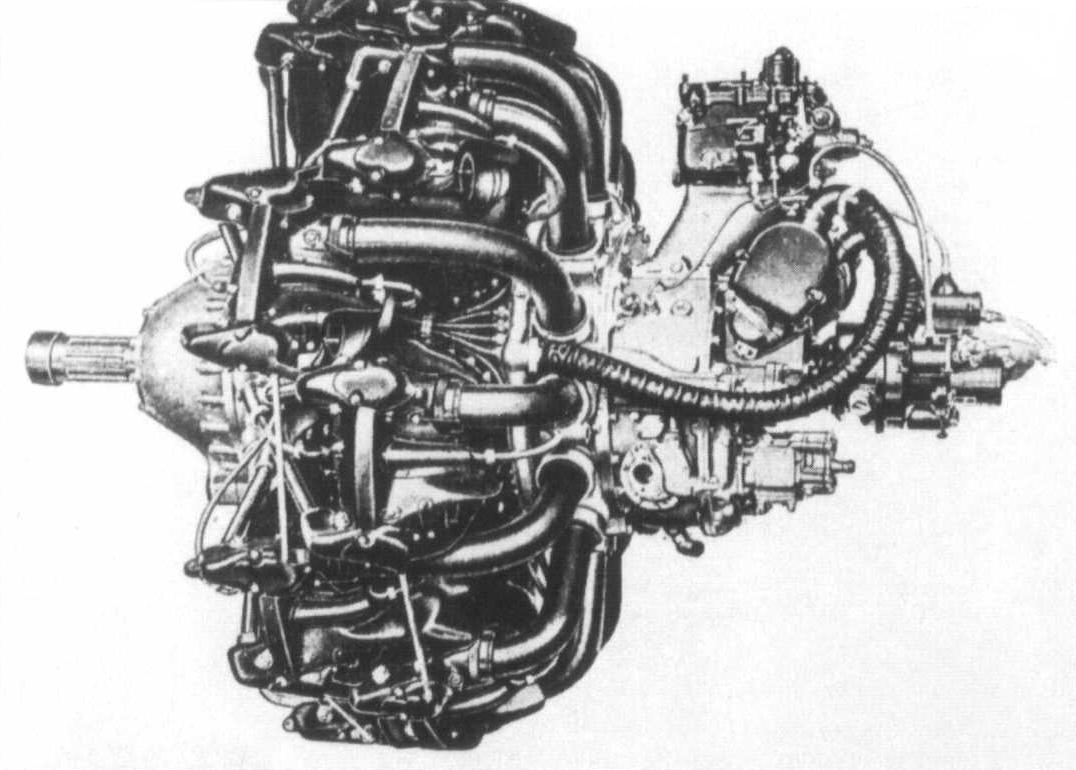
- Mitsubishi Kasei MK4B 11 used on Mitsubishi G4M Betty
- Type: Piston aircraft engine
- National origin: Japan
- Manufacturer: Mitsubishi
- First run: 1938
- Major applications: Mitsubishi G4M Betty, Mitsubishi J2M Raiden, Nakajima B6N Tenzan
- Number built: 16,486 by Mitsubishi and 11-th NAD during 1941-45
- Developed from: Mitsubishi Shinten

The Mitsubishi Kasei (火星; Mars) was a two-row, 14-cylinder air-cooled radial engine built by Mitsubishi Heavy Industries and used in a variety of World War II Japanese aircraft, such as Mitsubishi J2M and Mitsubishi G4M. The Mitsubishi model designation for this engine was A10 while it was an experimental project, in service it was known as the MK4, and known as the Ha101 & Ha111 by the Army and Kasei by the Navy. According to unified designation code it was Ha-32 of the variants from 11 to 27.

== Design and development ==
Although originally ordered by the Imperial Japanese Navy, the Kasei was based on the earlier Mitsubishi Shinten engine, itself based originally on the Mitsubishi Kinsei. Produced in a wide variety of models, the Kasei began with a rated power of 1,530 horsepower (1,140 kW), with a gradual evolution to 1,850 horsepower (1,380 kW) in later wartime versions. Three variants were developed for the Japanese Navy starting in 1939. It was also later adopted by the Imperial Japanese Army as the Ha-101 engine. Unified code was Ha-32.

Physically, the engine had a rather large 1,322 millimetres (52.0 in) diameter compared to the 1,180 millimetres (46.5 in) of the Nakajima Homare engine. Its size and weight meant it was a challenging engine to use on single engine fighters.

== Variants ==
- MK4A [Ha-32] 11

1,530 horsepower (1,140 kW), 2450 rpm at takeoff
1,410 horsepower (1,050 kW), 2350 rpm at 1,000 metres (3,300 ft)
1,380 horsepower (1,030 kW), 2350 rpm at 4,000 metres (13,000 ft)

- MK4B [Ha-32] 12 - same as MK4A 11
- MK4C [Ha-32] 13 - with extended propeller shaft

1,460 horsepower (1,090 kW), 2450 rpm at takeoff
1,420 horsepower (1,060 kW), 2350 rpm at 2,600 metres (8,500 ft)
1,300 horsepower (970 kW), 2350 rpm at 6,000 metres (20,000 ft)

- MK4D [Ha-32] 14 - with contra-rotating shafts
- MK4E [Ha-32] 15 - with improved altitude performance
- MK4P [Ha-32] 21

1,850 horsepower (1,380 kW), 2600 rpm at takeoff
1,680 horsepower (1,250 kW), 2500 rpm at 2,600 metres (8,500 ft)
1,540 horsepower (1,150 kW), 2500 rpm at 6,000 metres (20,000 ft)

- MK4Q [Ha-32] 22 - same as MK4A 21
- MK4R [Ha-32] 23 - Water-injection

1,820 horsepower (1,360 kW), 2600 rpm at takeoff
1,600 horsepower (1,200 kW), 2500 rpm at 1,300 metres (4,300 ft)
1,520 horsepower (1,130 kW), 2500 rpm at 4,100 metres (13,500 ft)

- MK4R-C [Ha-32] 23c - 1,820 horsepower (1,360 kW) - Fitted with a turbo charger that allowed an output of 1,420 horsepower (1,060 kW) to be maintained up to 30,000 feet (9,144 m) instead of only 15,750 feet (4,801 m)
- MK4S [Ha-32] 24 - Same power as the MK4P 21 with contra-rotating shafts
- MK4T [Ha-32] 25 - 1,825 horsepower (1,361 kW),1,850 horsepower (1,380 kW)
- MK4R [Ha-32] 26

1,800 horsepower (1,300 kW), 2600 rpm at takeoff
1,510 horsepower (1,130 kW), 2500 rpm at 2,800 metres (9,200 ft)
1,400 horsepower (1,000 kW), 2500 rpm at 7,200 metres (23,600 ft)

- MK4U-4 [Ha-32] 26a - Mechanically driven 2-speed supercharger

1,760 horsepower (1,310 kW), 2600 rpm at takeoff
1,590 horsepower (1,190 kW), 2500 rpm rated at 2500m
1,400 horsepower (1,000 kW), 2500 rpm rated at 6800m

- MK4V [Ha-32] 27

1,795 horsepower (1,339 kW)

== Applications ==
- Kawanishi E15K
- Kawanishi H8K
- Kawanishi N1K
- Mitsubishi G4M
- Mitsubishi J2M
- Mitsubishi Ki-21
- Nakajima B6N
- Nakajima G5N
- Yokosuka P1Y

== Specifications (MK4V 27) ==
Data from

=== General characteristics ===
- Type: 14-cylinder, two-row, radial piston engine
- Bore: 150 mm (5.9 in),
- Stroke: 170 mm (6.7 in)
- Displacement: 42 L (2,567 cu in)
- Diameter: 1,340 mm (53 in)
- Dry weight: 780 kg (1,720 lb)

=== Components ===
- Valvetrain: Pushrod operated overhead-valve system with 2 valves per cylinder
- Supercharger: Centrifugal, two-speed single stage
- Cooling system: Air-cooled
- Reduction gear: Double planetary spur reduction gear, Ratio: 0.538:1

=== Performance ===
- Power output:
- 1,850 horsepower (1,380 kW) at Takeoff
- 1,680 horsepower (1,250 kW) at 6,889 feet (2,100 m) Low blower rated with water injection)
- 1,570 horsepower (1,170 kW) at 18,044 feet (5,500 m), Rated high blower with water injection)
- Specific power: 0.72 hp/in³ (32.9 Kw/L)
- Compression ratio: 6.5:1
- Power-to-weight ratio: 1.08 hp/lb (1.77 kW/kg)

== See also ==
Comparable engines

- BMW 801
- Nakajima Mamoru
- Pratt & Whitney R-1830 Twin Wasp
- Shvetsov ASh-82
- Wright R-2600 Twin Cyclone

Related lists

- List of aircraft engines
