= Japanese submarine Ha-111 =

Ha-101-class submarine in Imperial Japanese Navy

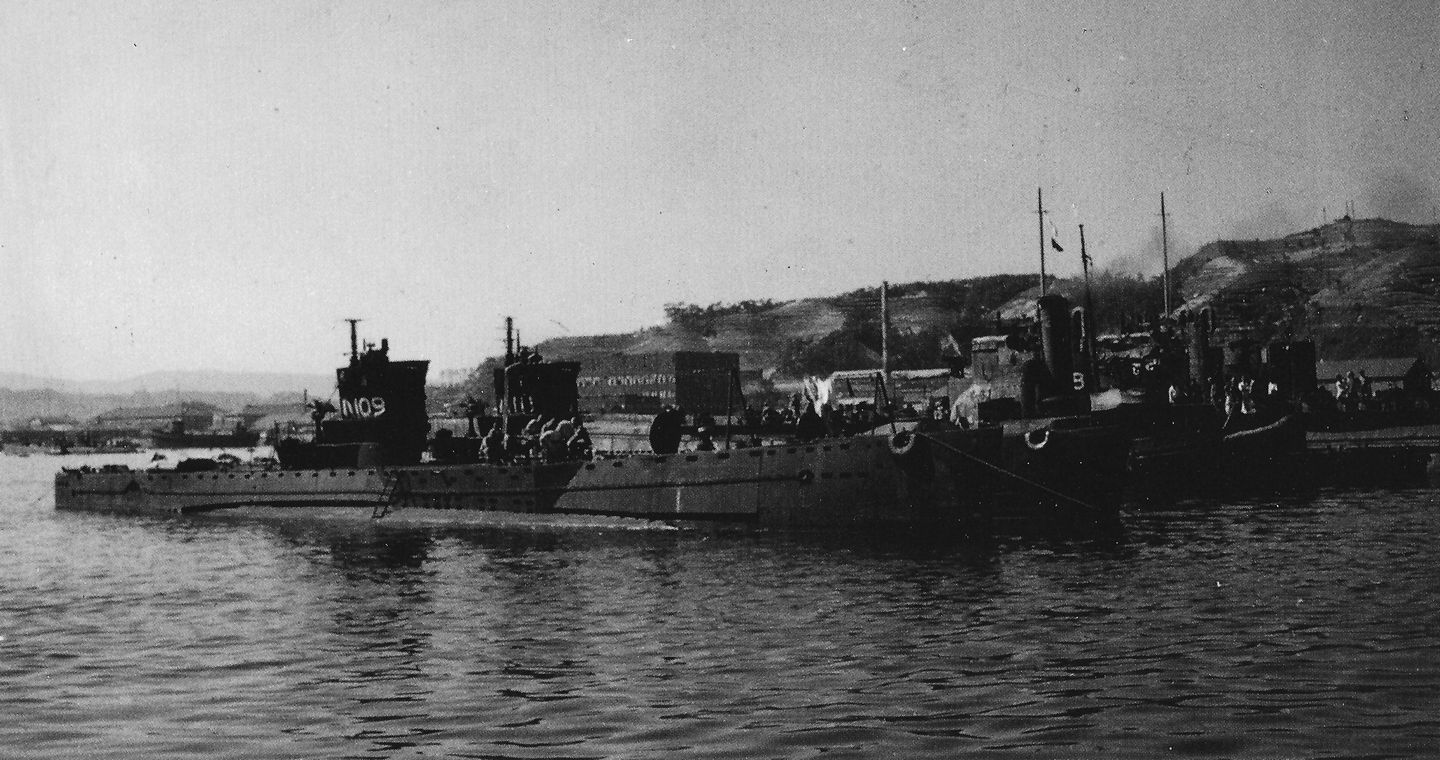
- Ha-109 (left) and Ha-111 (right) at Kure, Japan, on 16 October 1945.

History

Japan
- Name: Small Supply Submarine No. 4611
- Builder: Mitsubishi, Kobe, Japan
- Laid down: 6 November 1944
- Renamed: Ha-111
- Launched: 1945
- Completed: 13 July 1945
- Commissioned: 13 July 1945
- Fate: Surrendered 2 September 1945; Stricken 30 November 1945; Scuttled 1 April 1946

General characteristics
- Type: Transport submarine
- Displacement: 436 t (429 long tons) surfaced; 501 t (493 long tons) submerged
- Length: 44.5 m (146 ft 0 in)
- Beam: 6.1 m (20 ft 0 in)
- Draft: 4.04 m (13 ft 3 in)
- Installed power: 400 bhp (300 kW) (diesels); 150 hp (110 kW) (electric motor)
- Propulsion: Diesel-electric; 1 × diesel engines; 1 × electric motor
- Speed: 10 knots (19 km/h; 12 mph) surfaced; 5 knots (9.3 km/h; 5.8 mph) submerged
- Range: 3,000 nmi (5,600 km; 3,500 mi) at 10 knots (19 km/h; 12 mph) surfaced; 46 nmi (85 km; 53 mi) at 2.3 knots (4.3 km/h; 2.6 mph) submerged
- Test depth: 100 meters (328 ft)
- Capacity: 60 metric tons (59 long tons) cargo (as designed); 10 x 450-millimeter (17.7 in) torpedoes (as completed)
- Complement: 22
- Armament: 1 × single 25 mm (1 in) Type 96 anti-aircraft gun

Ha-111 was an Imperial Japanese Navy Ha-101-class submarine. Converted during construction into a submarine tender for midget submarines, she was completed and commissioned in July 1945, only a few weeks before the end of World War II, the last Ha-101-class submarine to be completed. She surrendered at the end of the war in September 1945, and was scuttled in April 1946.

== Design and description ==
The Ha-101-class submarines were designed as small, cheap transport submarines to resupply isolated island garrisons. They displaced 436 metric tons (429 long tons) surfaced and 501 metric tons (493 long tons) submerged. The submarines were 44.5 meters (146 ft 0 in) long, had a beam of 6.1 meters (20 ft 0 in) and a draft of 4.04 meters (13 ft 3 in). They were designed to carry 60 metric tons (59 long tons) of cargo.

For surface running, the boats were powered by a single 400-brake-horsepower (298 kW) diesel engine that drove one propeller shaft. When submerged the propeller was driven by a 140-horsepower (104 kW) electric motor. They could reach 10 knots (19 km/h; 12 mph) on the surface and 5 knots (9.3 km/h; 5.8 mph) underwater. On the surface, the Ha-101s had a range of 3,000 nautical miles (5,600 km; 3,500 mi) at 10 knots (19 km/h; 12 mph); submerged, they had a range of 46 nmi (85 km; 53 mi) at 2.3 knots (4.3 km/h; 2.6 mph). The boats were armed a single mount for a 25 mm (1 in) Type 96 anti-aircraft gun.

== Construction and commissioning ==
Ha-111 was laid down on 6 November 1944 by Mitsubishi at Kobe, Japan, as Small Supply Submarine No. 4611. Renamed Ha-111, she was launched in 1945. During construction, she underwent conversion to a submarine tender for midget submarines, the conversion involving modifying her cargo hold to accommodate ten 450-millimeter (17.7 in) torpedoes for midget submarines. She was completed and commissioned on 13 July 1945.

== Service history ==
Upon commissioning, Ha-111 was assigned to the 10th Special Attack Unit. Hostilities between Japan and the Allies ended on 15 August 1945. and she surrendered to the Allies at Saeki on 2 September 1945.

On 2 November 1945, Ha-109 was reassigned to Japanese Submarine Division Two under United States Navy command along with her sister ships Ha-103, Ha-105, Ha-106, Ha-107, Ha-108, and Ha-109. In November 1945, the U.S. Navy ordered Ha-111 to move to Sasebo, Japan.

== Disposal ==
The Japanese struck Ha-111 from the Navy list on 30 November 1945. She was among a number of Japanese submarines the U.S. Navy scuttled off the Goto Islands near Sasebo in Operation Road's End on 1 April 1946, sinking just beyond the 100-fathom (600 ft; 183 m) line at 32°37′N 129°17′E.
