= Japanese submarine Ha-103 =

Imperial Japanese Navy Submarine

History

Japan
- Name: Small Supply Submarine No. 4603
- Builder: Mitsubishi, Kobe, Japan
- Laid down: 29 June 1944
- Launched: 21 October 1944
- Renamed: Ha-103 on 21 October 1944
- Completed: 3 February 1945
- Commissioned: 3 February 1945
- Fate: Surrendered 2 September 1945; Stricken 30 November 1945; Scuttled 1 April 1946

General characteristics
- Type: Transport submarine
- Displacement: 436 t (429 long tons) surfaced; 501 t (493 long tons) submerged
- Length: 44.5 m (146 ft 0 in)
- Beam: 6.1 m (20 ft 0 in)
- Draft: 4.04 m (13 ft 3 in)
- Installed power: 400 bhp (300 kW) (diesels); 150 hp (110 kW) (electric motor)
- Propulsion: Diesel-electric; 1 × diesel engines; 1 × electric motor
- Speed: 10 knots (19 km/h; 12 mph) surfaced; 5 knots (9.3 km/h; 5.8 mph) submerged
- Range: 3,000 nmi (5,600 km; 3,500 mi) at 10 knots (19 km/h; 12 mph) surfaced; 46 nmi (85 km; 53 mi) at 2.3 knots (4.3 km/h; 2.6 mph) submerged
- Test depth: 100 meters (328 ft)
- Capacity: 60 metric tons (59 long tons)
- Complement: 22
- Armament: 1 × single 25 mm (1 in) Type 96 anti-aircraft gun

Ha-103 was an Imperial Japanese Navy Ha-101-class submarine. Completed and commissioned in February 1945, she served during the final months of World War II, conducting a supply run and operating on radar picket duty. She surrendered at the end of the war in September 1945 and was scuttled in April 1946.

== Design and description ==
The Ha-101-class submarines were designed as small, inexpensive transport submarines to resupply isolated island garrisons. They displaced 436 metric tons (429 long tons) surfaced and 501 metric tons (493 long tons) submerged. The submarines were 44.5 meters (146 ft 0 in) long, had a beam of 6.1 meters (20 ft 0 in) and a draft of 4.04 meters (13 ft 3 in). They were designed to carry 60 metric tons (59 long tons) of cargo.

For surface running, the boats were powered by a single 400-brake-horsepower (298 kW) diesel engine that drove one propeller shaft. When submerged, the propeller was driven by a 140-horsepower (104 kW) electric motor. They could reach 10 knots (19 km/h; 12 mph) on the surface and 5 knots (9.3 km/h; 5.8 mph) underwater. On the surface, the Ha-101s had a range of 3,000 nautical miles (5,600 km; 3,500 mi) at 10 knots (19 km/h; 12 mph); submerged, they had a range of 46 nmi (85 km; 53 mi) at 2.3 knots (4.3 km/h; 2.6 mph). The boats were armed with a single mount for a 25 mm (1 in) Type 96 anti-aircraft gun.

== Construction and commissioning ==
Ha-103 was laid down on 29 June 1944 by Mitsubishi at Kobe, Japan, as Small Supply Submarine No. 4603. She was launched on 21 October 1944 and was named Ha-103 that day. She was completed and commissioned on 3 February 1945.

== Service history ==
Upon commissioning, Ha-103 was assigned to Submarine Squadron 11 for workups. On 15 April 1945, she was reassigned to Submarine Division 16 for supply operations. She got underway from Kure, Japan, on 16 April 1945 for her first supply run, bound for Minamidaitōjima in the Daitō Islands southeast of Okinawa. After arriving there, she unloaded her cargo, embarked stranded Imperial Japanese Navy Air Service pilots for transportation to Japan, and quickly departed for her return voyage, reaching Kure on 22 April 1945.

On 29 April 1945, Ha-103 was reassigned to Submarine Unit No. 1, and she departed Kure that day to operate 300 nautical miles (560 km; 350 mi) south of Honshu on radar picket duty. She returned to Kure on 20 May 1945.

Hostilities between Japan and the Allies ended on 15 August 1945, and on 2 September 1945, Ha-103 surrendered to the Allies at Kure. On 2 November 1945, she was reassigned to Japanese Submarine Division Two under United States Navy command along with her sister ships Ha-105, Ha-106, Ha-107, Ha-108, Ha-109, and Ha-111. In November 1945, the U.S. Navy ordered all Japanese submarines at Kure, including Ha-103, to move to Sasebo, Japan.

== Disposal ==
The Japanese struck Ha-103 from the Navy list on 30 November 1945. She was among a number of Japanese submarines the U.S. Navy scuttled off the Goto Islands in Operation Road's End on 1 April 1946, sinking at 32°30′N 128°40′E.
