= Douglas DC-4E =

US airliner prototype with 4 piston engines, 1938

DC-4E
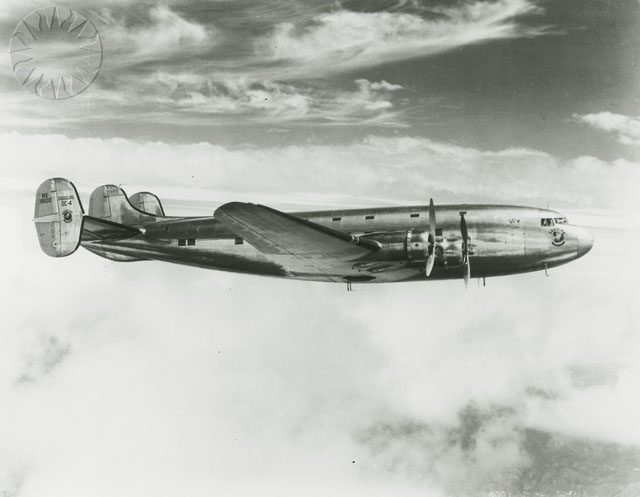
- The Douglas DC-4E in flight

General information
- Type: Experimental airliner
- Manufacturer: Douglas Aircraft Company
- Primary users: United Airlines Imperial Japanese Airways
- Number built: 1

History
- First flight: June 7, 1938
- Developed into: Nakajima G5N

The Douglas DC-4E was an American experimental airliner that was developed before World War II. The DC-4E never entered production due to being superseded by an entirely new design, the Douglas DC-4/C-54, which proved very successful.

Many of the aircraft's innovative design features found their way into the Nakajima G5N bomber after the single DC-4E prototype was sold to a Japanese airline and clandestinely dismantled for study by Nakajima at the behest of the Imperial Japanese Navy.

== Design and development ==
The design originated in 1935 from a requirement by United Air Lines. The goal was to develop a much larger and more sophisticated replacement for the DC-3 before the first DC-3 had even flown.

Such was the initial interest from other airlines, that American Airlines, Eastern Air Lines, Pan American Airways and Transcontinental and Western Air (TWA) (Note: Transcontinental and Western Air renamed itself to Trans World Airlines after World War II.) joined United, providing $100,000 each toward the cost of developing the new aircraft. As cost and complexity rose, Pan American and TWA withdrew their funds in favor of the Boeing 307 Stratoliner, which was anticipated to be less costly.

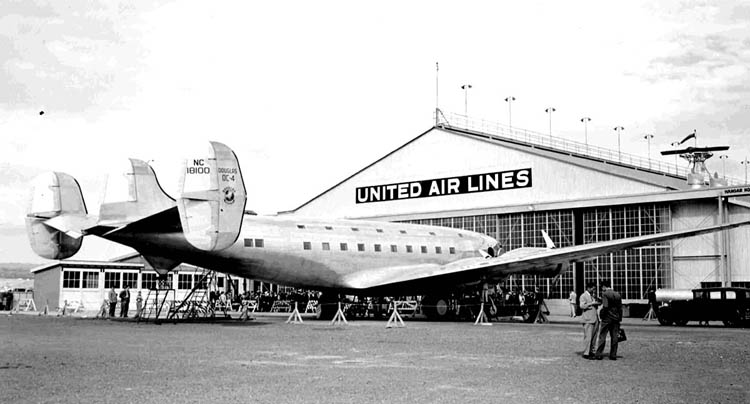
The giant new DC-4E at the United Air Lines base at Oakland Airport

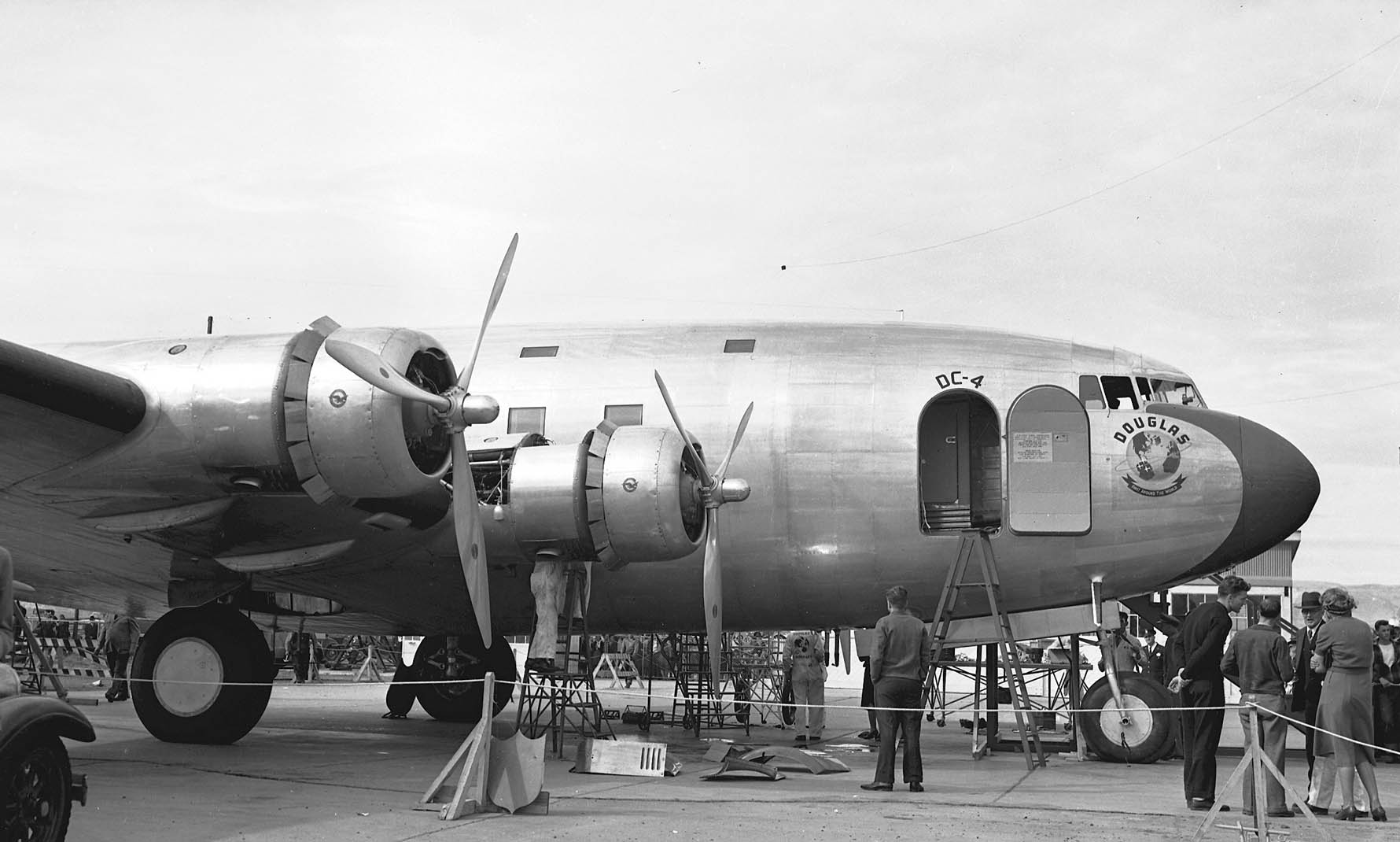
Close up of the nose

With a planned day capacity of 42 passengers (13 rows of two or more seats and a central aisle) or 30 as a sleeper transport (like the DST), the DC-4 (as it was then known) would seat twice as many people as the DC-3 and would be the first large aircraft with a nosewheel. Other innovations included auxiliary power units, power-boosted flight controls, alternating current electrical system and air conditioning. Cabin pressurization was also planned for production aircraft. The novel tail with three low vertical stabilizers enabled use of existing hangars and provided sufficient vertical fin area to allow the aircraft to take off with only two engines on one side operating. The wing planform was similar to the DC-3, with a swept leading edge and almost straight trailing edge. The four 1,450 hp (1,080 kW) Pratt & Whitney R-2180-A Twin Hornet 14-cylinder radials were all mounted with noticeable toe-out, particularly the outer pair.

== Operational history ==
The prototype (NX18100, s/n 1601) first flew, without incident, on June 7, 1938 from Clover Field in Santa Monica, California, piloted by Carl Cover. Testing issues, however, delayed the Approved Type Certificate until May 5, 1939. It was used by United Air Lines for in-service evaluation during 1939. On June 9, 1939, when the DC-4 was in Dayton, Ohio, along with Carl Cover, Orville Wright was a passenger on a flight over the city. Although the aircraft was relatively trouble-free, the complex systems proved to be expensive to maintain and performance was below expectations, especially with an increase in seating to 52 and gross weight to 65,000 lb (29,484 kg).

The design was abandoned in favor of a marginally smaller, less-complex four-engined design, with a single vertical fin and 21 ft (6.4 m) shorter wingspan. This newer design was also designated DC-4, leading the earlier design to be redesignated DC-4E (E for "experimental"). In late 1939, the DC-4E was sold to Imperial Japanese Airways, which was buying American aircraft for evaluation and technology transfer during this period. At the behest of the Imperial Japanese Navy, the DC-4E was transferred to the Nakajima Aircraft Company and reverse-engineered, becoming the basis for the unsuccessful G5N bomber. To conceal its fate, the Japanese press reported shortly after its purchase that the DC-4E had crashed in Tokyo Bay.

== Operators ==
Japan

- Imperial Japanese Airways

United States

- United Airlines

== Specifications (Douglas DC-4E) ==
Data from McDonnell Douglas Aircraft since 1920, Vol. 1

General characteristics

- Crew: 3 (pilot, co-pilot, flight engineer)
- Capacity: 42 passengers
- Length: 97 ft 7 in (29.74 m)
- Wingspan: 138 ft 3 in (42.14 m)
- Height: 24 ft 6 in (7.48 m)
- Wing area: 2,155.01 sq ft (200.207 m^{2})
- Empty weight: 42,564 lb (19,307 kg)
- Gross weight: 61,500 lb (27,896 kg)
- Max takeoff weight: 66,500 lb (30,164 kg)
- Powerplant: 4 × Pratt & Whitney R-2180-S1A1-G Twin Hornet 14-cyl. two-row air-cooled radial piston engines, 1,450 hp (1,080 kW) each
- Propellers: 3-bladed metal variable-pitch propellers

Performance

- Maximum speed: 245 mph (394 km/h, 213 kn) at 7,000 ft (2,100 m)
- Cruise speed: 200 mph (322 km/h, 174 kn)
- Range: 2,200 mi (3,500 km, 1,900 nmi)
- Service ceiling: 22,900 ft (7,000 m)
- Rate of climb: 1,175 ft/min (5.97 m/s)
- Wing loading: 28.5 lb/sq ft (139 kg/m^{2})
- Power/mass: 0.0943 hp/lb (4.8kW/kg)

== See also ==
Related development

- Douglas DC-4
- Nakajima G5N

Aircraft of comparable role, configuration, and era

- Boeing 307 Stratoliner

Related lists

- List of civil aircraft
