= Japanese cruiser Ibuki (1943) =

Aircraft carrier of the Imperial Japanese Navy

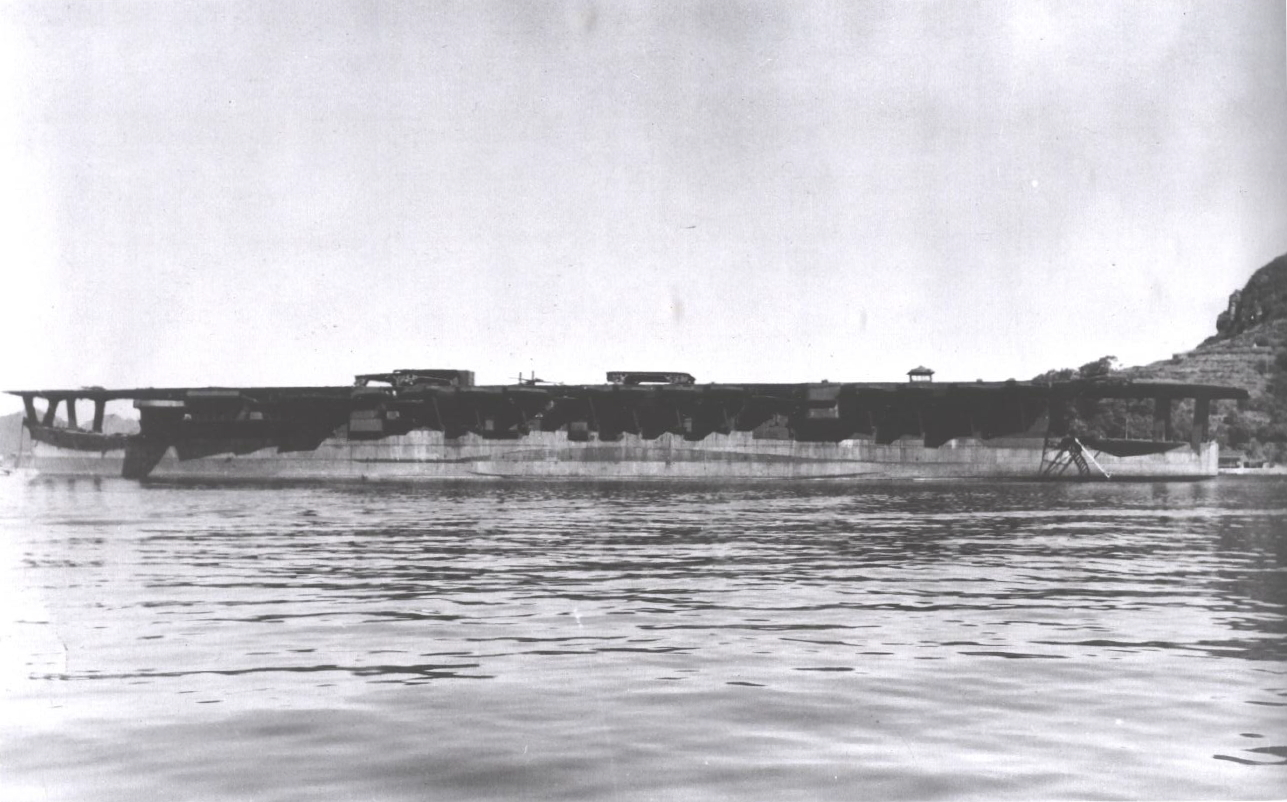
- Ibuki at anchor in Sasebo, September 1945

History

Empire of Japan
- Name: Ibuki
- Namesake: Mount Ibuki
- Ordered: November 1941
- Builder: Kure Naval Arsenal, Kure
- Laid down: 24 April 1942
- Launched: 21 May 1943
- Fate: Scrapped, 22 November 1946

General characteristics (1944)
- Type: Light aircraft carrier
- Displacement: 14,800 t (14,600 long tons)
- Length: 200.6 m (658 ft 2 in)
- Beam: 21.2 m (69 ft 7 in)
- Draft: 6.31 m (20 ft 8 in)
- Installed power: 4 × three-drum boilers; 72,000 shp (54,000 kW)
- Propulsion: 2 × shafts; 2 × geared steam turbine sets
- Speed: 29 knots (54 km/h; 33 mph)
- Range: 7,500 nmi (13,900 km; 8,600 mi) at 18 knots (33 km/h; 21 mph)
- Complement: 1,015
- Sensors & processing systems: 1 × Type 2, Mark 2, Model 1 early-warning radar
- Armament: 2 × twin 8 cm (3 in) dual-purpose guns; 16 × triple 2.5 cm (1 in) AA guns; 4 × 28-tube 12 cm (4.7 in) rocket launchers
- Armor: Waterline belt: 100–140 mm (3.9–5.5 in); Deck: 35–60 mm (1.4–2.4 in); Bulkheads: 95–140 mm (3.7–5.5 in)
- Aircraft carried: 27 aircraft

The Japanese cruiser Ibuki (伊吹) was a heavy cruiser built for the Imperial Japanese Navy (IJN) during World War II. The lead ship of her class of two ships, she was ordered to be converted into a light aircraft carrier in 1943 before completion to help replace the aircraft carriers sunk during the Battle of Midway in mid-1942. The conversion was delayed and finally stopped in March 1945 in order to concentrate on building small submarines. Ibuki was scrapped in the Sasebo Naval Arsenal beginning in 1946.

== Background ==
The Ibuki-class cruisers were ordered in the Rapid Naval Armaments Supplement Programme of November 1941, and they were slightly improved versions of the preceding Mogami class after those ships had been upgraded during the late 1930s. After the heavy losses suffered in the Battle of Midway in early June 1942, the IJN reorganized its current building programs to emphasize aircraft carrier construction. Ibuki, which had only been laid down a few months earlier, had all work suspended while the IJN decided what to do with her. The navy ordered the shipyard to resume and accelerate construction the following month in order to launch her hull as soon as possible to free her slipway for new carriers. After she was launched in May 1943, construction was suspended again in July while the IJN decided what to do with her. The navy considered completing Ibuki as a high-speed replenishment oiler, but decided to convert her into a light aircraft carrier on 25 August.

== Description as a cruiser ==
As originally designed the Ibukis had a length of 200.6 meters (658 ft 2 in) overall, a beam of 20.2 meters (66 ft 3 in) and a draft of 6.04 meters (19 ft 10 in). They displaced 12,220 metric tons (12,030 long tons) at standard load and 14,828 metric tons (14,594 long tons) at (full load).

The Ibuki class was fitted with four Kampon geared steam turbine sets, each driving one propeller shaft using steam provided by eight Kampon Ro Gō-type three-drum boilers. The turbines were intended to produce a total of 152,000 shaft horsepower (113,000 kW) to give the ships a speed of 35 knots (65 km/h; 40 mph). They carried enough fuel oil to give them an estimated range of 6,300 nautical miles (11,700 km; 7,200 mi) at 18 knots (33 km/h; 21 mph).

=== Armament and sensors ===
The main battery of the Ibuki class was intended to be ten 50-caliber 20 cm (8 in) 3rd Year Type No. 2 guns mounted in twin turrets, three forward and two aft of the superstructure. The first two forward turrets were on the same level, but the third turret could superfire over the first two. The secondary armament was to consist of eight 40-caliber 12.7 cm (5 in) Type 89 anti-aircraft (AA) guns in twin mounts. The ships were also intended to be equipped with four twin 2.5 cm (1 in) Type 96 light AA guns abreast the funnel. Two twin 13.2 mm (0.52 in) Type 93 machine gun mounts were supposed to be mounted on the bridge with 2,000 rounds per gun.

The Ibuki-class ships were intended to be armed with four rotating quadruple 61 cm (24 in) Type 92 torpedo tube mounts, two on each broadside. The ship carried 24 Type 93 torpedoes, commonly referred to in post-war literature as the "Long Lance", 16 in the tubes and eight in reserve. Quick-reloading gear was installed for every mount that allowed the reserve torpedoes to be loaded in three to five minutes in ideal conditions.

Early warning would have been provided by a Type 2, Mark 2, Model 1 radar mounted at the top of the foremast. A Type 93 passive hydrophone system was intended be fitted in the bow. The cruisers were designed to carry three aircraft on a platform between the funnel and the mainmast. These would have consisted of a single three-seat Aichi E13A and a pair of two-seat Yokosuka E14Y floatplanes. They would have been launched by a pair of aircraft catapults, one on each side of the aircraft platform.

=== Armor ===
The ship's waterline armored belt was 100 millimeters (3.9 in) thick over the propulsion machinery spaces and 140 millimeters (5.5 in) thick on the sides of the magazines. The outer ends of the fore and aft machinery compartments was protected by a 105-millimeter (4.1 in) transverse bulkhead. The magazines were protected by fore and aft transverse bulkheads 95–140 millimeters (3.7–5.5 in) thick. The thickness of the armored deck ranged from 35–60 millimeters (1.4–2.4 in) and the sides of the conning tower were 100 millimeters thick. The main gun turrets were protected by 25 millimeters of armor and the barbette armor ranged from 25 to 100 millimeters in thickness.

== Conversion ==
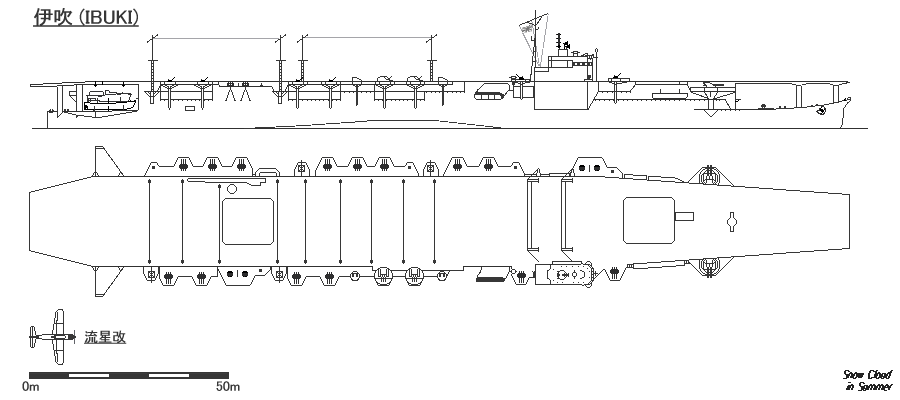
Right elevation and plan of Ibuki as a carrier

Ibuki's two aft turbine sets, the four aft boilers and the two innermost propeller shafts were removed with their propellers; the exhaust uptakes for the remaining boilers were trunked together into a downward-curving funnel on the starboard side of the hull. These changes left her with two turbines and four boilers producing 72,000 shp (54,000 kW). The reduced power meant that Ibuki's top speed was only 29 knots (54 km/h; 33 mph). The space made available was used for aviation gasoline tanks, additional fuel oil tanks, as well as bomb and torpedo magazines. The ship now could carry enough oil for an estimated range of 7,500 nmi (13,900 km; 8,600 mi) at a speed of 18 knots (33 km/h; 21 mph).

As part of the conversion, the existing superstructure was razed, a new hangar deck was built above the existing upper deck and a full-length 205-meter (672 ft 7 in) flight deck was added. It had a maximum width of 23 meters (75 ft 6 in), two 13-by-11.6-meter (42.7 by 38.1 ft) aircraft elevators that serviced the single hangar and a small starboard island structure. The ship was bulged to improve her stability, which increased her beam to a maximum of 21.2 meters (69 ft 7 in). Ibuki's trials displacement increased to 14,800 metric tons (14,600 long tons) and the additional weight increased her draft to 6.31 meters (20 ft 8 in).

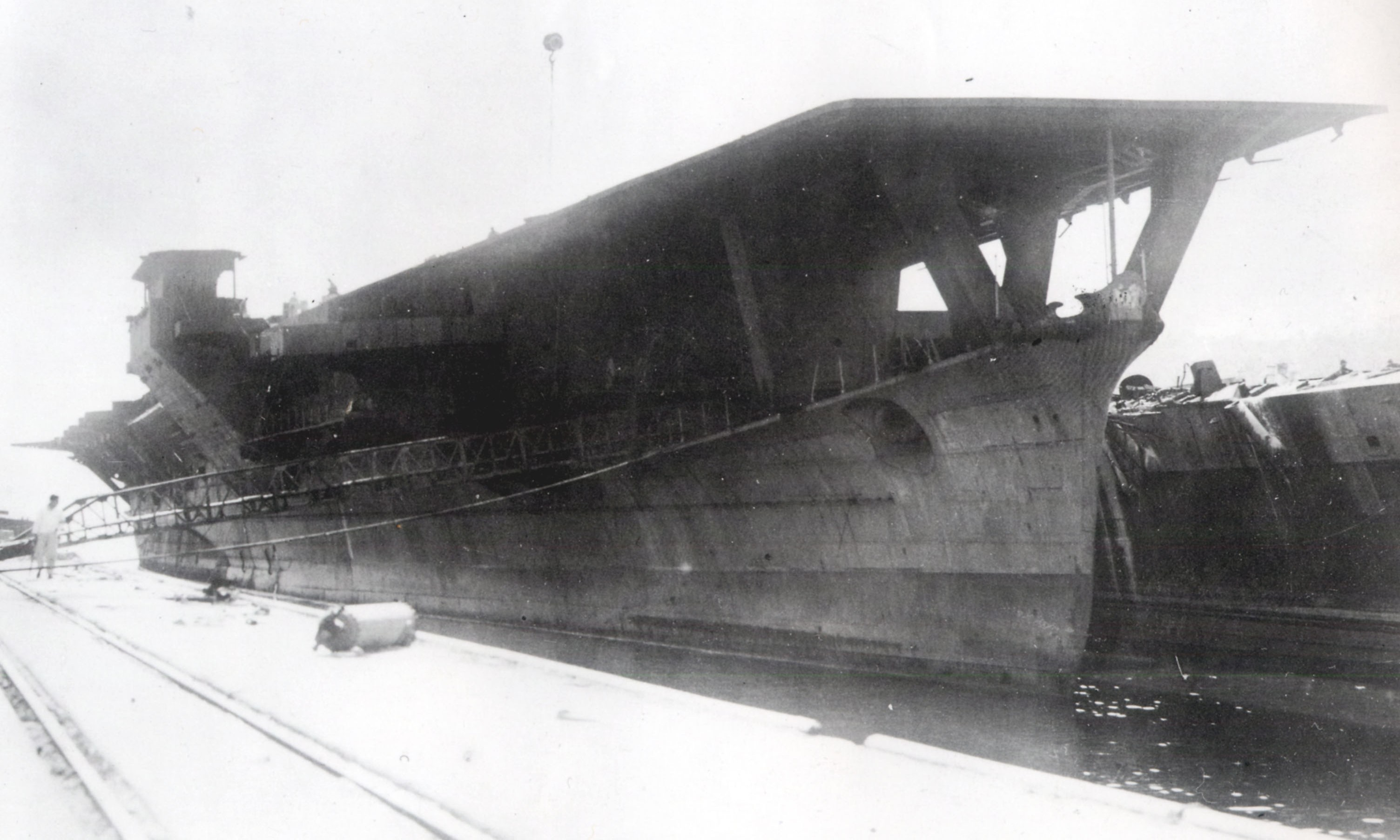
Ibuki in Sasebo, just before being scrapped, 22 October 1946

Initially, the ship was to have a very light armament of only 22 triple 2.5-centimeter gun mounts, controlled by eight Type 95 fire-control directors, but this was modified in 1944 to substitute four 60-caliber 8 cm (3 in) Type 98 dual-purpose guns, mounted in two twin-gun turrets, and four 28-tube launchers for 12-centimeter (4.7 in) anti-aircraft rockets for six of the triple 25-millimeter gun mounts and two directors (now Type 4s). This gave the ship a total of forty-eight 25 mm guns in 16 triple mounts.

At the top of the island, Ibuki was planned to have a 2-meter (6 ft 7 in) rangefinder and a Type 21 radar. In 1944, the radar was moved to a retractable mount in the flight deck near the bow and a Type 22 surface search and a Type 13 early-warning radar were going to be installed on the island. The ship retained the Type 93 hydrophone system.

The ship's air group was intended to consist of 27 aircraft, 15 Mitsubishi A7M Reppū (Allied codename: "Sam") fighters and a dozen Aichi B7A Ryusei ("Grace") dive/torpedo bombers. They would be operated by the ship's complement of 1,015 officers and men.

== Construction ==
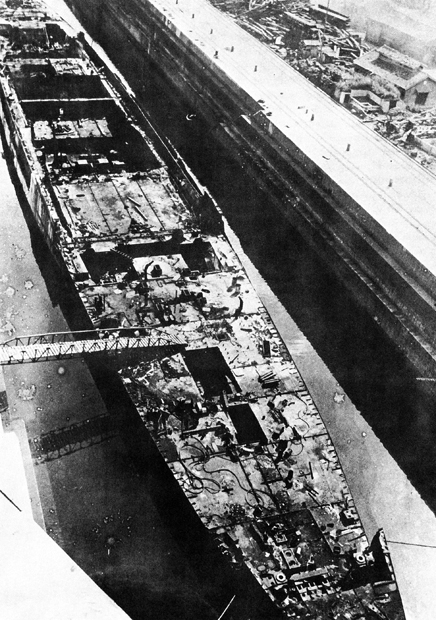
Ibuki being scrapped, 14 March 1947

Ibuki was laid down at the Kure Naval Arsenal, Kure, on 24 April 1942; however, her construction was suspended on 30 June. Construction resumed on 30 July to allow the ship to be launched as soon as possible. She was named after Mount Ibuki on 5 April 1943 as per the IJN's naming convention for first-class cruisers. The ship was launched on 21 May and construction was suspended in July until the IJN decided to convert her into a light aircraft carrier the following month. While plans were prepared for the conversion, she was towed to the Sasebo Naval Arsenal, Sasebo, by the submarine tender Jingei on 19–21 December.

Completion of the ship was originally scheduled for March 1945, but it was rescheduled for August because of delays. Work continued until 16 March 1945, but it was halted when she was 80% complete to concentrate on the construction of small submarines needed to defend Japan against an American invasion. She was anchored in Ebisu Bay, near Sasebo, and surrendered there on 2 September along with the rest of the Japanese military. Ibuki was scrapped in Sasebo Naval Arsenal Drydock No. 7 from 22 November 1946 to 1 August 1947.
