= Arpeggio of Blue Steel =

Japanese manga series and its adaptations

- First tankōbon volume cover, featuring Iona and the I-401

蒼き鋼のアルペジオ (Aoki Hagane no Arupejio)
- Genre: Military science fiction
- Manga
- Written by: Ark Performance
- Published by: Shōnen Gahōsha
- English publisher: NA: Seven Seas Entertainment
- Magazine: Young King OURs
- Original run: September 30, 2009 – present
- Volumes: 31
- Anime television series

Arpeggio of Blue Steel -Ars Nova-
- Directed by: Seiji Kishi
- Written by: Makoto Uezu
- Music by: Masato Kōda
- Studio: Sanzigen
- Licensed by: NA: Discotek Media
- Original network: MBS, Tokyo MX, BS NTV, AT-X
- English network: SEA: Animax Asia
- Original run: October 7, 2013 – December 23, 2013
- Episodes: 12
- Anime film

Arpeggio of Blue Steel -Ars Nova DC-
- Directed by: Seiji Kishi
- Written by: Makoto Uezu
- Music by: Masato Kōda
- Studio: Sanzigen
- Released: January 31, 2015
- Runtime: 105 minutes
- Anime film

Arpeggio of Blue Steel -Ars Nova Cadenza-
- Directed by: Seiji Kishi
- Written by: Makoto Uezu
- Music by: Masato Kōda
- Studio: Sanzigen
- Released: October 3, 2015
- Runtime: 105 minutes
- Manga

Salty Road
- Written by: Ark Performance
- Illustrated by: TALI
- Published by: Shōnen Gahōsha
- Magazine: Young King OURs
- Original run: October 16, 2014 – March 16, 2016
- Volumes: 3
- icon

Arpeggio of Blue Steel (蒼き鋼のアルペジオ, Aoki Hagane no Arpeggio) is a Japanese manga series produced by Ark Performance and serialized in Shōnen Gahosha's Young King OURs. 31 tankōbon volumes have been released and an anime series by Sanzigen aired from October to December 2013. The same studio also produced two films based on the series, released in January and October 2015.

== Plot ==
Due to global warming and rising sea levels in the early 21st century, much of Earth's landmass has been lost. In 2039, fleets of powerful sentient WW2 era warships, armed with advanced technology and possibly 'alien' weaponry, mysteriously appear and devastate the world's naval forces. These ships, collectively known as 'The Fleet of Fog', impose a worldwide naval and aerial blockade, preventing humanity from both traveling the oceans and to other nations. During the blockade, the Fleet of Fog created Mental Models, humanoid avatars containing a ship's Union core, as a means to develop self cultivation and to overcome their lack of creative thinking of tactics that humans possessed, which at the same time made the Mental Models develop their own unique personality.

In 2056, 17 years after the blockade began, Gunzō Chihaya, a former student of the Japanese National Marine Academy, is the captain of a small group of privateers called the 'Blue Steel'. The Blue Steel are infamous for possessing a Fog submarine, the I-401, along with its Mental Model Iona, who defected to the human side. Due to I-401's technology and Gunzō's tactical skills, the Blue Steel have not only survived several encounters with the Fleet of Fog but managed to sink one of their most powerful warships.

Gunzō and his crew are hired by a faction of the Japanese government to deliver the prototype of the vibration warhead, a powerful weapon that may finally allow mankind to fight back against the Fog, to the United States. The United States is the only country with the resources and capability to mass-produce the weapon system. However, the Blue Steel will face obstacles on their journey not only from the Fleet of Fog and their human allies, but from other governments and factions with their own agendas. Along the way they will also gain allies of their own from both sides, increasing their chances against seemingly overwhelming odds.

== Characters ==
=== Blue Steel Fleet ===
Gunzō Chihaya (千早 群像, Chihaya Gunzō)
Voiced by: Jun Fukuyama (Drama CD), Kazuyuki Okitsu (Anime)
The main protagonist, captain of the I-401 and leader of the Blue Steel Fleet. He is not interested in destroying the Fleet of Fog, but to be on equal footing with them so negotiations leading to peace can be realized.
Iona (イオナ, Iona) I-401
Voiced by: Aoi Yūki (Drama CD), Mai Fuchigami (Anime)
The Mental Model (human avatar) of the submarine I-401 who left the Fog to become Gunzō's vessel of her own volition.
Over the course of the series, Iona has developed human emotions which led the other Fog vessels to classify her as a traitor, but those who came in contact with her have either defected to the Fog, joined the Blue Steel fleet, or had the ship's mental model experience errors. After defeating Hyuga, the crew of the I-401 salvaged and mounted the battleship's Super Gravitational Cannon onto the bow of the submarine. In the manga, she has been shown to use the M6A Seiran dive bombers that her real life counterpart was equipped with, making her the only Fog vessel ever seen to utilize aircraft.

In the Cadenza movie, it was revealed that the supreme flagship Yamato was defeated by her sister Musashi after she went on a rampage and had carried her last wish into Iona herself, therefore the reason for carrying dual cores inside her, which was to be Gunzō's vessel and negotiate with the Fleet of Fog to end the war, which was Gunzō's father's actions. After defeating Musashi by becoming one with Yamato, she disappears as she had served her purpose and bids Gunzō farewell, but eventually returns to him.

Sō Oribe (織部 僧, Oribe Sō)
Voiced by: Tomokazu Sugita (Drama CD), Shinobu Matsumoto (Anime)
First Mate of I-401 who always wears a helmet supposedly due to allergies. He is Gunzō's closest friend and always knows what the latter is thinking. He wields the position as helmsman and executive-officer.
Kyōhei Kashihara (橿原 杏平, Kashihara Kyōhei)
Voiced by: Minoru Shiraishi (Drama CD), Eiji Miyashita (Anime)
Weapons officer of I-401. Unlike the rest of his friends in the Blue Steel who were the top ten during their Naval Academy days, Kyōhei was in the 200th place. He also owns a huge collection of gravure idols merchandise and usually is the first to panic when the crew finds themselves in a pinch.
Iori Watanuki (四月一日 いおり, Watanuki Iori)
Voiced by: Aki Toyosaki (Drama CD), Minami Tsuda (Anime)
Engineer of I-401 who operates the engines of the vessel.
Shizuka Hazumi (八月一日 静, Hazumi Shizuka)
Voiced by: Nao Tōyama
Sonar operator of I-401, she is also a capable soldier able to take down several troops with skill and strategy only. Her past is a mystery but it is known she's been to Taiwan.
Hyūga (ヒュウガ, Hyūga)
Voiced by: Saki Fujita
A former Fog battleship and flagship of the Second Oriental Fleet who was defeated by Iona and her crew. Gunzō and the others salvaged her Super Gravitational Cannon and installed it on I-401. Hyūga's Mental Model (human avatar) has since become the port operator for the Blue Steel, with her ship's weapons and Wave Force Armor becoming the defenses for the island. She has been obsessed with Iona since their battle and views Iona's closeness to Gunzō as a hindrance to her affections, as well as Takao. Nevertheless, she cares for her companions' safety and assists with anything they need. She is also known to be a hacker, able to access the Fog vessels' systems and hack them in order to keep her vessels safe.
In the Cadenza movie, she restores Takao's ship by consuming half of the Iwo Jima islands and travels with Takao to combat the Fog vessels of the student council in order to defeat Musashi.
Takao (タカオ, Takao)
Voiced by: Rina Satō (Drama CD), Manami Numakura (Anime)
The Mental Model (human avatar) of the Fog heavy cruiser Takao. After Gunzō defeats her in battle, Takao falls in love with him and later joins the Blue Steel fleet. She is almost destroyed for good by Zordan's fleet but is saved in the nick of time by a surprise attack from Iona and Hyūga. However, her core is salvaged by I-402 and delivered to Yamato, who assigns her to infiltrate a human facility in a special mission with the promise of being allowed to return to Gunzō's side once it is accomplished. The spin-off manga Salty Road follows Takao's days among other humans during said mission.
In the Ars Nova adaptation, Takao sacrifices her vessel self to save Gunzō and the critically damaged I-401. This results in a super submarine called the Ars Nova with the processing capabilities and firepower of both Takao and Iona. She existed in a digital form inside the submarine's computer systems. At the end of the anime she regains her Mental Model form. In the Cadenza movie, she regains her ship after negotiating as a messenger to the Japanese government of the vibration warheads' codes with the help of Hyuga's skills and enters combat to save I-401 from the fog's student council and buys time in order for I-401 to defeat Musashi. She was originally equipped with a Super Gravitational Cannon, but her rebuilt ship instead used two large drills borrowed from the old base on Iwo Jima, much to Takao's annoyance.

=== Japanese government and military ===
As a result of the blockade by the Fleet of Fog, both the Japanese government and Self-Defense Forces were reorganized. The government is led by the Prime Minister who deal with their own local affairs while making important decisions together for the entire nation. The JSDF became an actual military force with an Army, Navy and Air Force. The remnants of United States Forces Japan that were left stranded after the Fleet of Fog blockade were absorbed into the Japanese Military where many American servicemen ended up marrying Japanese nationals and starting families.

Nobuyoshi Kaede (かえで のぶよし, Kaede Nobuyoshi)
The Prime Minister of Japan. Kaede was Ryōkan Kita's former XO but was injured during the battle between the UN Naval Fleet and Fleet of Fog which left him in a wheelchair and the use of cybernetics to help him see and speak.
Ryūjirō Kamikage (上陰 龍二郎, Kamikage Ryūjirō)
Voiced by: Ryotaro Okiayu
The Assistant Secretary of Military Affairs. He hires Gunzō and the Blue Steel Fleet to transport the Vibration Torpedo, the first human made weapon capable of destroying a Fleet of Fog ship, to the United States for mass production. He faces rivalry with Ryōkan Kita and his supporters who have their own plans for the I-401.
Cruz Herder (クルツ・ハーダー, Kurutsu Hādā)
Voiced by: Hidenobu Kiuchi
A former United States Marine Corps officer, now a Japanese Navy Lieutenant and Commander of United States Forces Japan. He is an ally of Kamikage in helping the Blue Steel fleet in their mission to transport the Vibration Torpedo to the United States.
Ryōkan Kita (北 良寛, Kita Ryōkan)
Voiced by: Atsushi Ono
An influential member of the National Diet expected to be the next Prime Minister of Japan and Ryūjirō Kamikage's rival. A former captain of a Japanese Navy Destroyer, he was a veteran of the last Naval battle between the UN Naval Fleet and the Fleet of Fog. Kita wants the I-401 returned to the Japanese government so they can reverse engineer it and make their own Fleet of Fog ships which puts him at odds with Kamikage. He has connections within the Japanese Army who hope to regain their prestige after the government chose to focus on the Japanese Navy.
Hiroshi Uragami (浦上 博, Uragami Hiroshi)
Vice-Admiral of the Japanese Navy. He is Gunzō's ally since he knew his father and supports Kamikage's plans for the Blue Steel fleet.
Daisaku Komaki (駒城 大作, Komaki Daisaku)
Captain of Hakugei 3, Japan's newest attack submarine. Thanks to the help of the I-401, the Hakugei was able to defeat Kirishima and Haruna, becoming the first human vessel to defeat not one but two Fog ships. He and Ryūjirō are old friends.
Maruri Hibiki (響 真瑠璃, Hibiki Maruri)
Voiced by: Kana Hanazawa (Drama CD)
A Japanese naval academy third year midshipman brevet ranked as an Ensign when detached at sea and the former sonar operator of the I-401. She was a classmate of Gunzō during their academy days and was in love with him and was the first to join his crew. However, unable to stand seeing Gunzō endangering himself, she left the I-401 and rejoined the Japanese Navy.
Makoto Osakabe (刑部 眞, Osakabe Makoto)
The Prime Minister of Japan and Mayor of Sapporo. He was created through genetic engineering just like Makie to be a better government administrator. Due to his body not having natural bacteria to digest food, he takes special medication to eat. Makoto claims to have no emotions but cares about his creator Tōjūrō Osakabe and his sister Makie. As a favor to his creator, he warns him that the Japanese Army is planning to eliminate him and Makie after Haruna's identity is discovered and sends a team of Cyborg Special Forces to extract Makie to Hokkaido.

=== Fleet of Fog/Japan ===
This is the Fleet of Fog stationed in the Japanese territorial waters. They formed a blockade around Japan to prevent any human vessels and aircraft from fleeing to the open sea. There are 2 patrol fleets maintaining the blockade, the First and the Second Oriental Fleet. But when they found out that I-401 sinks Hyūga, the flagship of the Second Oriental Fleet, they are forced to reorganize, leaving a hole in the blockade. After they reorganize, Kongō is the new flagship of the Second Fleet while Nagato is the new flagship of the First Fleet.

Yamato (ヤマト, Yamato)
Voiced by: Mai Nakahara
The Supreme flagship of the Fleet of Fog and the one who gave the ability to the other ships to develop their own avatars. Yamato possesses two different avatars, one named after herself and another called Kotono. Both are modeled in appearance after the late Kotono Amaha, who was Gunzō's undefeated rival during his academy times and according to some of his friends, his love interest. It is uncertain if the Kotono Amaha that Gunzō knew was, in fact, human or Yamato's second avatar.
In the Cadenza movie, it was revealed that she and her sister Musashi had met up with Chihaya Shōzō, the then-admiral of the JMSDF in negotiating to end the war on the 2 sides and for both ends to live in harmony and peace. She then had doubts after which about the Admiralty code and agrees his proposal. But, after Shōzō was killed by the naval officers who deemed this as betrayal, she did not want to fight still due to her promise but was forced to after her sister Musashi's emotions became negative and starting going on a rampage to destroy the vessels commanded by the humans. Despite trying to stop her, She was eventually defeated and sunk. Before disappearing, she creates the I-401's Mental Model Iona and passes her will to her in hopes of ending the war. In the Cadenza film, she was reunited with Musashi after her defeat and accepted her, thanking Iona.
Kongō (コンゴウ, Kongō)
Voiced by: Houko Kuwashima (Drama CD), Yukana Nogami (Anime)
The flagship of the Second Oriental Fleet and Yamato's second in command.
In the Ars Nova adaptation, she pursues Iona and the other Mental Models who she believes to be acting abnormally due to their contact with Gunzō singlemindedly. After the intense fight with Iona at the end of the series, Iona befriends her after she realizes that her previously solitary life was somehow sad and lonely. After which, she leaves the Fleet of Fog to explore the world and does not join the Blue Steel Fleet. In the Cadenza film, her reformed self helps to save I-401 and restore her systems from the Student Council Fleet. She then engages in a fight with her sister Hiei, allowing I-401 to deal with Musashi.
Nagato (ナガト, Nagato)
The Flagship of the First Oriental Fleet and currently possesses two Mental Models. Nagato's interests lie within Japanese culture and she entertains herself by trying to act according to its customs.
Haruna (ハルナ, Haruna)
Voiced by: Hibiku Yamamura
A Fog battleship whose avatar takes the form of a teenage girl wearing a heavy coat that covers all of her body up to the nose. After a failed effort to defeat I-401, she befriends a girl named Makie and agrees to protect her after finding out the truth behind her, even if this means going against the Fog.
In the Ars Nova adaptation, both Haruna and Kirishima not only betray the Fog but also join the Blue Steel Fleet to serve their purpose. In the Cadenza film, She and kirishima restore their vessel therefore bearing a 2-in-1 ship and comes to assist I-401 in their battle with the Student Council Fleet, engaging Haguro to allow I-401 to escape and confront Musashi.
Kirishima (キリシマ, Kirishima)
Voiced by: Yumi Uchiyama
A Fog battleship who joined Haruna's effort to sink the I-401 in Yokosuka. Despite being able to combine with Haruna to form an even stronger vessel, both were defeated by I-401, with only her core surviving her destruction. It is later hidden inside a Teddy bear belonging to Makie. She slowly gets adjusted to using the Teddy bear as her stand-in Mental Model over the course of the series and assists the Blue Steel Fleet alongside Haruna and Makie.
Hiei (ヒエイ, Hiei)
Voiced by: M.A.O
Kongō's second in command and de facto leader of the Second Oriental Fleet after Kongō's disappearance. Her Mental Model is dressed as a high school student and governs over her subordinates in a system reflecting a student council, from which she is the self-proclaimed president. She's the sister ship of Kongō, Haruna and Kirishima.
In the Cadenza movie, she tasks the student council to destroy the I-401 having classified it as "Traitor of the Fog". She is later defeated by Kongō who stops her vessel, leaving it unmovable but not destroyed.
Ise (イセ, Ise)
One of Hiei's subordinates. Following the departure of Kongō and Hiei to hunt I-401 down, Ise becomes the acting flagship of the First Oriental Fleet. She is Hyuga's older sister.
Maya (マヤ, Maya)
Voiced by: MAKO
Assigned to act under Haruna's command, she remains faithful to her even after she decides to oppose the Admiralty Code. She plays various musical instruments and is annoyed if anyone ignores her.
In the Ars Nova adaptation, Maya's Mental Model is revealed to be nothing more than an AI assigned to watch over Kongō, lacking the true ability to form her own avatar. She is absorbed by Kongō later on and never existed after her vessel was destroyed in the process of the battle between I-401 and Kongo.
I-400 (イ400, I 400)
Voiced by: Aoi Yūki (Drama CD), Rina Hidaka (Anime)
One of two submarines who act directly under Yamato's orders and Iona's triplet sister. She is mostly seen wearing a Qipao. She and I-402 were defeated by I-401.
I-402 (イ402, I 402)
Voiced by: Aoi Yūki (Drama CD), Nozomi Yamamoto (Anime)
Another submarine directly under Yamato's orders and Iona's triplet sister. She is currently under Yamato's orders to keep watch on Takao during her mission at the Japanese Naval Academy while getting information from the locals. She and I-400 were defeated by I-401 later on.
Myōkō (ミョウコウ, Myoukou)
Voiced by: Ayaka Fukuhara
One of Hiei's subordinates, whose Mental Model is also dressed as a high school student. She wears an eyepatch which she uses to snipe enemies from outside their effective detection range; her vessel is equipped with long range sniper cannons.
Nachi (ナチ, Nachi)
Voiced by: Satomi Satou
One of Hiei's subordinates and Myōkō's younger sister. She is Ashigara's partner and serves as the sonar operator, detecting enemy vessels utilizing her sonar scanner.
Ashigara (アシガラ, Ashigara)
Voiced by: Suzuko Mimori
One of Hiei's subordinates, and Myōkō's younger sister. She's loud, brash, impatient and violent, who also tends to forget important things, such as when battling with the I-401 which she uses all her weapons on the submarine. She is equipped with a large energy harpoon firing from the seaplane catapult.
Haguro (ハグロ, Haguro)
Voiced by: Hiromi Igarashi
One of Hiei's subordinates and Myōkō's youngest sister, who seems to dislike wearing a school uniform. She is known to being the fastest ship of the Fog, having her vessel possessed with the most number of gravitation engines.
Atago (アタゴ, Atago)
One of Hiei's subordinates and is the only one besides Kongō who doesn't wear a uniform. She is the sister of Takao and Maya.
Akashi (アカシ, Akashi)
A repair vessel under Kongō's command that has been helping her set up the Flagship equipment.
Yukikaze (ユキカゼ, Yukikaze)
A destroyer that is a part of Yamato's personal guards. Even though she's just a destroyer, Yamato authorized her to have a Mental Model.
Zuikaku (ズイカク, Zuikaku)
An Assault and Suppression vessel and one of largest vessels in the Fleet of Fog. Her Mental Model looks like a young girl and owns a pet cat. Although based on an aircraft carrier, Zuikaku was re-purposed into an assault and suppression vessel following the reveal that the copies of WWII aircraft that Fleet of Fog created were no match for fifth-generation jet fighters that humanity possessed at the time of the fleet's awakening. Zuikaku transported I-402 and Takao to the Yokosuka city suburbs so that the heavy cruiser could infiltrate the Japanese National Maritime Institute of Technology.

=== Fleet of Fog/Europe (Scarlet Fleet) ===
Shōzō Chihaya (千早 翔像, Chihaya Shōzō)
Voiced by: Jouji Nakata
Gunzō's father who was a war hero during the last battle between the UN Naval Fleet and the Fleet of Fog, where he and his crew managed to capture the I-401 submarine. Shōzō was presumed to have died when he and his crew mysteriously disappeared after the I-401s maiden voyage to the Pacific only for the submarine to return to Japan a year later without its crew. However, two years before the start of the series, a spy drone discovered Shōzō and his crew were alive and on board the Fog warship Musashi, revealing they had defected to the Fleet of Fog. Now in command of the European Fleet of Fog, now known as the Scarlet Fleet, together with his flagship and avatar Musashi, the Scarlet Fleet forms an alliance with the United Kingdom to end the European War.
However, in the Cadenza film, it was revealed that Shōzō was actually an imitation created by Musashi. Prior to the series, being the then admiral of the JMSDF, Shōzō had negotiated with Musashi's elder sister Yamato into ending the war, to which she agreed. He was later killed by soldiers of the JMSDF who claimed that he had betrayed the navy. Therefore, he had never defected to the Fog to begin with.
Musashi (ムサシ, Musashi)
Voiced by: Rie Kugimiya
Shōzō's flagship whose avatar is a blonde woman in a white coat. In the anime series, she has long white hair and wears a black swimsuit.
In the Cadenza movie, she and her sister Yamato agreed with Shōzō in a negotiation to end the war between the 2 sides. Initially she was a kind and shy girl, but after seeing the death of Shōzō by the soldiers of the JMSDF, she turns dark, ruthless and violent and begins attacking and destroying the JMSDF ships and even destroys her sister Yamato, who had tried to stop her. Ever since then, she becomes the Supreme flagship of the fog, and to hide her traumas, she created an AI of Shōzō who acts according to her wish. But eventually, she was defeated by Iona who had used Yamato's parts to become one with Yamato and reunites with her sister.
Bismarck (ビスマルク, Bisumaruku)
Two blond twin girls who are the avatars of the Bismarck. While capital ship Bismarck is often mentioned when one brings up the Admiralty Code, Bismarck herself hasn't been seen doing anything at all. She remains a passive observer at the moment.
Zordan Stark (ゾルダン・スターク, Zorudan Sutāku)
Captain of the U-2501 under orders of Shōzō to intercept the Blue Steel.
Romuald
The U-2501's weapons officer.
Francette
The U-2501's sonar operator.
U-2501
Zordan's submarine Mental Model, who is forbidden to materialize it by him, as he claims it is unnecessary for a human-crewed ship. She has no known sisters, but is accompanied by a fleet of over three dozen "Seehund" miniature drone submarines and the resupply vessel Milchkuh. U-2501 is currently serving as a traitor-hunting submarine of the "Scarlet Fleet". U-2501 has a Mirror-Ring system installed: this allows her to absorb and then release as a shock-wave an attack of almost any power. It is unclear where from U-2501 received this upgrade, as no Fog submarine has enough power to have Mirror-Ring system of her own, with it usually only seen on battleships like Hiei, Musashi, and Yamato.
Repulse
A Fog battle-cruiser whose Mental Model appears dressed as a maid. She and Vampire are chased by a rogue element of the Fleet of Fog led by Hood who want the two vessels to join them, as they believe that Shōzō has abused his authority within the Fleet for his own plans and want him stopped. Repulse and Vampire have no interest in Hood's plans and wish to continue their original duty of maintaining the blockade, but they develop an interest in the Hakugei after the human vessel intervene in a battle against their pursuers on their favor. She is shy to meet Komaki and Hakugei's crew.
Vampire
A destroyer on the run with Repulse. She has no processing power enough to maintain a Mental Model, thus Repulse lent her some to create one, that just like Repulse's, appears dressed as a maid, albeit with a slight vampire-like theme. She is foul-mouthed and appears to be rather bratty.
Prince of Wales
Appears as a maid just like Repulse. She appeared to lead "persuasion" Repulse and Vampire to join Hood to suppress Shōzō Chihaya, and if that fails, to sink and repossess their cores.
Lexington'
The first American ship seen in the series, Lexington behaves a lot like a 'genius ditz'. She's always surrounded by a mess in the form of multiple books, coffee mugs, and various trinkets she studies or works with. Usually, she's not very motivated, calling U-2501 an "unpleasant guest" and paying more attention to her books and trinkets than to Zordan Stark when he tries actually conversing with her. She had one Mental Model that looks like a rather tall and slender woman in her early twenties. While claiming her intention was to assist Kongō's fleet in fighting against I-401, Lexington has yet to make any hostile moves against I-401 and ends up engaged U-2501 in combat for a short time. It is later revealed that Lexington had been working ashore for the past year and a half as a university professor (with forged papers) and has a fascination with history.

=== Civilians ===
Makie Osakabe (刑部 蒔絵, Osakabe Makie)
Voiced by: Sayuri Hara
A "Design Child" who was genetically engineered to possess outstanding intellect. Of many attempts, she was the only one to survive past infancy. She developed the Vibration Torpedo, the secret weapon tasked to the Blue Steel. She is under the protection of Haruna and Kirishima after the military tried to assassinate her. She was on the bridge of the combined battleship formed by her two guardians during the final battle in the Arctic.
Lawrence Valentine/Tōjūrō Osakabe (刑部 藤十郎, Osakabe Tōjūrō)
Voiced by: Kouji Yusa
Makie's butler who, unknown to her, is actually her "grandfather" Tōjūrō Osakabe, the creator of the design children. During the turmoil following the Fleet of Fog's blockade, Tōjūrō was tasked to create genetically engineered children that would help Japan survive. Tōjūrō, however, regrets creating the design children since only seven of the hundreds, if not thousands, were able to live. When the government plans to eliminate Makie after she designs the Vibration Torpedo, Tōjūrō uses his connections with the government to make a deal where they will spare her and provide her with a mansion under government surveillance with him as her butler. When he learns that Makie's new friend is actually the Fog Mental Model Haruna and the Japanese Army sends forces to not only capture Haruna but kill Makie to prevent the secrets of the Vibration Torpedo being exposed, he asks Haruna to protect Makie and help her escape Japan. Tōjūrō is killed after he stops an Army sniper trying to shoot Makie.
In the Ars Nova adaptation, Tōjūrō was a scientist tasked in creating the Vibration Torpedo but failed since he did not have the intellect to overcome the Torpedo's flaws. Therefore he created the genetically engineered Makie, who he treated as his own daughter. But when the government ordered him to create another design child to take over the Vibration Torpedo project as they now saw Makie as useless and planned to dispose of her, Tōjūrō faked his own death to ensure that the government could not create another design child and forced them to rely on Makie. By the time Haruna and Kirishima discover that he is still alive, the bedridden Tōjūrō has hidden himself under his mansion and watches over Makie via cameras. He asks the Mental Models to protect Makie and be her friends before he passes away.
Saori Chihaya (千早 沙保里, Chihaya Saori)
Gunzō's mother and Shōzō's wife who is under house arrest for her own protection after her son and her husband deserted the Japanese military. She meets and befriends Takao when Takao decides to experience human life and unbeknownst to her, successfully deduces Takao's identity as a Mental Model.

== Media ==
=== Manga ===
The manga began serialization on September 30, 2009, in Shōnen Gahōsha's Young King OURs magazine. The first tankōbon volume was released on April 30, 2010; thirty-one volumes have been published as of August 28, 2026. A guide book which contain a short story and Drama CD was also released. The series was licensed by Seven Seas Entertainment in July 2013, who released the first volume on July 1, 2014; nineteen volumes have been released as of November 2021.

A spin-off manga illustrated by TALI titled Salty Road which focuses on Takao, I-402, and Zuikaku during their infiltration of Yokosuka, began serialization on October 16, 2014, in Young King OURs magazine.

No.	Original release date	Original ISBN	English release date	English ISBN
1	April 30, 2010	978-4-7859-3375-3	July 1, 2014	978-1-626920-68-2
2	October 30, 2010	978-4-7859-3495-8	October 21, 2014	978-1-626920-76-7
3	March 30, 2011	978-4-7859-3593-1	January 20, 2015	978-1-626921-00-9
4	October 29, 2011	978-4-7859-3726-3	April 7, 2015	978-1-626921-25-2
5	April 28, 2012	978-4-7859-3831-4	July 21, 2015	978-1-626921-57-3
6	October 30, 2012	978-4-7859-3954-0	January 12, 2016	978-1-626922-01-3
7	May 30, 2013	978-4-7859-5056-9	May 3, 2016	978-1-626922-66-2
8	October 30, 2013	978-4-7859-5150-4	September 20, 2016	978-1-626923-26-3
9	June 30, 2014	978-4-7859-5327-0	January 10, 2017	978-1-626923-80-5
10	December 26, 2014	978-4-7859-5460-4	May 2, 2017	978-1-626924-59-8
11	July 30, 2015	978-4-7859-5599-1	September 5, 2017	978-1-626925-43-4
12	April 30, 2016	978-4-7859-5762-9	December 19, 2017	978-1-626925-87-8
13	November 30, 2016	978-4-7859-5915-9	August 21, 2018	978-1-626928-79-4
14	June 30, 2017	978-4-7859-6034-6	March 26, 2019	978-1-626929-14-2
15	November 30, 2017	978-4-7859-6076-6	November 12, 2019	978-1-642751-35-2
16	July 30, 2018	978-4-7859-6254-8	November 10, 2020	978-1-64505-514-3
17	February 27, 2019	978-4-7859-6392-7	March 9, 2021	978-1-64505-801-4
18	October 1, 2019	978-4-7859-6488-7	June 8, 2021	978-1-64827-227-1
19	June 1, 2020	978-4-7859-6685-0	November 30, 2021	978-1-64827-924-9
20	October 30, 2020	978-4-7859-6785-7	Never ended up releasing	978-1-63858-184-0
21	June 30, 2021	978-4-7859-6940-0	Never ended up releasing	978-1-63858-329-5
22	December 27, 2021	978-4-7859-7061-1	—	—
23	August 30, 2022	978-4-7859-7215-8	—	—
24	December 28, 2022	978-4-7859-7219-6	—	—
25	June 29, 2023	978-4-7859-7432-9	—	—
26	November 30, 2023	978-4-7859-7547-0	—	—
27	May 30, 2024	978-4-7859-7649-1	—	—
28	October 30, 2024	978-4-7859-7800-6	—	—
29	July 30, 2025	978-4-7859-7992-8	—	—
30	January 30, 2026	978-4-7859-8133-4	—	—
31	August 28, 2026	978-4-7859-8271-3	—	—

=== Anime ===
A CG rendered anime produced by Sanzigen titled Arpeggio of Blue Steel -Ars Nova-, began airing on October 7, 2013. The opening theme song is "Savior of Song" performed by Nano and MY FIRST STORY, and the two ending theme songs are performed by Trident which is composed of Mai Fuchigami, Manami Numakura, and Hibiku Yamamura: "Blue Field (ブルー・フィールド)" and "Innocent Blue". The television series features an anime original ending that differs from the plot of the manga. The rerun of the series on TV during 2014 was accompanied by a tie-in series of comedy shorts titled Kiri-Kuma's (Fog Bears) featuring the Fog characters in bear form. The anime television series has been licensed in North America by Crunchyroll, with distribution by Discotek Media, and they've released a Blu-ray/DVD Combo Pack of the series on November 4, 2016.

In September 2013, it was announced that there would be a collaborative project between the Arpeggio of Blue Steel anime and the online game Kantai Collection. Illustrators for Kadokawa Games, including Shibafu and Konishi, are responsible for drawing some of the end cards, which feature crossovers with Kantai Collection characters. An Arpeggio of Blue Steel in-game special event for Kantai Collection also took place from 24 December 2013 to 6 January 2014.

In June 2014, two animated films based on the manga were announced. The first, titled Arpeggio of Blue Steel -Ars Nova DC-, is a compilation of the TV series with extra scenes in its first half, with a new story in its second half. Nano performs the theme song, titled "Rock on.". The second film is an all new story. Both films were produced by the same staff of the anime series and released in 2015.

In 2017, scholar Takayoshi Yamamura noted that anime was produced with the collaboration of JSDF Yokosuka District Headquarters and other parts of the JSDF.

==== Episode list ====
No.	Title	Endcard	Original release date
1	"Those with Shipping Routes" "Kōro o motsu mono" (Japanese: 航路を持つ者)	Shibafu	October 7, 2013
In the near future, mankind has been driven away from the seas and landmasses are forcibly isolated from each other with the arrival of the "Fleet of Fog"; AI controlled ships possessing superior technology and firepower. Despite the combined efforts of the UN, the Fleet of Fog manage to destroy all opposition and throw the world into a state of turmoil. Years later, the Japanese Government is preparing to send an unmanned cargo shuttle into orbit. The Fleet of Fog ship Nagara appears and attempts to assault the launch site. The launch is a success when the human-crewed Fog submarine I-401 defeats the enemy at request of the government. After the battle, I-401's captain Gunzō Chihaya reminisces with the vessel's mental model, a human avatar called Iona, about their first meeting two years ago. It was during this time that I-401 was under human custody for years, unresponsive until Gunzō came in contact with it, awakening Iona. After Iona reveals that she had instructions to serve under him, Gunzō agrees to join forces with her and they flee together. In the present, Gunzō is approached by Ryūjirō Kamikage, the Assistant Secretary of Military Affairs, who reveals that the shuttle was destroyed before accomplishing its task; deliver the plans of a new weapon developed to fight the ships of the Fog to the United States as Japan now lacks the resources required to mass produce it. Accepting the task of crossing the Pacific Ocean to take the plans to the US by themselves, Gunzō and his crew depart to resupply at Yokosuka Base. Meanwhile, taking heed of I-401's approach, the Fog's heavy cruiser Takao prepares herself to engage it.
2	"Into the Storm" "Arashi no naka e" (Japanese: 嵐の中へ)	Tomoko Fujinoki	October 14, 2013
Takao blocks I-401's path to Yokosuka by positioning herself inside the eye of a typhoon and, after asserting that any attempts to avoid confrontation are too risky, Gunzō decides to take Takao head on. After Iona barely manages to evade an attack from Takao's Super Gravity Cannon, Gunzō analyzes the resultant combat data and points out that Takao's attacks have had pinpoint accuracy from a distance much greater than its sensor capabilities. He concludes that this can only be possible if there is a second vessel possessing superior sensor technologies nearby, hypothesizing that a submarine is being concealed under Takao's hull. Gunzō then orders the crew to ready their own Super Gravity Cannon which they salvaged from their previous battle with the Fog battleship Hyūga and uses it to destroy the submarine and force Takao to surrender. Having her systems locked down for 24 hours by Iona to prevent her from give chase to the I-401, Takao wonders why Gunzō spared her and takes an interest in him.
3	"The Fortress Port of Yokosuka" "Yosai Kō Yokosuka" (Japanese: 要塞港 横須賀)	Konishi	October 21, 2013
I-401 and her crew reach Yokosuka Base for repairs and resupply, and Gunzō takes Iona for a visit to a Navy memorial for those that died in the war against the Fleet of Fog. Soon after, they are taken against their will by the Japanese Army with the rest of the crew to meet Ryōkan Kita, a former member of the Navy and an influential politician who attempts to convince Gunzō to relinquish the I-401 to the Japanese Army with no success. Meanwhile, Takao is approached by the mental models of Fog surveillance submarines I-400 and I-402 and reveals her intentions to abandon the fleet and join Gunzō's side. However, she is informed by them that two Fog battleships have been dispatched to sink the I-401 and Takao leaves, claiming that she will wait for Gunzō at another location. When Yokosuka Port comes under attack by the battleships Haruna and Kirishima, Gunzō and his crew return to their submarine. Subduing all resistance from Kita and his men, they prepare themselves to confront the new enemies before them.
4	"Assault on Yokosuka" "Yokosuka Kyūshū" (Japanese: 横須賀急襲)	Natsumoto Masato	October 28, 2013
The battle against Haruna and Kirishima begins with I-401 drawing them into a trap they set in the ruins of the old Yokosuka city. Although it fails to cause any significant damage, I-401 is able to circle around the two battleships undetected and launch a surprise attack using the now sunk Japanese battleship Mikasa as a decoy. However, Kirishima manages to avoid being hit and launches a retaliatory barrage of warheads. I-401 manages to barely avoid the attack. In an attempt to destroy I-401, Haruna and Kirishima join together and generate a huge gap in the water, trapping I-401 in the line of fire of their combined Super Gravity Cannon. Just before firing, however, they leave themselves vulnerable to Iona's last Erosion Torpedo which had been concealed inside Mikasa's wreckage. This triggers a chain reaction, destroying both ships. Haruna's mental model manages to salvage Kirishima's core and escape the ensuing destruction. The next day, a child finds the unconscious Haruna inside an abandoned warehouse.
5	"Not Human" "Hito Narazaru Mono" (Japanese: 人ならざる者)	Konishi	November 4, 2013
The I-401 returns to Yokosuka to pick up the secret weapon developed by the Japanese Government, the "Vibration Warhead", before returning to their base at Iwo Jima to make the final preparations for its journey across the Pacific. Meanwhile, Haruna awakens and meets Makie Osakabe, the child who rescued her. Pretending to be a human, Haruna keeps Makie company while Kirishima's core uses some of her nanomachines to make a spare body for her out of a Teddy bear. Takao arrives at Iwo Jima ahead of I-401 but is stopped by a vicious attack from unknown origin. Realizing that Makie is related to the deceased Tōjūrō Osakabe, the creator of the Vibration Warhead, Haruna and Kirishima contact their flagship Kongō and are instructed to investigate further. In the occasion, the two mental models are introduced to Tōjūrō, who is revealed to be alive, but bedridden. Tōjūrō reveals that after several failed attempts to develop a weapon to counter the Fleet of Fog, he came with a plan to create an artificial being with superior intellect capable to succeed where he did not, and the only surviving offspring of said project is Makie, who was the true creator of the Vibration Warhead. To protect Makie from the government, Tōjūrō forged his death and kept watching over her from the shadows but knowing he has not much time left and seeing how attached she became to them, he asks Haruna and Kirishima to take care of her. However, the army is already aware that Makie had made contact with ships of the Fog, and sends a unit to dispose of her.
6	"Friends" "Tomodachi" (Japanese: ともだち)	Ishiguro Masakazu	November 11, 2013
As Tōjūrō passes away, Haruna decides to protect Makie and asks Kirishima's help for it. Despite facing some heavy opposition, Haruna refrains from killing the attackers and orders Kirishima to flee with Makie, while she creates a decoy with her nanomachines to draw the military's attention. However, the soldiers see through Haruna's trick and start searching for Makie who is distraught with learning that she created a weapon that can destroy Haruna. Once reunited, Haruna, Kirishima and Makie are driven to a corner when Haruna asks for anyone's help, and Iona answers her call. Gunzō is contacted by Kamikage and replies to him that the I-401 and its crew were hired just to deliver the vibration warhead to the US and beside it, they will do as they please. Once the army retreats, Iona takes the three of them to the submarine and Haruna asks Makie to become her and Kirishima's friends to which she agrees. As the I-401 departs for Iwo Jima, Takao awakens in a room, greeted by a mysterious voice who asks for her intentions.
7	"Iwo Jima" "Iō-tō" (Japanese: 硫黄島)	Mikoto Akemi	November 18, 2013
Taking Haruna, Kirishima and Makie with them, the I-401 and its crew arrive at their base in Iwo Jima, where they are greeted by the fast battleship Hyuga's mental model who was guarding the island for them, and much by their surprise, they meet Takao once again. As Hyuga makes repairs on I-401, Gunzō and his crew prepare to abandon the base as there are few supplies left and they know that delivering the vibration torpedo to the United States may ensure their objective, which is to put mankind and the Fog on equal terms, which may lead to the end of the blockade. By Hyuga's suggestion, Takao considers joining Gunzō and the others' side while Haruna and Kirishima are contacted by Kongō who asks for their intentions. While Haruna affirms that she will not return to the Fleet of Fog for Makie's sake, Kirishima claims that she will continue by their side for the sake of gathering info. Kongō then assembles her fleet and prepares an assault on Iwo Jima.
8	"House of Dolls" "Ningyō no Ie" (Japanese: 人形の家)	Kotobuki Tsukasa	November 25, 2013
With Iwo Jima surrounded by the enemy fleet, Hyuga makes contact with Kongō by Gunzō's request, asking for a parley with her mental model before they begin hostilities. Kongō answers her call and she rendezvous with them at the beach, accompanied by the Heavy Cruiser Maya. As the rest of the crew remain on standby aboard the I-401, Gunzō discuss with Kongō and the other mental models about the real intentions of the Fleet of Fog and learns from her that she and the other ships have only one purpose, which is to follow the "Admiralty Code" that instructed them to chase the humans away from the seas and prevent all contact overseas between them. Instead of discussing the matter further, Gunzō invites the guests for a barbecue at the beach where Kongō asks Iona about the reason why all ships who come in contact with her start displaying a behavior independent from the Admiralty Code, but when she refrains from responding, Kongō claims that she will not fall by their trap and it is revealed that both her and Maya's mental models are actually decoys, with their cores being safely guarded at their respective ships to prevent them from being influenced by human behavior, before they begin to attack. Hyuga has a hard time defending the island against the enemy barrage until Takao, Haruna and Kirishima step in to assist her. Disappointed that he and Kongō could not see eye to eye, Gunzō declares that it's up to him to find a way past her and deliver the vibration torpedo to the United States.
9	"Desperate Escape" "Kesshi no dasshutsugyō" (Japanese: 決死の脱出行)	Parsley	December 2, 2013
Hyuga stays behind deflecting the attacks of Kongō's fleet to buy time for Iona and the others to escape. Before leaving Iwo Jima, Gunzō asks for Takao's help and she agrees to join his side. Unwilling to listen to Hyuga's words, Kongō fires her Super Gravity Cannon at her but fails to destroy her and orders Maya to fire her own cannon at the exhausted Hyuga but Takao appears in the nick of time to block Maya's shot. Believing that Hyuga and Takao are just covering the I-401's escape, Kongō tracks her down and gives chase, refusing to slow down even after passing through a minefield. Iona tries to reason with Kongō with no success and when the battleship attempts to fire her Super Gravity Cannon underwater to sink her, Hyuga takes advantage of Kongō's distraction to hack into her systems and have her lose control to buy enough time for Iona and Gunzō to escape. Takao then reveals to Kongō that instead of Takao, the true decoy was Iona herself, while the vibration warhead, Makie, Haruna, Kirishima and the rest of the I-401's crew were safely hidden aboard her and she returns to pick up Hyuga to rendezvous with Iona and Gunzō, who despite escaping from Kongō's grasp, are later ambushed and sunk by I-400 and I-402.
10	"Devotion of Self" "Sono Mi o Sasagu" (Japanese: その身を捧ぐ)	Mizukami Satoshi	December 9, 2013
With her nanomaterials compromised by her sister ships attack, the I-401 sinks into the deep ocean while Iona tends to an injured Gunzō. Meanwhile, Takao and the others look for them but all communications and radar are jammed by spatial distortions from the last battle. Despite knowing that the only way for her to survive is to abandon her captain, Iona refuses to do so until Gunzō orders her to cut all life support systems, claiming that fulfilling their mission to deliver the vibration warhead is more important than saving him. However, when Gunzō stops responding, a distraught Iona breaks down her own mental model to create a survival pod for him and her core. When Takao locates the pod, she decides to sacrifice her own body and use its nanomaterials to restore Iona and the I-401, bringing them back to the surface and saving Gunzō's life. Once knowing that the I-401 has not perished, Kongō can't hide the urge to fight it again, but declaring that she is displaying the same erratic behavior seen in the other ships who deviated from the Admiralty Code, I-400 and I-402 relieve her from duty and lock down her systems. In the occasion, Kongō finds out that Maya's mental model lacks consciousness, being a fake artificial intelligence created just to watch over her.
11	"Sisters" "Shimai" (Japanese: 姉妹)	Fujikawa	December 16, 2013
On their way to Hawaii, their next stop of their journey to deliver the vibration warhead in San Diego, the restored and upgraded I-401, called the Ars Nova, is chased by several Nagara class ships that are surprised and sunk when Gunzō orders an unexpected maneuver to sweep them all at once. After the battle, it is revealed that despite losing her physical body, Takao's core is still intact and she is now part of the I-401's systems. However, knowing that they are still being followed by I-400 and I-402, Gunzō decides to confront them. Before the battle, Iona's sisters make contact with her asking for her true intentions but she claims it is too difficult to explain with words. Meanwhile, an imprisoned Kongō breaks free and absorbs Maya along all the other ships around her. To confound their enemies, the I-401 moves forward along two decoys with increased capabilities, thanks to Hyuga, Haruna and Kirishima's direct control over them. After exchanging some fire, Iona contacts her sisters asking them to stop pursuing them before it is too late but they refuse to comply. When I-400 is about to be stricken by surprise, I-402 sacrifices herself to protect her sister, who despite finding this decision illogical, becomes driven into anger, leading her to fall into a trap set by the decoys and her defeat as well. Despite grieving for her lost sisters, Iona maintains her resolve to follow Gunzō to the end. However, the I-401 is soon after approached by a dozen ships from the American Fleet of Fog at the front, and a massive flying object at the back, composed of several fused ships led by Kongō, who claims that she will be the one who will sink I-401.
12	"The Power to Open a Path" "Kōro o Hiraku Chikara" (Japanese: 航路を拓く力)	Ark Performance	December 23, 2013
Kongō obliterates the ships of the American Fleet of Fog and Iona, along the other mental models, make contact with Kongō in an attempt to bring her to her senses. However, Kongō claims that it's her duty to prevent further anomalies to the Fog by destroying Iona and all ships who come in contact with her, including herself, before locking down all communications. After barely deflecting an attack of Kongō's enhanced Super Gravity Cannon, the I-401 conceals itself, knowing that confronting her directly is useless, when Iona decides to reach Kongō and confront her face to face. Gunzō agrees with her plan and after evading a massive barrage of attacks, Iona boards a torpedo to reach Kongō's deck. Iona attempts to reason with Kongō who keeps attacking her until she finally traps Iona and prepares to self destruct herself to kill both, when the sequence is disrupted by I-401's Super Gravity Cannon. In the end, Iona succeeds to dissuade Kongō and prevents the destruction of both. The reformed Kongō befriends Iona while the superstructure created by her collapses. Days later, as the I-401's crew delivers the vibration warhead to the U.S. Navy as intended, Takao's body is restored and they return to the sea, hoping that their actions have helped change the world for the better.

== Reception ==
The manga was nominated for the 22nd Tezuka Osamu Cultural Prize in 2018. The film Arpeggio of Blue Steel -Ars Nova Cadenza- was seventh place on its opening weekend, with US$562,000.
