= Japanese submarine I-400 =

Imperial Japanese Navy Submarine aircraft carrier

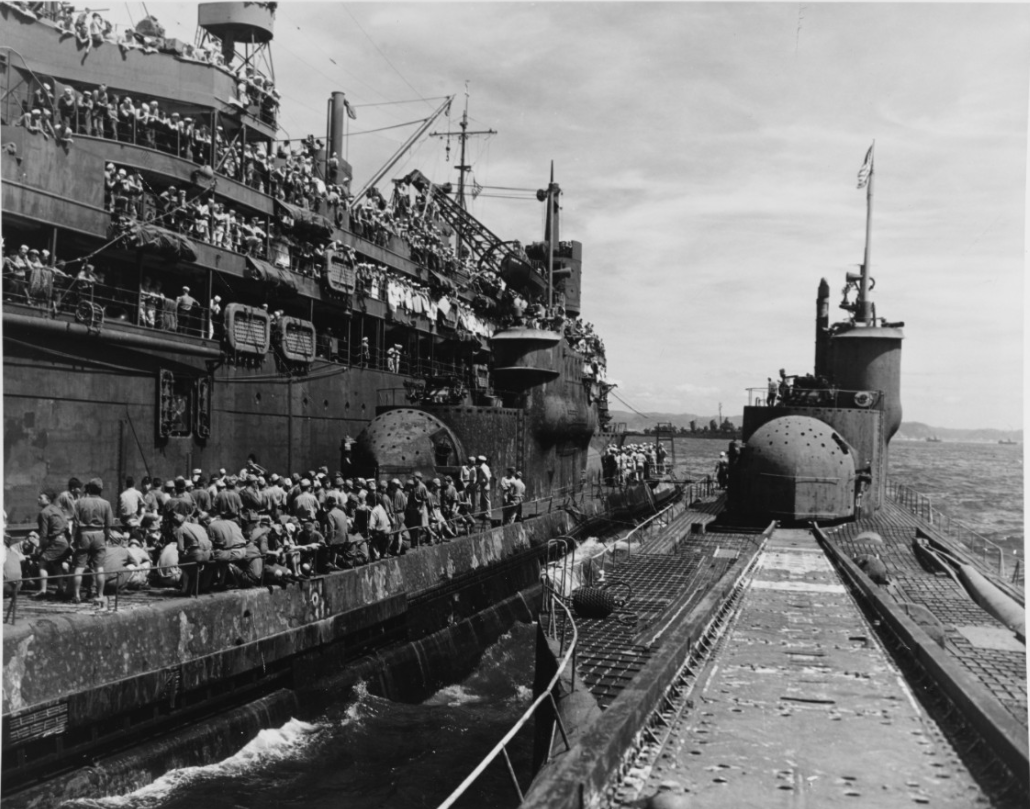
- I-400 (right) with the U.S. Navy submarine tender USS Proteus (AS-19) (left) and Japanese submarine I-14 (center) in port in Japan in 1945 after the end of World War II.

History

Japan
- Name: I-400
- Builder: Kure Naval Arsenal, Kure, Japan
- Laid down: 18 January 1943
- Launched: 18 January 1944
- Completed: 30 December 1944
- Commissioned: 30 December 1944
- Stricken: 15 September 1945
- Fate: Surrendered 27 August 1945; Sunk as target 4 June 1946

General characteristics
- Class & type: I-400-class submarine
- Displacement: 5,223 long tons (5,307 t) surfaced; 6,560 long tons (6,665 t) submerged
- Length: 122 m (400 ft)
- Beam: 12 m (39 ft)
- Draft: 7 m (23 ft)
- Propulsion: Diesel-electric; 4 diesel engines, 7,700 hp (5,700 kW); Electric motors, 2,400 hp (1,800 kW)
- Speed: 18.75 knots (21.58 mph; 34.73 km/h) surfaced; 6.5 kn (7.5 mph; 12.0 km/h) submerged
- Range: 37,500 nmi (69,400 km) at 14 kn (16 mph; 26 km/h)
- Test depth: 100 m (330 ft)
- Complement: 144
- Armament: 8 × 533 mm (21 in) forward torpedo tubes; 20 × Type 95 torpedoes; 1 × 14 cm/40 11th Year Type naval gun; 3 × 25 mm (1.0 in) 3-barrel machine gun; 1 × Type 96 25 mm (0.98 in) machine gun
- Aircraft carried: 3 × Aichi M6A1 Seiran sea-planes

I-400 (伊号第四百潜水艦, I-gō-dai yon-hyaku-sensuikan) was an Imperial Japanese Navy Sentoku-type (or I-400-class) submarine commissioned in 1944 for service in World War II. Capable of carrying three two-seat Aichi M6A1 "Seiran" (Mountain Haze) float-equipped torpedo bombers, the Sentoku-class submarines were built to launch a surprise air strike against the Panama Canal. Until 1965, the Sentaku-type submarines—I-400 and her sister ships I-401 and I-402 —were the largest submarines ever commissioned.

== Design and description ==
The I-400-class submarines had four 1,680 kW (2,250 hp) diesel engines and carried enough fuel to circumnavigate the world one-and-a-half times. Measuring 122 m (400 ft) long overall, they displaced 5,900 t (6,504 short tons), more than double their typical American contemporaries. Until the commissioning of the United States Navy ballistic missile submarine USS Benjamin Franklin (SSBN-640) in 1965, the I-400-class were the largest submarines ever commissioned.

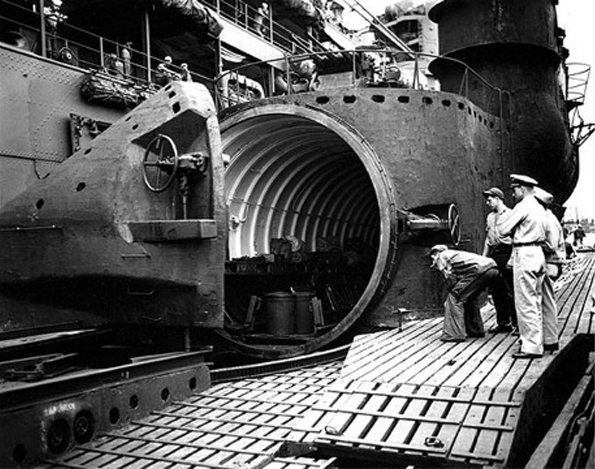
U.S. Navy personnel inspect I-400′s aircraft hangar after World War II.

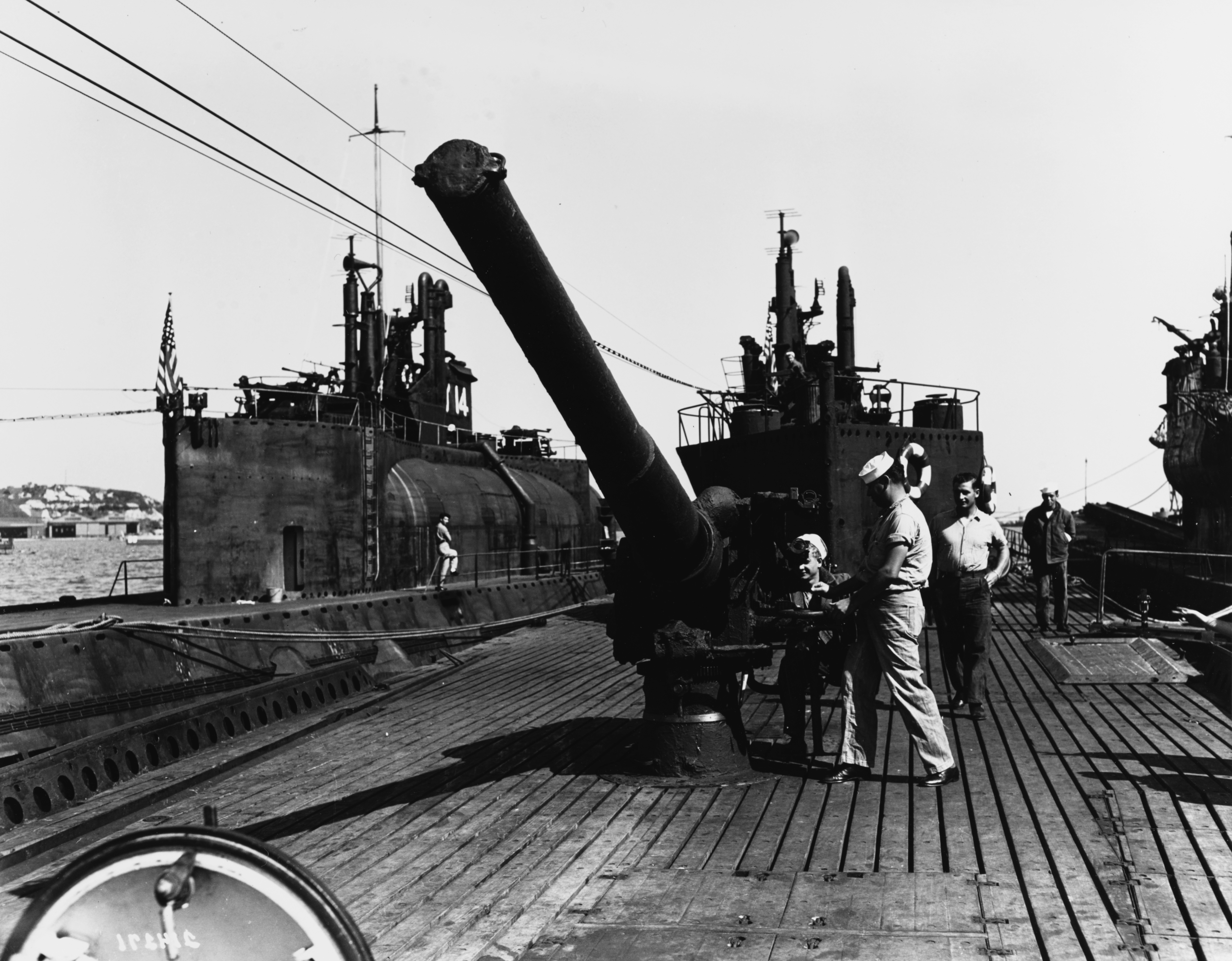
U.S. Navy personnel examine I-400′s deck gun at Yokosuka, Japan, on 14 October 1945.

The cross-section of the pressure hull had a unique figure-of-eight shape which afforded the strength and stability to support the weight of a large, cylindrical, watertight aircraft hangar, 31 meters (102 ft) long and 3.5 meters (11 ft) in diameter, located approximately amidships on the top deck. The conning tower was offset to port to allow the stowage of three Aichi M6A1 Seiran ("Clear Sky Storm") float-equipped torpedo bombers along the centerline. Aircraft were launched from a 37-meter (120 ft) catapult on the forward deck forward of the hangar. A collapsible crane allowed the submarine to retrieve her floatplanes from the water.

In addition to the three floatplanes, each I-400-class submarine was armed with eight 533-millimeter (21 in) torpedo tubes, all in the bow, with 20 Type 95 torpedoes, a Type 11 140 mm (5.5 in) deck gun aft of the hangar, three waterproofed Type 96 triple-mount antiaircraft guns mounted atop the hangar—one forward and two aft of the conning tower—and a single Type 96 25 mm antiaircraft gun mounted just aft of the bridge.

I-400-class submarines had a rather noisy special trim system that allowed them to loiter submerged and stationary while awaiting the return of their aircraft; demagnetization cables meant to protect against magnetic mines by nullifying the submarine's magnetic field; an air search radar, two air/surface-search radar sets, and a radar warning receiver; and an anechoic coating intended to make detection of the submarine while submerged more difficult by absorbing or diffusing sonar pulses and dampening reverberations from the submarine's internal machinery.

== Construction and commissioning ==
Ordered as Submarine No. 5231, I-400 was laid down on 18 January 1943 by the Kure Naval Arsenal at Kure, Japan. She was launched a year later on 18 January 1944, and was completed and commissioned on 30 December 1944.

== Service history ==
=== World War II ===
==== January–May 1945 ====
Upon commissioning, I-400 was attached to the Kure Naval District and assigned to Submarine Division 1 in the 6th Fleet. She also was assigned to Submarine Squadron 11 for workups. She got underway from Sasebo on the day of her commissioning to begin workups in the western Seto Inland Sea with the submarine I-13, joined in January 1945 by I-400′s sister ship I-401. After the United States Army Air Forces conducted a major fire-bombing raid on Tokyo on the night of 9–10 March 1945, the 6th Fleet proposed to the Imperial Japanese Navy General Staff a retaliatory raid on San Francisco, California, by Aichi M6A1 Seiran floatplane bombers launched by the submarines of Submarine Division 1, but by April 1945 the staff's vice chief, Vice Admiral Jisaburō Ozawa, had rejected the proposal.

I-400 was in drydock at Kure, Japan, on 19 March 1945 when the United States Navy's Task Force 58 launched the first Allied air strike against the Kure Naval Arsenal. More than 240 aircraft from the aircraft carriers USS Essex (CV-9), USS Intrepid (CV-11), USS Hornet (CV-12), USS Wasp (CV-18), USS Hancock (CV-19), USS Bennington (CV-20), and USS Belleau Wood (CVL-24) attacked Japanese ships in the harbor at Kure. American aircraft strafed I-400, which returned fire with her Type 96 25 mm antiaircraft guns, and one of her gunners was killed.

I-400 visited Moji, Japan, from 5 to 6 April 1945, then returned to Kure. On 14 April 1945, she got underway from Kure with the commander of Submarine Division 1, Captain Tatsunosuke Ariizumi, embarked to make a voyage to Dairen, Manchukuo, to pick up a cargo of fuel oil. She called at Dairen from 20 to 23 April 1945 and loaded 1,700 tons of fuel oil, then headed back to Kure, which she reached on 27 April 1945. While she was at Kure, shipyard workers installed a snorkel aboard her during May 1945.

==== Panama Canal operation ====
By 1 June 1945, all four submarines of Submarine Division 1—I-13, I-14, I-400, and I-401—had been fueled and equipped with snorkels. I-400 got underway from Kure on 2 June 1945 for a voyage via the Shimonoseki Strait, the Tsushima Strait, and the Sea of Japan to Nanao Bay on the western coast of Honshu near Takaoka, Japan. On 5 June 1945, she arrived in Nanao Bay, where all four submarines gathered and were joined by six Aichi M6A1 Seiran ("Clear Sky Storm") aircraft of the Kure-based 631st Naval Air Group, which flew in after a stop at Fukuyama, Japan. On 6 June 1945, the submarines and aircraft began training for night air operations in preparation for a surprise Japanese air strike against the Panama Canal in which the submarines would launch ten M6A1 floatplanes, which were to strike the Gatun Locks from the east with six torpedoes and four bombs, emptying Gatun Lake and blocking the canal to shipping for months. During training, the Japanese demonstrated that four trained men could prepare one of the floatplanes for launch from a submarine in seven minutes and that each submarine could assemble, fuel, arm, and launch all three of the floatplanes it carried in 45 minutes. Despite various obstacles—the presence of mines and U.S. Navy submarines and shortages of aviation gasoline—the submarines and aircraft launched a number of simulated air strikes.

While Submarine Division 1 was still at Nanao Bay, the expected imminent fall of Okinawa to U.S. forces and the increasing pace of air strikes by Allied aircraft carriers on the Japanese Home Islands prompted Japanese Imperial General Headquarters to cancel the Panama Canal strike on 12 June 1945 and decide instead to use the submarines and their floatplanes to strike the Allied fleet anchorage at Ulithi in the Caroline Islands. The submarines and aircraft completed their flight training on 19 June 1945, with all of the M6A1 floatplanes taking off from the waters of Nanao Bay that day. One failed to return, and the bodies of its two crewmen later washed ashore on Sadogashima.

==== Operation Arashi ====
At 13:25 on 25 June 1945, the Combined Fleet issued orders for the attack on Ulithi, dubbed Operation Arashi ("Mountain Storm"). The orders called for I-13 and I-14 to transport Nakajima C6N1 Saiun (Iridiscent Cloud"; Allied reporting name "Myrt") reconnaissance aircraft to Truk in the Caroline Islands in late July 1945. In Operation Hikari ("Shining Light"), the C6N aircraft were to conduct a reconnaissance of Ulithi, noting the presence and location of Allied aircraft carriers and troop transports. I-400 and I-401 then were to launch a combined total of six M6A1 floatplanes—which were to use the reconnaissance information to assist them in targeting Allied ships—on 17 August 1945 for a nighttime strike under a full moon against the Ulithi anchorage, each pilot receiving a hormone injection to improve his night vision and each plane armed with an 800-kilogram (1,764 lb) bomb. After the strike, the aircraft were to land near the submarines, and I-13, I-14, I-400, and I-401 all were to proceed to Singapore, where ten new M6A aircraft would await them for embarkation for another strike.

On 13 July 1945, I-400 departed Nanao Bay bound for Maizuru, Japan, which she reached the same day in company with I-401. She began to load ammunition and three months of provisions. After a farewell ceremony for the aircraft crews on 18 July 1945 at the Shiraito Inn at Maizuru attended by the commander-in-chief of the 6th Fleet, Vice Admiral Tadashige Daigo, I-400 and I-401 got underway for Ōminato in northern Honshu on 20 July 1945, escorted by a minesweeper. After I-400 arrived at Ōminato on 22 July 1945, all crewmen received a day of shore leave, the aircraft had their Japanese markings replaced with American ones, and each submarine brought aboard a model of the Ulithi anchorage as a training aid for the pilots. I-400 departed Ōminato at 14:00 on 23 July 1945, followed by I-401 at 16:00, with Ariizumi embarked aboard the Submarine Division 1 flagship, I-401. The two submarines took separate routes in the Pacific Ocean far to the east of Japan, planning to rendezvous off Ponape in the Caroline Islands on 16 August 1945.

I-400 weathered a typhoon on 28 July 1945. She was east of Saipan in the Mariana Islands on 5 August 1945 when an electrical fire broke out in a control panel on her port side. She surfaced to fight the fire, but her lookouts sighted an American convoy, forcing her to crash-dive. Her crew extinguished the fire while she was submerged, but her interior filled with smoke. To clear the air inside I-400, she rose to place her conning tower above the surface, remaining in this posture for the next five hours while she conducted emergency repairs and vented the smoke out of the interior via open conning tower hatches.

Concerned by high levels of activity by American aircraft and surface ships near the planned rendezvous point, Ariizumi aboard I-401 decided on 14 August 1945 to alter course to the east of the Marshall Islands and meet I-400 at a new location 100 nautical miles (190 km; 120 mi) south of Ponape that evening. He transmitted the new plans in a coded message to I-400, but I-400 never received the message, and missed the rendezvous.

On 15 August 1945, Emperor Hirohito announced that hostilities between Japan and the Allies would end that day. At 21:00 on 18 August 1945, Ariizumi aboard I-401 received orders from the 6th Fleet to cancel the Ulithi attack, and later that day I-400 and I-401 were ordered to proceed to Kure.

==== End of war ====
On 26 August 1945, I-400 received orders to hoist a black flag of surrender and to disarm herself. Accordingly, her crew assembled all three of her M6A1 aircraft and catapulted them unmanned into the sea, dumped their bombs overboard, fired all of her torpedoes, and destroyed all of her logs, charts, codebooks, and secret documents.

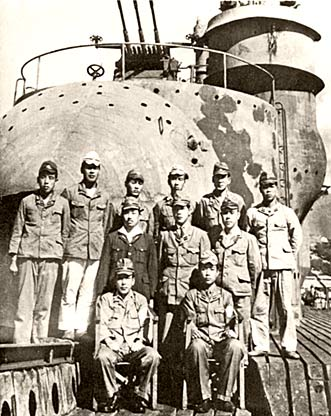
The officers of I-400, photographed in front of her aircraft hangar after her surrender to the U.S. Navy in August 1945.

I-400 was in the Pacific Ocean east of Honshu on 27 August 1945 when an aircraft from U.S. Navy Task Force 38 sighted her at 38°40′N 143°12′E. The destroyers USS Blue (DD-744) and USS Mansfield (DD-728) intercepted her, and she surrendered to them 500 nautical miles (930 km; 580 mi) northeast of Tokyo. The same day, a U.S. Navy prize crew of four officers and 40 enlisted men from the submarine tender USS Proteus (AS-19) set out aboard the destroyer escort USS Weaver (DE-741) to take charge of I-400. Weaver arrived alongside I-400 on 28 August 1945 and put the prize crew aboard her, and I-400 headed for Japan under command of the prize crew, escorted by Blue and Weaver. At 09:15 on 29 August 1945, she arrived in Sagami Bay on the coast of Honshu and moored alongside Proteus′s port side. At 09:55, I-14 also arrived under the command of a U.S. Navy prize crew, and she moored alongside I-400′s port side.

At 08:20 on 30 August 1945, I-400 got underway in company with I-14 and Proteus bound for Tokyo Bay, where they anchored at 14:58 the same day. The United States flag was raised aboard her at 05:00 on 31 August 1945, and at 14:45 I-400, I-14, and Proteus began a move to a new anchorage within the breakwater at the submarine base at Yokosuka, where Proteus was anchored by 16:50. Twelve U.S. Navy submarines chosen to represent the U.S. Navy Submarine Force at the Japanese surrender ceremony in Tokyo Bay also were anchored there, and I-401 arrived on 31 August as well. During the surrender ceremony on 2 September 1945, the Commander, Submarine Force, U.S. Pacific Fleet (COMSUBPAC), Vice Admiral Charles A. Lockwood, ordered his personal flag hoisted aboard I-400 and I-401.

=== Postwar ===
The Japanese struck I-400 from the Navy list on 15 September 1945. On 29 October 1945, I-400 got underway from Yokosuka southbound for Sasebo with a 40-man American crew aboard in company with I-401, I-14, and the submarine rescue vessel USS Greenlet (ASR-10). The ships encountered a heavy storm during their voyage, and the American crews of I-400 and I-401 noted that the I-400-class submarines′ double-hull construction allowed them to ride remarkably smoothly in the heavy seas. The vessels arrived at Sasebo on 1 November 1945.

After loading Japanese motor launches onto their decks to serve as lifeboats, I-400, I-401, and I-14 departed Sasebo on 11 December 1945 under escort by Greenlet bound for Pearl Harbor, Hawaii, stopping along the way at Apra Harbor on Guam in the Mariana Islands from 18 to 21 December 1945, then at Eniwetok in the Marshall Islands, and then at Kwajalein for food and supplies from 26 to 27 December 1945. They arrived at Pearl Harbor on 6 January 1946 and tied up at the Submarine Base, where a U.S. Navy band and local celebrities welcomed them. On 18 February 1946, I-400 entered dry-dock at Pearl Harbor for evaluation.

== Disposal ==
With postwar relations with the Soviet Union deteriorating rapidly and concerns growing in the United States that under postwar agreements the Soviets would demand access to the captured Japanese submarines that would provide the Soviet Navy with valuable information about advanced Japanese submarine designs, the U.S. Navy issued orders on 26 March 1946 to sink all captured Japanese submarines. Accordingly, the U.S. Navy sank I-400 as a target in tests of the Mark 10 Mod 3 exploder off Pearl Harbor on 4 June 1946. She sank by the stern at 12:10 at 21°13′N 158°07′W after the submarine USS Trumpetfish (SS-425) hit her with three Mark 18 Mod 2 torpedoes. COMSUBPAC, Vice Admiral Allan R. McCann, and the commander of Submarine Division 52, Commander Lawson P. Ramage, were embarked on Trumpetfish to observe the sinking of I-400.

== Discovery of wreck ==
On 1 August 2013, the Hawaii Undersea Research Laboratory's (HURL) deep-diving submersible Pisces V located the wreck of I-400 southwest of Oahu, Hawaii, at a depth of 1,826 feet (557 m). What Pisces V initially identified as the bow turned out to be a point 50 feet (15 m) back from the bow, and the hull was completely intact. The wreck showed signs of heavy implosion damage, however, and I-400′s entire superstructure was missing, her conning tower and aircraft hangar apparently having detached from her hull during her final descent to the ocean floor in 1946.

== Bibliography ==
- Sakaida, Henry and Gary Nila, Koji Takaki. I-400: Japan's Secret Aircraft-Carrying Strike Submarine. Hikoki Publications, 2006. ISBN 978-1-902109-45-9
