= I13 =

I13 or I-13 may refer to:

- Dalarna Regiment, a Swedish Army infantry regiment
- Japanese submarine I-13, a submarine of the Japanese Imperial Navy
- Interstate 605, formerly proposed as Interstate 13
- U.S. Route 13 in North Carolina and U.S. Route 17 in North Carolina, formerly proposed as Interstate 13
