= Japanese submarine I-14 =

Imperial Japanese Navy Type I-14 submarine

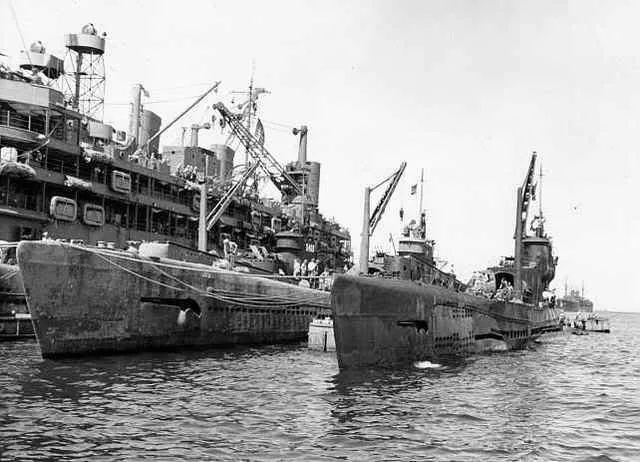
- I-14 (right) beside USS Proteus (far left) and I-401 on 29 August 1945.

History

Imperial Japanese Navy
- Name: Submarine No. 5091
- Builder: Kawasaki, Kobe, Japan
- Laid down: 18 May 1943
- Launched: 14 March 1944
- Commissioned: 14 March 1945
- Fate: Surrendered 27 August 1945; Stricken 15 September 1945; Sunk as target 28 May 1946

General characteristics
- Class & type: Type A Mod.2 submarine
- Displacement: 3,661 tonnes (3,603 long tons) surfaced; 4,838 tonnes (4,762 long tons) submerged
- Length: 113.7 m (373 ft 0 in) overall
- Beam: 11.7 m (38 ft 5 in)
- Draft: 5.9 m (19 ft 4 in)
- Propulsion: Diesel-electric; 1 × diesel engine, 4,400 bhp (3,281 kW); 1 × electric motor, 600 hp (447 kW)
- Speed: 16.75 knots (31.02 km/h; 19.28 mph) surfaced; 5.5 knots (10.2 km/h; 6.3 mph) submerged
- Range: 21,000 nmi (39,000 km; 24,000 mi) at 16 knots (30 km/h; 18 mph) surfaced; 60 nmi (110 km; 69 mi) at 3 knots (5.6 km/h; 3.5 mph) submerged
- Test depth: 100 m (328 ft)
- Crew: 108
- Armament: 6 × bow 533 mm (21 in) torpedo tubes; 1 × 14 cm (5.5 in) deck gun; 2 × triple, 1 × single 25 mm (1 in) Type 96 anti-aircraft guns
- Aircraft carried: 2 × Aichi M6A Seiran floatplanes
- Aviation facilities: 1 × catapult; 1 x hangar

I-14 was an Imperial Japanese Navy Type A Mod.2 submarine that served during World War II. Designed as a submarine aircraft carrier, she was commissioned in March 1945. She surrendered in August 1945 and was sunk as a target in 1946.

== Design and description ==
Previous Type A submarines — both Type A1 and Type A2 — were submarine aircraft carriers capable of carrying a single reconnaissance floatplane and fitted with command facilities so that they could serve as flagships for embarked admirals and their staffs. The Type A Mod.2 submarines were versions of the preceding Type A2, but with the command facilities replaced by an enlarged aircraft hangar fitted for a pair of Aichi M6A1 Seiran ("Clear Sky Storm") floatplane bombers. They displaced 3,661 tonnes (3,603 long tons) surfaced and 4,838 tonnes (4,762 long tons) submerged. The submarines were 113.7 meters (373 ft 0 in) long overall and had a beam of 11.7 meters (38 ft 5 in) and a draft of 5.9 meters (19 ft 4 in). They had a diving depth of 100 meters (328 ft).

For surface running, the submarines were powered by two 2,200-brake-horsepower (1,641 kW) diesel engines, each driving one propeller shaft. When the submarines were submerged, each propeller was driven by a 300-horsepower (224 kW) electric motor. They could reach 16.75 knots (31.0 km/h; 19.3 mph) on the surface and 5.5 knots (10.2 km/h; 6.3 mph) submerged. On the surface, the Type A Mod.2 had a range of 21,000 nautical miles (39,000 km; 24,000 mi) at 16 knots (30 km/h; 18 mph); submerged, they had a range of 60 nmi (110 km; 69 mi) at 3 knots (5.6 km/h; 3.5 mph).

The Type A Mod.2 submarines were armed with six internal bow 53.3 cm (21 in) torpedo tubes and carried a dozen Type 95 torpedoes. They were also armed with a single 140 mm (5.5 in)/40 deck gun and two triple and one single mount for 25 mm (1 in) Type 96 anti-aircraft guns.

The aircraft hangar was enlarged from that of the Type A2 to accommodate two aircraft. It was offset to the right of, and was faired into the base of, the conning tower, which protruded over the left side of the hull. A single aircraft catapult was positioned on the forward deck. Two folding cranes on the forward deck were used to recover the floatplanes.

== Construction and commissioning ==
Built by Kawasaki at Kobe, Japan, I-14 was laid down as Submarine No. 50911, the second Type A Mod.2 submarine and last one to be completed, on 18 May 1943. She was renamed I-14 by the time she was launched on 14 March 1944. She was completed and commissioned on 14 March 1945.

== Service history ==
=== March–June 1945 ===
On the day of her commissioning, I-14 was attached to the Yokosuka Naval District and assigned to Submarine Division 1 in the 6th Fleet along with the submarines I-13, I-400, and I-401. She departed Kobe that day for Kure, Japan, which she reached on 15 March 1945. She was at Kure when the United States Navy′s Task Force 58 launched the first carrier aircraft strike against the Kure Naval Arsenal on 19 March 1945. Although 240 planes from the aircraft carriers USS Essex (CV-9), USS Intrepid (CV-11), USS Hornet (CV-12), USS Wasp (CV-18), USS Hancock (CV-19), USS Bennington (CV-20), and USS Belleau Wood (CVL-24) attacked Kure, she escaped damage.

During March 1945, after the United States Army Air Forces Twentieth Air Force conducted a major fire-bombing raid on Tokyo on the night of 9–10 March 1945, the 6th Fleet proposed to the Imperial Japanese Navy General Staff a retaliatory raid on San Francisco, California, by Aichi M6A1 Seiran floatplanes launched by the submarines of Submarine Division 1, but by April 1945 the General Staff's vice chief, Vice Admiral Jisaburō Ozawa, had rejected the proposal.

By late May 1945, I-14 and the other three submarines of Submarine Division 1 all had been fitted with submarine snorkels. At 08:00 on 27 May 1945, I-13 and I-14 departed Kure and made for Moji on the coast of Kyushu, where they dropped anchor at 19:00 and spent the night. They got back underway on 28 May, passed through the Shimonoseki Strait and Tsushima Strait and crossed the Sea of Japan, arriving the same day at Chinkai in Chōsen (the Japanese name for Korea while under their rule) to refuel. They departed Chinkai on 29 May to return to Japan, stopping at Toyama Bay on the coast of Honshu on 1 June 1945 because of dense fog. I-14 arrived at Nanao Bay on the western coast of Honshu near Takaoka, Japan, on 2 June 1945.

=== Panama Canal operation ===
I-13, I-400, and I-401 soon rendezvoused with I-14 in Nanao Bay, and the submarines were joined by six Aichi M6A1 Seiran ("Clear Sky Storm") aircraft of the Kure-based 631st Naval Air Group, which flew in on 4 June after a stop at Fukuyama, Japan. On 6 June 1945, the submarines and aircraft began training for night air operations in preparation for a surprise Japanese air strike against the Panama Canal in which the submarines would launch ten M6A1 floatplanes which were to strike the Gatun Locks from the east with six torpedoes and four bombs, emptying Gatun Lake and blocking the canal to shipping for months. During training, the Japanese demonstrated that four trained men could prepare one of the floatplanes for launch from a submarine in seven minutes and that each submarine could assemble, fuel, arm, and launch all three of the floatplanes it carried in 45 minutes. Despite various obstacles—the presence of American mines and U.S. Navy submarines and shortages of aviation gasoline—the submarines and aircraft launched a number of simulated air strikes.

While Submarine Division 1 was still at Nanao Bay, the expected imminent fall of Okinawa to U.S. forces as the Battle of Okinawa neared its conclusion and the increasing pace of air strikes by Allied aircraft carriers on the Japanese Home Islands prompted Japanese Imperial General Headquarters to cancel the Panama Canal strike on 12 June 1945 and decide instead to use the submarines and their floatplanes to strike the Allied fleet anchorage at Ulithi in the Caroline Islands. The submarines and aircraft completed their flight training on 19 June 1945, with all of the M6A1 floatplanes taking off from the waters of Nanao Bay that day. One failed to return, and the bodies of its two crewmen later washed ashore on Sadogashima. On 20 June 1945, I-14 got underway for Maizuru, Japan, in company with I-13. They reached Maizuru on 22 June 1945, where I-14 underwent repairs to her propeller bearings.

=== Operation Hikari ===
At 13:25 on 25 June 1945, the Combined Fleet issued orders for the attack on Ulithi, dubbed Operation Arashi ("Mountain Storm"). The orders called for I-13 and I-14 to transport disassembled Nakajima C6N1 Saiun ("Iridiscent Cloud"; Allied reporting name "Myrt") reconnaissance aircraft to Truk Atoll in the Caroline Islands in late July 1945. The C6N aircraft were to be reassembled at Truk and then, in Operation Hikari ("Shining Light"), conduct a reconnaissance of Ulithi, noting the presence and location of Allied aircraft carriers and troop transports. I-400 and I-401 then were to launch a combined total of six M6A1 floatplanes—which were to use the reconnaissance information to assist them in targeting Allied ships—on 17 August 1945 for a nighttime strike under a full moon against the Ulithi anchorage, each pilot receiving a hormone injection to improve his night vision and each plane armed with an 800-kilogram (1,764 lb) bomb. After the strike, the aircraft were to land near the submarines, and I-13, I-14, I-400, and I-401 all were to proceed to Singapore, where ten new M6A aircraft would await them for embarkation for another strike.

On 2 July 1945, I-14 departed Maizuru in company with I-13 and set course for Ōminato on the northern tip of Honshu, where plans called for them to load crated C6N aircraft and proceed to Truk. I-13 reached Ōminato on 4 July, but the problem with I-14′s propeller bearings worsened during the voyage, and she did not arrive until 6 July 1945. She entered drydock at Ōminato for further repairs, and her crew was granted shore leave. By 9 July, Japanese repair crews estimated that I-14′s repairs would require as many as ten more days, so I-13 departed without her with two crated C6Ns aboard on 11 July 1945 bound for Truk; the Japanese never heard from I-13 again, and she was sunk on 16 July during her voyage to Truk.

While I-14 was under repair, U.S. Navy carrier aircraft attacked Ōminato, but she submerged and avoided damage. With her repairs finally complete, she departed Ōminato bound for Truk with two crated C6N aircraft aboard on 17 July 1945. On the day of her departure, Fleet Radio Unit, Melbourne (FRUMEL), an Allied signals intelligence unit at Melbourne, Australia, decrypted a message which informed the Allies that I-14 would depart Ōminato at 15:00 that day bound for Truk and expected to be 165 nautical miles (306 km; 190 mi) bearing 106 degrees from Cape Shiriya at 03:00 on 19 July, at which point she planned to alter course to 110 degrees.

Despite this Allied knowledge of the plans for her voyage, I-14 avoided contact with Allied forces until 30 July 1945, when Allied surface ships detected her in the Pacific Ocean east of the Mariana Islands. Several destroyers began tracking her, forcing her to remain submerged for 35 hours. After her batteries and supply of compressed air both became depleted, she succeeded in raising her snorkel and recharging her batteries without being seen, and she managed to break contact. At 03:30 Japan Standard Time (JST) on 3 August 1945, she detected propeller noises from multiple vessels 150 nautical miles (280 km; 170 mi) northeast of Truk, and shortly afterward she sighted a group of what she identified as U.S. Navy submarine chasers. She reversed course and evaded them. She arrived at Truk at 17:30 JST on 4 August 1945 and unloaded the two C6N aircraft for reassembly ashore. Ordered to return to Japan after unloading the aircraft, I-14 received new orders on 6 August 1945 to proceed to Singapore instead.

I-14 had not yet left Truk when Emperor Hirohito announced on 15 August 1945 that hostilities between Japan and the Allies would end that day. At 21:00 on 18 August 1945, Submarine Division 1's commander, Captain Ariizumi, at sea aboard I-401 to conduct the Ulithi attack, received orders from the 6th Fleet to cancel it, and later that day the 6th Fleet ordered I-14, I-400, and I-401 to jettison all aircraft, torpedoes, other munitions, and documents, hoist the designated black flag of surrender, and proceed on the surface first to Hong Kong and then to Japan. I-14′s commanding officer, Commander Tsuruzo Shimizu, briefly considered proceeding to Singapore rather than Japan after stopping at Hong Kong in the hope of continuing the war, but gave up on the idea because I-14 lacked the fuel for a voyage to Singapore.

=== End of war ===
I-14 departed Truk on 18 August 1945. She was on the surface in the Pacific Ocean east of Honshu at 37°38′N 144°52′E flying the black surrender flag on 27 August 1945 when a plane from U.S. Navy Task Force 38 sighted her and reported her position. Later in the day, she surrendered to the U.S. Navy destroyers USS Murray (DD-576) and USS Dashiell (DD-659) 227 nautical miles (420 km; 261 mi) northeast of Tokyo. A boarding party from Murray went aboard I-14 and accepted the swords of I-14′s officers. Murray then began to escort I-14 toward Sagami Bay on the coast of Honshu. On 28 August 1945, the U.S. Navy destroyer escort USS Bangust (DE-739) rendezvoused with them 450 nautical miles (830 km; 520 mi) east of Nojimazaki and sent a prize crew of U.S. Navy personnel aboard I-14 to take command of her in exchange for forty I-14 personnel, who became prisoners-of-war aboard Bangust. Bangust relieved Murray of escort duty and began to escort I-14 toward Sagami Bay. They arrived at Sagami Bay on 29 August 1945, and at 09:55 I-14 moored there alongside the U.S. Navy submarine tender USS Proteus (AS-19) outboard of I-400, which had already surrendered and tied up alongside Proteus under the command of a prize crew.

At 08:20 on 30 August 1945, I-14 got underway in company with I-400 and Proteus bound for Tokyo Bay, where they anchored at 14:58 the same day. At 14:45 I-400, I-14, and Proteus began a move to a new anchorage within the breakwater at the submarine base at Yokosuka, Japan, where Proteus was anchored by 16:50. Twelve U.S. Navy submarines chosen to represent the U.S. Navy Submarine Force at the Japanese surrender ceremony in Tokyo Bay also were anchored there, and the surrendered I-401 arrived on 31 August as well. The surrender ceremony took place aboard the U.S. Navy battleship USS Missouri (BB-63) in Tokyo Bay on 2 September 1945.

=== Postwar ===
The Japanese removed I-14 from the navy list on 15 September 1945. I-14 departed Yokosuka on 1 November 1945 bound for Sasebo, Japan, in company with I-400 and I-401, also operated by U.S. Navy crews, and escorted by the submarine rescue vessel USS Greenlet (ASR-10). They arrived at Sasebo the same day.

After loading Japanese motor launches onto their decks to serve as lifeboats, I-14, I-400, and I-401 departed Sasebo on 11 December 1945 bound for Pearl Harbor, Hawaii, under escort by Greenlet and manned by U.S. Navy crews, with I-14 under the command of Commander John S. McCain Jr. A few days after departure, the vessels weathered a powerful storm, during which I-14′s crew noted that her hangar, offset to starboard, threw her off balance in heavy seas and created rough riding for the men aboard her. The vessels stopped along the way at Apra Harbor on Guam in the Mariana Islands from 18 to 21 December 1945, then at Eniwetok in the Marshall Islands, and then at Kwajalein for food and supplies from 26 to 27 December 1945. On the final leg of the voyage from Kwajalein Atoll, I-14′s crew experienced the curiosity of celebrating New Year's Eve twice, once on 31 December 1945 west of the International Date Line, then again the following day east of the line, and took advantage of the opportunity to celebrate on both occasions. The three submarines and Greenlet arrived at Pearl Harbor on 6 January 1946 and tied up at the Submarine Base, where a U.S. Navy band and local celebrities welcomed them.

On 16 January 1946, I-14 and I-401 conducted radar tests with the submarine USS Steelhead (SS-280).

== Disposal ==
With postwar relations with the Soviet Union deteriorating rapidly and concerns growing in the United States that under postwar agreements the Soviets would demand access to the captured Japanese submarines that would provide the Soviet Navy with valuable information about advanced Japanese submarine designs, the U.S. Navy issued orders on 26 March 1946 to sink all captured Japanese submarines. Accordingly, the U.S. Navy submarine USS Bugara (SS-331) sank I-14 as a target in tests of the Mark 10 Mod 3 exploder off Pearl Harbor at 21°13′N 158°08′W on 28 May 1946.

== Discovery of wreck ==
On 15 February 2009, the Hawaii Undersea Research Laboratory's (HURL) deep-diving submersibles Pisces IV and Pisces V, working with a group from the National Oceanic and Atmospheric Administration, located I-14′s bow section off Barber's Point, Oahu. Later the same day they found the rest of her wreck, determining that the entire wreck lay at a depth of 800 meters (2,625 ft).

On 17 February 2009, the two submersibles conducted extensive surveys of the wrecks of I-14 and the Japanese submarine I-201, also lying in two pieces in the area after the U.S. Navy sank her as a target in 1946. The survey found that I-14 had broken in two at the forward end of her hangar bay, and that the hangar door was missing, but the hangar itself remained attached to the hull. The hangar's after portion had heavy damage, but aft of the hangar bay the wreck was in "pristine" condition. The conning tower was intact, and "I-14" remained clearly visible, painted on both sides of it. The forward 25 mm (1 in) Type 96 antiaircraft guns had corroded and were aimed nearly vertically in their triple mount. The bow section rested to starboard of the hull and had a mangled end but otherwise was in good condition. A debris field littered with batteries lay on the seabed in between the bow section and the hull. A WildLife Productions film crew was aboard each submersible to record footage during the survey for the National Geographic Channel documentary film Hunt for the Samurai Subs.

Researchers announced the discovery of the wrecks of I-14 and I-201 on 12 November 2009. The search for the wrecks and video footage of them on the ocean bottom was featured in Hunt for the Samurai Subs, which premiered in the United States on the National Geographic Channel on 17 November 2009.

== See also ==
- I-400 class submarine
