= Type A Mod.2 submarine =

Japanese aircraft-carrying cruiser submarines

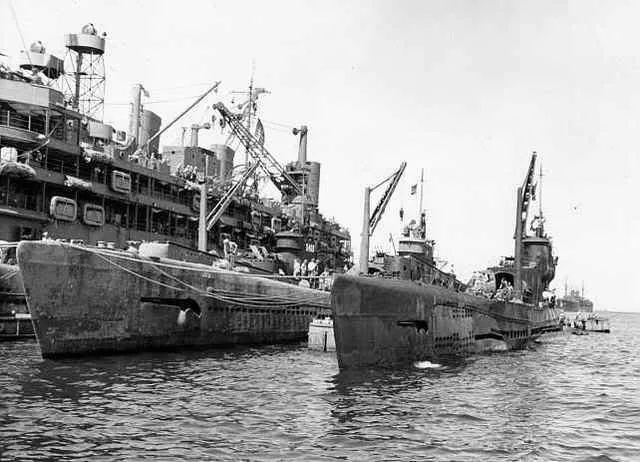
- Japanese submarine I-14 (right) in 1945

Class overview
- Operators: Imperial Japanese Navy
- Preceded by: Type A2 submarine
- In service: 1944–45
- Planned: 7
- Completed: 2
- Cancelled: 5
- Lost: 1
- Scrapped: 1

General characteristics
- Type: Cruiser submarine
- Displacement: 3,661 tonnes (3,603 long tons) surfaced; 4,838 tonnes (4,762 long tons) submerged
- Length: 113.7 m (373 ft 0 in) overall
- Beam: 11.7 m (38 ft 5 in)
- Draft: 5.9 m (19 ft 4 in)
- Installed power: 4,400 bhp (3,300 kW) (diesel); 600 hp (450 kW) (electric motor)
- Propulsion: Diesel-electric; 2 × diesel engine; 2 × electric motor
- Speed: 16.75 knots (31.02 km/h; 19.28 mph) surfaced; 5.5 knots (10.2 km/h; 6.3 mph) submerged
- Range: 21,000 nmi (39,000 km; 24,000 mi) at 16 knots (30 km/h; 18 mph) surfaced; 60 nmi (110 km; 69 mi) at 3 knots (5.6 km/h; 3.5 mph) submerged
- Test depth: 100 m (330 ft)
- Crew: 108
- Armament: 6 × bow 533 mm (21 in) torpedo tubes; 1 × 14 cm (5.5 in) deck gun; 2 × triple, 1 × single 25 mm (1 in) Type 96 anti-aircraft guns
- Aircraft carried: 2 × Aichi M6A Seiran floatplane
- Aviation facilities: 1 × catapult

The Type A Kai 2 (A Modified 2) submarine (巡潜甲型改二潜水艦, Junsen kō-gata kai-ni sensuikan, "Cruiser submarine type A modified 2"), also called I-13-class submarine (伊一三型潜水艦, I-jū-san-gata sensuikan) was a pair of large, aircraft-carrying cruiser submarines built for the Imperial Japanese Navy (IJN) during World War II.

== Design and description ==
The Type A Mod.2 submarines were versions of the preceding A2 class with the command facilities replaced by an enlarged aircraft hangar, which was fitted for a pair of Aichi M6A1 floatplane bombers. They displaced 3,661 tonnes (3,603 long tons) surfaced and 4,838 tonnes (4,762 long tons) submerged. The submarines were 113.7 meters (373 ft 0 in) long, had a beam of 11.7 meters (38 ft 5 in) and a draft of 5.9 meters (19 ft 4 in). They had a diving depth of 100 meters (330 ft).

The machinery was reduced in power from the A2-class boats. For surface running, the boats were powered by two 2,200-brake-horsepower (1,641 kW) diesel engines, each driving one propeller shaft. When submerged each propeller was driven by a 300-horsepower (224 kW) electric motor. They could reach 16.75 knots (31.02 km/h; 19.28 mph) on the surface and 5.5 knots (10.2 km/h; 6.3 mph) underwater. On the surface, the AMs had a range of 21,000 nautical miles (39,000 km; 24,000 mi) at 16 knots (30 km/h; 18 mph); submerged, they had a range of 60 nmi (110 km; 69 mi) at 3 knots (5.6 km/h; 3.5 mph).

The boats were armed with six internal bow 53.3 cm (21.0 in) torpedo tubes and carried a total of a dozen torpedoes. They were also armed with a single 140 mm (5.5 in)/40 deck gun and two triple and one single mount for 25 mm (1 in) Type 96 anti-aircraft guns.

In comparison to the A2 class, the aircraft hangar was enlarged to accommodate two aircraft. It was offset to the right of, and was faired into the base of, the conning tower which protruded over the left side of the hull. A single catapult was positioned on the forward deck. Two folding cranes on the forward deck were used to recover the floatplanes.

=== Name Translation ===
Sources also refer to this class of ships as the "Type AM" (standing for the "Type A Modified"), or "Type AM2" (for "Type A Modified 2"), contrasting with two other sub-classes of the type, the I-9-class (Type A/A1) and I-12-class (Type AM1/A2). As the I-12 submarine was only a minor evolution of the I-9-class as well as being the sole ship of its class, it may also be considered as part of the I-9-class, making the I-13-class the only sub-class of the type, hence the I-9-class "Type A" and the I-13-class of the "Type AM".

"Type AM" might also be a miss-translation of Kai Ni (改二) (equivalent to 2nd remodel/modification) being interpreted as "Mark 2" in the sense of the 1st remodel/modification.

As the original Japanese name (Junsen kō-gata kai-ni sensuikan (巡潜甲型改二潜水艦)) is better translated as either "Type A Mod.2 Submarine Cruiser" or "Junsen Type A Kai 2 Submarine ", the "Type A Mod.2" designation is used here.

== Boats ==
Seven units were ordered, but only two were completed, while construction of two more was abandoned in March 1945. Construction of the remaining three submarines never started.

- I-13 was sunk on 16 July 1945 by the destroyer escort USS Lawrence C. Taylor and aircraft action from escort carrier USS Anzio about 550 nautical miles (1,019 km) east of Yokosuka.
- I-14 surrendered at sea at the end of the war, and was scuttled off Oahu in 1946. In 2009, researchers at the Hawaii Undersea Research Laboratory found I-14 at a depth of about 2,600 feet (790 m).
- I-15 was converted to a tanker submarine in June 1945, 90% complete, scrapped in 1945.
- I-1 was 70% complete, sunk by a typhoon on 18 September 1945; later salvaged and scrapped.
- No.5094, No.5095, and No.5096 were cancelled in 1943.

== See also ==
- I-400 class submarine - 3-aircraft submarine with catapult launcher
- Submarine aircraft carrier
