= Japanese submarine I-13 =

Imperial Japanese Navy I-13 submarine

History

Imperial Japanese Navy
- Name: Submarine No. 621
- Builder: Kawasaki, Kobe, Japan
- Laid down: 4 February 1943
- Renamed: I-13 1 October 1943
- Launched: 30 November 1943
- Commissioned: 16 December 1944
- Fate: Sunk 16 July 1945
- Stricken: 15 September 1945

General characteristics
- Class & type: Type A Mod.2 submarine
- Displacement: 3,661 tonnes (3,603 long tons) surfaced; 4,838 tonnes (4,762 long tons) submerged
- Length: 113.7 m (373 ft 0 in) overall
- Beam: 11.7 m (38 ft 5 in)
- Draft: 5.9 m (19 ft 4 in)
- Propulsion: Diesel-electric; 1 × diesel engine, 4,400 bhp (3,281 kW); 1 × electric motor, 600 hp (447 kW)
- Speed: 16.75 knots (31.02 km/h; 19.28 mph) surfaced; 5.5 knots (10.2 km/h; 6.3 mph) submerged
- Range: 21,000 nmi (39,000 km; 24,000 mi) at 16 knots (30 km/h; 18 mph) surfaced; 60 nmi (110 km; 69 mi) at 3 knots (5.6 km/h; 3.5 mph) submerged
- Test depth: 100 m (328 ft)
- Crew: 108
- Armament: 6 × bow 533 mm (21 in) torpedo tubes; 1 × 14 cm (5.5 in) deck gun; 2 × triple, 1 × single 25 mm (1 in) Type 96 anti-aircraft guns
- Aircraft carried: 2 × Aichi M6A Seiran floatplanes
- Aviation facilities: 1 × catapult; 1 x hangar

I-13 was an Imperial Japanese Navy Type A Mod.2 submarine that served during World War II. Designed as a submarine aircraft carrier, she was commissioned in December 1944 and sunk in July 1945.

== Design and description ==
Previous Type A submarines — both Type A1 and Type A2 — were submarine aircraft carriers capable of carrying a single reconnaissance floatplane and fitted with command facilities so that they could serve as flagships for embarked admirals and their staffs. The Type A Mod.2 submarines were versions of the preceding Type A2, but with the command facilities replaced by an enlarged aircraft hangar fitted for a pair of Aichi M6A1 Seiran ("Clear Sky Storm") floatplane bombers. They displaced 3,661 tonnes (3,603 long tons) surfaced and 4,838 tonnes (4,762 long tons) submerged. The submarines were 113.7 meters (373 ft 0 in) long overall and had a beam of 11.7 meters (38 ft 5 in) and a draft of 5.9 meters (19 ft 4 in). They had a diving depth of 100 meters (328 ft).

For surface running, the submarines were powered by two 2,200-brake-horsepower (1,641 kW) diesel engines, each driving one propeller shaft. When the submarines were submerged, each propeller was driven by a 300-horsepower (224 kW) electric motor. They could reach 16.75 knots (31.0 km/h; 19.3 mph) on the surface and 5.5 knots (10.2 km/h; 6.3 mph) submerged. On the surface, the Type A Mod.2 had a range of 21,000 nautical miles (39,000 km; 24,000 mi) at 16 knots (30 km/h; 18 mph); submerged, they had a range of 60 nmi (110 km; 69 mi) at 3 knots (5.6 km/h; 3.5 mph).

The Type AM submarines were armed with six internal bow 53.3 cm (21 in) torpedo tubes and carried a dozen Type 95 torpedoes. They were also armed with a single 140 mm (5.5 in)/40 deck gun and two triple and one single mount for 25 mm (1 in) Type 96 anti-aircraft guns.

The aircraft hangar was enlarged from that of the Type A2 to accommodate two aircraft. It was offset to the right of, and was faired into the base of, the conning tower, which protruded over the left side of the hull. A single aircraft catapult was positioned on the forward deck. Two folding cranes on the forward deck were used to recover the floatplanes.

== Construction and commissioning ==
Built by Kawasaki at Kobe, Japan, I-13 was laid down as Submarine No. 621, the first Type A Mod.2 submarine, on 4 February 1943. On 1 October 1943 she was renamed I-13 and attached provisionally to the Sasebo Naval District. She was launched on 30 November 1943 and was completed and commissioned on 16 December 1944.

== Service history ==
=== January–June 1945 ===
On the day of her commissioning, I-13 was attached formally to the Sasebo Naval District and assigned to Submarine Division 1 in the 6th Fleet. She departed Kobe that day for Kure, Japan. After an overnight voyage, she arrived at Kure on 17 December 1944 and began basic at-sea training.

I-13 conducted work-ups and combat training with the other submarines of Submarine Squadron 11 — I-400, later joined by I-401 — in the western Seto Inland Sea during January 1945, and on 19 January she also served as an antisubmarine warfare target for the destroyers Kamikaze and Nokaze as they trained their crews. After the United States Army Air Forces Twentieth Air Force conducted a major fire-bombing raid on Tokyo on the night of 9–10 March 1945, the 6th Fleet proposed to the Imperial Japanese Navy General Staff a retaliatory raid on San Francisco, California, by Aichi M6A1 Seiran floatplanes launched by the submarines of Submarine Division 1, but by April 1945 the General Staff's vice chief, Vice Admiral Jisaburō Ozawa, had rejected the proposal.

Meanwhile, I-13 was at Kure when the United States Navy′s Task Force 58 launched the first carrier aircraft strike against the Kure Naval Arsenal on 19 March 1945. Although 240 planes from the aircraft carriers USS Essex, USS Intrepid, USS Hornet, USS Wasp, USS Hancock, USS Bennington, and USS Belleau Wood attacked Kure, I-13 submerged during the attack and managed to escape damage.

By late May 1945, I-13 and the other submarines of Submarine Division 1 (I-14, I-400, and I-401) all had been fitted with submarine snorkels. At 08:00 on 27 May 1945, I-13 and I-14 departed Kure and made for Moji on the coast of Kyushu, where they dropped anchor at 19:00 and spent the night. They got back underway on 28 May, passed through the Shimonoseki Strait and Tsushima Strait and crossed the Sea of Japan, arriving the same day at Chinkai in Chōsen (the Japanese name for Korea while under their rule) to refuel. They departed Chinkai on 29 May to return to Japan, stopping at Toyama Bay on the coast of Honshu on 1 June 1945 because of dense fog. They arrived at Nanao Bay on the western coast of Honshu near Takaoka, Japan. on 3 June 1945.

=== Panama Canal operation ===
I-400 and I-401 soon rendezvoused with I-13 and I-14 in Nanao Bay, and the submarines were joined by six Aichi M6A1 Seiran ("Clear Sky Storm") aircraft of the Kure-based 631st Naval Air Group, which flew in on 4 June after a stop at Fukuyama, Japan. On 6 June 1945, the submarines and aircraft began training for night air operations in preparation for a surprise Japanese air strike against the Panama Canal in which the submarines would launch ten M6A1 floatplanes which were to strike the Gatun Locks from the east with six torpedoes and four bombs, emptying Gatun Lake and blocking the canal to shipping for months. During training, the Japanese demonstrated that four trained men could prepare one of the floatplanes for launch from a submarine in seven minutes and that each submarine could assemble, fuel, arm, and launch all three of the floatplanes it carried in 45 minutes. Despite various obstacles—the presence of American mines and U.S. Navy submarines and shortages of aviation gasoline—the submarines and aircraft launched a number of simulated air strikes.

While Submarine Division 1 was still at Nanao Bay, the expected imminent fall of Okinawa to U.S. forces as the Battle of Okinawa neared its conclusion and the increasing pace of air strikes by Allied aircraft carriers on the Japanese Home Islands prompted Japanese Imperial General Headquarters to cancel the Panama Canal strike on 12 June 1945 and decide instead to use the submarines and their floatplanes to strike the Allied fleet anchorage at Ulithi in the Caroline Islands. The submarines and aircraft completed their flight training on 19 June 1945, with all of the M6A1 floatplanes taking off from the waters of Nanao Bay that day. One failed to return, and the bodies of its two crewmen later washed ashore on Sadogashima. On 20 June 1945, I-13 disembarked her two M6A1 aircraft at Nanao Bay and got in underway for Maizuru, Japan, in company with I-14. They reached Maizuru on 22 June 1945.

=== Operation Hikari ===
At 13:25 on 25 June 1945, the Combined Fleet issued orders for the attack on Ulithi, dubbed Operation Arashi ("Mountain Storm"). The orders called for I-13 and I-14 to transport disassembled Nakajima C6N1 Saiun (Iridiscent Cloud"; Allied reporting name "Myrt") reconnaissance aircraft to Truk Atoll in the Caroline Islands in late July 1945. The C6N aircraft were to be reassembled at Truk and then, in Operation Hikari ("Shining Light"), conduct a reconnaissance of Ulithi, noting the presence and location of Allied aircraft carriers and troop transports. I-400 and I-401 then were to launch a combined total of six M6A1 floatplanes—which were to use the reconnaissance information to assist them in targeting Allied ships—on 17 August 1945 for a nighttime strike under a full moon against the Ulithi anchorage, each pilot receiving a hormone injection to improve his night vision and each plane armed with an 800-kilogram (1,764 lb) bomb. After the strike, the aircraft were to land near the submarines, and I-13, I-14, I-400, and I-401 all were to proceed to Singapore, where ten new M6A aircraft would await them for embarkation for another strike.

On 2 July 1945, I-13 departed Maizuru in company with I-14 and set course for Ōminato on the northern tip of Honshu, which she reached on 4 July 1945. She loaded two crated C6N aircraft there, then got back underway at 15:00 on 11 July to begin Operation Hikari, heading for Truk, where she was scheduled to arrive on 20 July 1945. On the day she left Ōminato, Fleet Radio Unit, Melbourne (FRUMEL), an Allied signals intelligence unit at Melbourne, Australia, decrypted a message from I-13 which gave her intended approximate positions for 12:00 on 13, 15 and 18 July. FRUMEL personnel could not decipher the positions, but incorrectly assessed that Operation Hikari involved the transportation of approximately four kamikaze aircraft to Singapore. The Japanese never heard from I-13 again after her departure from Ōminato.

=== Loss ===
At 07:47 on 16 July 1945, a TBM-3 Avenger aircraft of Composite Squadron 13 (VC-13) from the U.S. Navy escort carrier USS Anzio gained radar contact on a Japanese submarine on the surface in the Pacific Ocean 550 nautical miles (1,020 km; 630 mi) east of Yokosuka, Japan. The Avenger strafed the submarine and attacked her with 5-inch (127 mm) air-to-surface rockets. The submarine submerged, leaving a trail of oil on the surface. The Avenger dropped two depth charges, followed by sonobuoys and a Mark 24 Fido acoustic homing torpedo. Two more VC-13 Avengers from Anzio arrived on the scene and took over the attack, dropping more sonobuoys and another Fido. The Avengers then guided the destroyer escort USS Lawrence C. Taylor to a heavy oil slick that betrayed the submarine′s position. At 11:40, Lawrence C. Taylor fired a barrage of 24 Hedgehog projectiles that sank the submarine — probably I-13 — at 34°28′N 150°55′E.

At 10:33 on 31 July 1945, U.S. Navy signals intelligence decrypted a Japanese message stating that I-13 had not been heard from since she sortied from Ōminato on 11 July, and that her status was unknown. On 1 August 1945, the Imperial Japanese Navy declared her to be presumed lost with all hands in the vicinity of Truk. The Japanese removed her from the navy list on 15 September 1945. The 140 men killed in her sinking represented the largest loss of life aboard a Japanese submarine during World War II.
