= Japanese submarine I-401 =

1st class submarine of the Imperial Japanese Navy

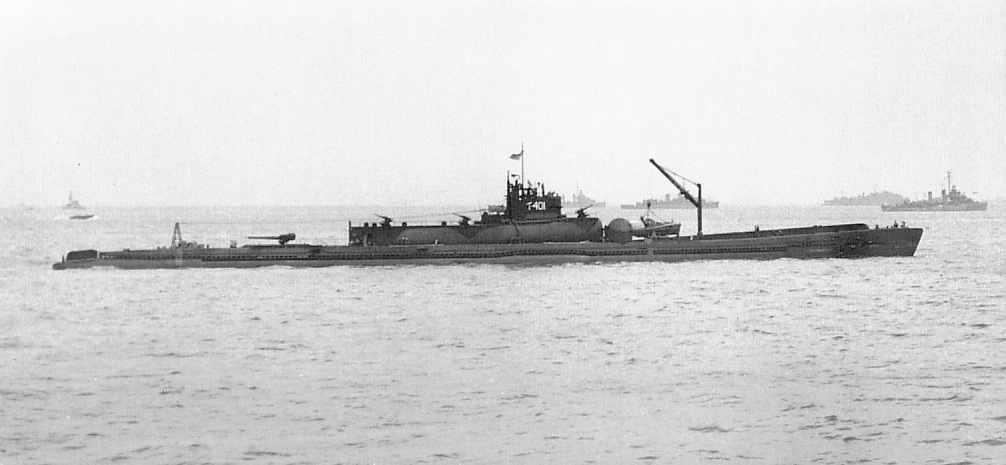
- I-401 in 1945

History

Japan
- Name: I-401
- Builder: Sasebo Naval Arsenal, Sasebo, Japan
- Laid down: 26 April 1943
- Launched: 11 March 1944
- Completed: 8 January 1945
- Commissioned: 8 January 1945
- Stricken: 15 September 1945
- Fate: Surrendered 29 August 1945; Sunk as target 31 May 1946

General characteristics
- Class & type: I-400-class submarine
- Displacement: 5,223 long tons (5,307 t) surfaced; 6,560 long tons (6,665 t) submerged
- Length: 122 m (400 ft)
- Beam: 12 m (39 ft)
- Draft: 7 m (23 ft)
- Propulsion: Diesel-electric; 4 diesel engines, 7,700 hp (5,700 kW); Electric motors, 2,400 hp (1,800 kW)
- Speed: 18.75 knots (21.58 mph; 34.73 km/h) surfaced; 6.5 kn (7.5 mph; 12.0 km/h) submerged
- Range: 37,500 nmi (69,400 km) at 14 kn (16 mph; 26 km/h)
- Test depth: 100 m (330 ft)
- Complement: 144
- Armament: 8 × 533 mm (21 in) forward torpedo tubes; 20 × Type 95 torpedoes; 1 × 14 cm/40 11th Year Type naval gun; 3 × 25 mm triple-mounted Type 96 autocannon (9 barrels total); 1 × single-mounted 25 mm Type 96 autocannon
- Aircraft carried: 3 × Aichi M6A1 Seiran sea-planes

I-401 (伊号第四百一潜水艦, I-gō-dai yon-hyaku-ichi-sensuikan) was an Imperial Japanese Navy Sentoku-type (or I-400-class) submarine commissioned in 1945 for service in World War II. Capable of carrying three two-seat Aichi M6A1 "Seiran" (Mountain Haze) float-equipped torpedo bombers, the Sentoku-class submarines were built to launch a surprise air strike against the Panama Canal. Until 1965, the Sentaku-type submarines — I-401 and her sister ships I-400 and I-402 — were the largest submarines ever commissioned.

== Design and description ==
The I-400-class submarines had four 1,680 kW (2,250 hp) diesel engines and carried enough fuel to circumnavigate the world one-and-a-half times. Measuring 122 m (400 ft) long overall, they displaced 5,900 t (6,504 short tons), more than double their typical American contemporaries. Until the commissioning of the United States Navy ballistic missile submarine USS Benjamin Franklin (SSBN-640) in 1965, the I-400-class were the largest submarines ever commissioned.

The cross-section of the pressure hull had a unique figure-of-eight shape which afforded the strength and stability to support the weight of a large, cylindrical, watertight aircraft hangar, 31 meters (102 ft) long and 3.5 meters (11 ft) in diameter, located approximately amidships on the top deck. The conning tower was offset to port to allow the stowage of three Aichi M6A1 Seiran ("Clear Sky Storm") float-equipped torpedo bombers along the centerline. Aircraft were launched from a 37-meter (120 ft) catapult on the forward deck forward of the hangar. A collapsible crane allowed the submarine to retrieve her floatplanes from the water.

In addition to the three floatplanes, each I-400-class submarine was armed with eight 533-millimeter (21 in) torpedo tubes, all in the bow, with 20 Type 95 torpedoes, a Type 11 140 mm (5.5 in) deck gun aft of the hangar, three waterproofed Type 96 triple-mount antiaircraft guns mounted atop the hangar — one forward and two aft of the conning tower — and a single Type 96 25 mm antiaircraft gun mounted just aft of the bridge.

I-400-class submarines had a rather noisy special trim system that allowed them to loiter submerged and stationary while awaiting the return of their aircraft; demagnetization cables meant to protect against magnetic mines by nullifying the submarine's magnetic field; an air search radar, two air/surface-search radar sets, and a radar warning receiver; and an anechoic coating intended to make detection of the submarine while submerged more difficult by absorbing or diffusing sonar pulses and dampening reverberations from the submarine's internal machinery.

== Construction and commissioning ==
Ordered as Submarine No. 5232, I-401 was laid down on 26 April 1943 by the Sasebo Naval Arsenal at Sasebo, Japan. She was launched on 11 March 1944, and was completed and commissioned on 8 January 1945 with Lieutenant Commander Nobukiyo Nambu in command.

== Service history ==
=== World War II ===
==== January–May 1945 ====
Upon commissioning, I-401 was attached to the Kure Naval District and assigned to Submarine Division 1 — which also included her sister ship I-400 and the submarines I-13 and I-14 — in the 6th Fleet. She also was assigned to Submarine Squadron 11 for workups. The flagship of Submarine Division 1, she got underway from Sasebo on the day of her commissioning to begin workups in the western Seto Inland Sea with I-13 and I-400. She was at Kure, Japan, on 19 March 1945 when the United States Navy's Task Force 58 launched the first Allied air strike against the Kure Naval Arsenal. More than 240 aircraft from the aircraft carriers USS Essex (CV-9), USS Intrepid (CV-11), USS Hornet (CV-12), USS Wasp (CV-18), USS Hancock (CV-19), USS Bennington (CV-20), and USS Belleau Wood (CVL-24) attacked Japanese ships in the harbor at Kure. American aircraft strafed I-401, but she was not damaged.

On 11 April 1945, I-401 put to sea from Kure with the commander of Submarine Division 1, Captain Tatsunosuke Ariizumi, embarked bound for Dairen, Manchukuo, where she was to load fuel oil for transportation back to Japan. I-401 ran aground shortly after leaving port, but freed herself and continued her voyage. On 12 April 1945, however, she detonated a mine laid by a United States Army Air Forces B-29 Superfortress in the Iyo Nada in the Seto Inland Sea 750 meters (820 yd) northeast of the Himeshima lighthouse, bearing 037 degrees from the lighthouse. The explosion damaged some of her instruments and her aft ballast tank valves, forcing her to turn back to Kure for repairs. She underwent repairs during May 1945, and shipyard workers installed a snorkel aboard her while she was under repair.

==== Panama Canal operation ====
By 1 June 1945, all four submarines of Submarine Division 1 had been fueled and equipped with snorkels. They got underway from Kure that day for a voyage via the Shimonoseki Strait, the Tsushima Strait, and the Sea of Japan to Nanao Bay on the western coast of Honshu near Takaoka, Japan. After they arrived in Nanao Bay on 4 June 1945, six Aichi M6A1 Seiran ("Clear Sky Storm") aircraft of the Kure-based 631st Naval Air Group joined them, flying in after a stop at Fukuyama, Japan. On 6 June 1945, the submarines and aircraft began training for night air operations in preparation for a surprise Japanese air strike against the Panama Canal in which the submarines would launch ten M6A1 floatplanes, which were to strike the Gatun Locks from the east with six torpedoes and four bombs, emptying Gatun Lake and blocking the canal to shipping for months. During training, the Japanese demonstrated that four trained men could prepare one of the floatplanes for launch from a submarine in seven minutes and that each submarine could assemble, fuel, arm, and launch all three of the floatplanes it carried in 45 minutes. Despite various obstacles — the presence of mines and U.S. Navy submarines and shortages of aviation gasoline — the submarines and aircraft launched a number of simulated air strikes.

While Submarine Division 1 was still at Nanao Bay, the expected imminent fall of Okinawa to U.S. forces and the increasing pace of air strikes by Allied aircraft carriers on the Japanese Home Islands prompted Japanese Imperial General Headquarters to cancel the Panama Canal strike on 12 June 1945 and decide instead to use the submarines and their floatplanes to strike the Allied fleet anchorage at Ulithi in the Caroline Islands. The submarines and aircraft completed their flight training on 19 June 1945, with all of the M6A1 floatplanes taking off from the waters of Nanao Bay that day. One failed to return, and the bodies of its two crewmen later washed ashore on Sadogashima.

==== Operation Arashi ====
At 13:25 on 25 June 1945, the Combined Fleet issued orders for the attack on Ulithi, dubbed Operation Arashi ("Mountain Storm"). The orders called for I-13 and I-14 to transport Nakajima C6N1 Saiun (Iridiscent Cloud"; Allied reporting name "Myrt") reconnaissance aircraft to Truk in the Caroline Islands in late July 1945. In Operation Hikari ("Shining Light"), the C6N aircraft were to conduct a reconnaissance of Ulithi, noting the presence and location of Allied aircraft carriers and troop transports. I-400 and I-401 then were to launch a combined total of six M6A1 floatplanes — which were to use the reconnaissance information to assist them in targeting Allied ships — on 17 August 1945 for a nighttime strike under a full moon against the Ulithi anchorage, each pilot receiving a hormone injection to improve his night vision and each plane armed with an 800-kilogram (1,764 lb) bomb. After the strike, the aircraft were to land near the submarines, and I-13, I-14, I-400, and I-401 all were to proceed to Singapore, where ten new M6A aircraft would await them for embarkation for another strike.

On 13 July 1945, I-401 departed Nanao Bay bound for Maizuru, Japan, which she reached the same day. She began to load ammunition and three months of provisions. After a farewell ceremony for the aircraft crews on 18 July 1945 at the Shiraito Inn at Maizuru attended by the commander-in-chief of the 6th Fleet, Vice Admiral Tadashige Daigo, I-400 and I-401 got underway for Ōminato in northern Honshu on 20 July 1945, escorted by a minesweeper. I-401 reached at Ōminato on 21 July 1945 and I-400 on 22 July, and after their arrival their crewmen received a day of shore leave, the aircraft had their Japanese markings replaced with American ones, and each submarine brought aboard a model of the Ulithi anchorage as a training aid for the pilots. I-400 departed Ōminato at 14:00 on 23 July 1945, followed by I-401 at 16:00. The two submarines took separate routes in the Pacific Ocean far to the east of Japan, planning to rendezvous off Ponape in the Caroline Islands on 16 August 1945.

Only a little over four hours into her voyage, I-401 was on the surface in Tsugaru Strait at 20:15 on 23 July 1945 when two Imperial Japanese Army coastal artillery batteries on the coast of Hokkaido at Cape Shiokubi mistook her for an Allied submarine and opened fire on her with Type 96 15 cm howitzers. After one of the shells landed only 300 meters (330 yd) off her port quarter, I-401 submerged. After exiting Tsugaru Strait at 06:30 on 24 July 1945, she surfaced, and Ariizumi transmitted a message protesting the coastal artillery bombardment. I-401 weathered a typhoon on 28 and 29 July 1945, and in late July she sighted an unescorted American tanker, but did not attempt to attack it so as to avoid compromising Operation Arashi. On 31 July 1945, I-401 was off Marcus Island when Ariizumi ordered her to remain on the surface and proceed at 19 knots (35 km/h; 22 mph) to make up for lost time and arrive at the rendezvous with I-400 on schedule.

Concerned by high levels of activity by American aircraft and surface ships near the planned rendezvous point, Ariizumi decided on 14 August 1945 to alter course to the east of the Marshall Islands and meet I-400 at a new location 100 nautical miles (190 km; 120 mi) south of Ponape that evening. He transmitted the new plans in a coded message to I-400, but I-400 never received the message, and when I-401 surfaced at the rendezvous point 30 minutes after sunset, I-400 was nowhere to be found. According to contingency plans, if the submarines missed their rendezvous, they were to attempt another meeting south of Ulithi at 03:00 on 17 August 1945 and launch their air strike, so I-401 made for that rendezvous point. Meanwhile, Ariizumi consulted with the 6th Fleet and a consensus was reached to postpone the Ulithi raid until 25 August 1945.

On 15 August 1945, Emperor Hirohito announced that hostilities between Japan and the Allies would end that day. The senior officers aboard I-401 did not view the announcement as credible and decided to continue with the planned attack on Ulithi, and early on the morning of 16 August 1945 I-401 headed for the rendezvous with I-400. When she surfaced after sunset on 18 August 1945, however, she received orders from the 6th Fleet to cancel the attack, and later that day she was ordered to proceed to Kure. Although her crew urged her officers to head for Truk instead and continue fighting, Ariizumi decided that she would proceed to Nanao Bay or Ōminato, after which her crew would scuttle her to avoid surrendering her to the Allies, and she headed for Japan.

==== End of war ====
On 26 August 1945, I-401 received orders to hoist a black flag of surrender and to disarm herself. Accordingly, her crew assembled all three of her M6A1 aircraft and catapulted them unmanned into the sea, dumped their bombs overboard, fired all of her torpedoes, and destroyed all of her logs, charts, codebooks, and secret documents.

I-401 was in the Pacific Ocean off the Sanriku Bight east of Honshu on the night of 28–29 August 1945 when the U.S. Navy submarine USS Segundo (SS-398) detected her on radar, and at around midnight I-401′s lookouts sighted Segundo, which they identified as a suspicious vessel. I-401 worked up to full speed in an attempt to break contact, but her port diesel engine broke down at dawn on 29 August 1945 and Segundo ordered her to stop. Her navigation officer went aboard Segundo, whose crew told him that I-401 must surrender. When Nambu received this information, he contacted Tokyo at 05:00 for instructions and received orders to surrender his submarine. A prize crew from Segundo made up of Segundo′s executive officer and five enlisted men then boarded I-401, and I-401′s crew presented them with a bottle of Suntory whiskey.

After I-401′s hatches were chained open to prevent her from submerging without sinking, Segundo′s prize crew ordered her to proceed to Yokosuka, Japan, with Segundo′s executive officer in command. Ariizumi insisted that I-401 instead make for Ōminato and scuttle herself there, but after Nambu disagreed and obeyed the American orders to head for Yokosuka, Ariizumi committed suicide in his cabin, shooting himself with his pistol while I-401 was in the Philippine Sea off Izu Ōshima on 30 August 1945. I-401′s crew wrapped his body in a flag and dumped it overboard through a hatch without the Americans noticing. Ariizumi had committed war crimes while in command of the submarine I-8 during World War II, and suspicions later arose that I-401′s crew had put Ariizumi ashore near Sendai before she surrendered or that he had swum ashore in Tokyo Bay to avoid prosecution, but these theories were not proven.

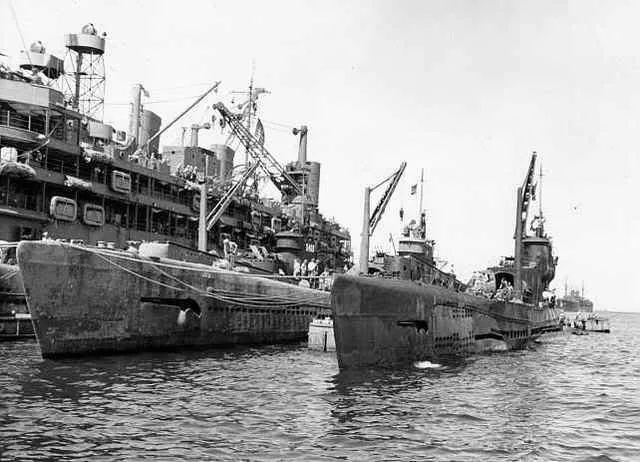
I-401 between the U.S. Navy submarine tender USS Proteus (left) and the Japanese submarine I-14 (right) after the end of hostilities in 1945.

I-401 and Segundo arrived in Sagami Bay on the coast of Honshu at 05:00 on 31 August 1945. The American flag was raised on I-401, and Nambu presented the officer commanding the prize crew with two katana as a symbol of surrender. Later in the day, a new prize crew from the submarine tender USS Proteus (AS-19) came aboard I-401 and relieved the Segundo prize crew, after which I-401 proceeded to Yokosuka and tied up along with I-14 near Proteus and twelve U.S. Navy submarines chosen to represent the U.S. Navy Submarine Force at the Japanese surrender ceremony in Tokyo Bay. At 08:00 on 1 September 1945, I-401′s Imperial Japanese Navy battle flag was lowered, and during the surrender ceremony on 2 September 1945, the Commander, Submarine Force, U.S. Pacific Fleet (COMSUBPAC), Vice Admiral Charles A. Lockwood, ordered his personal flag hoisted aboard I-401.

=== Postwar ===
The Japanese struck I-401 from the Navy list on 15 September 1945. On 29 September 1945, the commander of U.S. Navy Task Force 38, Vice Admiral John H. Towers, inspected her.

On 29 October 1945, I-401 got underway from Yokosuka southbound for Sasebo with a 40-man American crew aboard in company with I-14, I-400, and the submarine rescue vessel USS Greenlet (ASR-10). The ships encountered a heavy storm during their voyage, and the American crews of I-400 and I-401 noted that the I-400-class submarines′ double-hull construction allowed them to ride remarkably smoothly in the heavy seas. The vessels arrived at Sasebo on 1 November 1945.

After loading Japanese motor launches onto their decks to serve as lifeboats, I-400, I-401, and I-14 departed Sasebo on 11 December 1945 under escort by Greenlet bound for Pearl Harbor, Hawaii, stopping along the way at Apra Harbor on Guam in the Mariana Islands from 18 to 21 December 1945, then at Eniwetok in the Marshall Islands, and then at Kwajalein for food and supplies from 26 to 27 December 1945. They arrived at Pearl Harbor on 6 January 1946 and tied up at the Submarine Base, where a U.S. Navy band and local celebrities welcomed them. On 16 January 1946, I-401 conducted exercises with the submarine USS Puffer (SS-268) and I-401 and I-14 conducted radar tests with the submarine USS Steelhead (SS-280).

== Disposal ==
With postwar relations with the Soviet Union deteriorating rapidly and concerns growing in the United States that under postwar agreements the Soviets would demand access to the captured Japanese submarines that would provide the Soviet Navy with valuable information about advanced Japanese submarine designs, the U.S. Navy issued orders on 26 March 1946 to sink all captured Japanese submarines. Accordingly, the U.S. Navy sank I-401 as a target in tests of the Mark 10 Mod 3 exploder off Pearl Harbor on 31 May 1946. She sank by the stern at 10:59 at 21°1′N 158°07′W after the submarine USS Cabezon (SS-334) hit her with two Mark 18 torpedoes.

== Discovery of wreck ==
On 17 March 2005, the Hawaii Undersea Research Laboratory's (HURL) deep-diving submersibles Pisces IV and Pisces V located I-401 off Kalaeloa, Hawaii. I-401 lies at a depth of 820 metres (2,690 ft) off Barbers Point. The submersibles found I-401′s bow broken off just forward of the aircraft hangar and lying not far from the rest of the hull, connected to it by a debris field. The submersibles found the hull sitting upright on the sea floor, and the name I-401 was clearly visible on the sides of the conning tower. I-401′s Type 96 25 mm anti-aircraft guns appeared to be in almost perfect condition.

== Bibliography ==
- Sakaida, Henry and Gary Nila, Koji Takaki. I-400: Japan's Secret Aircraft-Carrying Strike Submarine. Hikoki Publications, 2006. ISBN 978-1-902109-45-9
