= Aichi M6A Seiran =

Imperial Japanese submarine-launched floatplane

M6A Seiran
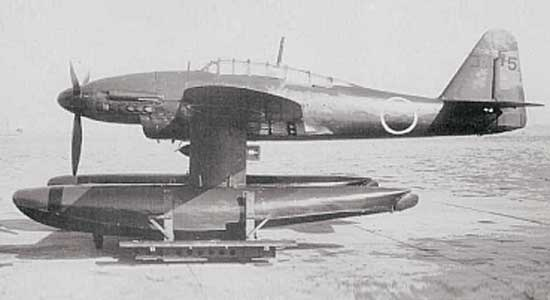
- M6A1

General information
- Type: Submarine-launched dive / torpedo bomber
- Manufacturer: Aichi Kokuki KK
- Primary user: Imperial Japanese Navy Air Service
- Number built: 28 (inc. 2 M6A1-K landplane prototypes)

History
- Manufactured: 1943–1945
- Introduction date: 1945
- First flight: November 1943
- Retired: 1945
- Variant: M6A1-K Nanzan

The Aichi M6A Seiran (晴嵐, Clear Sky Storm) is a submarine-launched attack floatplane designed and produced by the Japanese aircraft manufacturer Aichi Kokuki KK. It was operated solely by the Imperial Japanese Navy (IJN) during World War II. The M6A is the only floatplane to have been designed primarily to perform offensive missions.

The M6A was developed during the early 1940s to be the airborne component of the IJN's envisioned fleet of submarine aircraft carriers, specifically the I-400 class submarine. It was envisioned that submarine-launched M6As would conduct surprise aerial attacks against various Allied targets, including the Panama Canal, American aircraft carriers operating at Ulithi Atoll, and coastal cities on the continental United States. Work on the M6A commenced after it proved untenable to adapt the existing Yokosuka D4Y dive bomber to perform the mission; the aircraft's design, such as its folding wing and foldable tail unit, was shaped by the limited dimensions of the I-400's cylindrical-shaped hangar. The need for a speedy launch process, which was aided by a catapult, also dictated the design of the undercarriage and the atypical technique for starting the aircraft's Aichi AE1P Atsuta 30 V12 engine.

The first prototype M6A was completed in October 1943 and quantity production of the type was authorised in early 1944. In addition to the standard submarine-based M6A, a land-based trainer variant was also evaluated. Production numbers were curtailed in line with cutbacks to the I-400 programme, of which only two operational submarines were completed; the manufacturing effort was also hampered by the 1944 Tōnankai earthquake as well as by American strategic bombing striking Aichi's production facility. While the M6A and the 1st Submarine Flotilla both attained operational status during early 1945, the Surrender of Japan occurred before the first mission, which planned to conduct kamikaze attacks upon American forces at Ulithi, was completed. Accordingly, the M6A did not ever perform the missions that it was intended to perform. A single example has been preserved on static display at the Smithsonian Institution.

== Design and development ==
Starting in the late 1920s, the Imperial Japanese Navy (IJN) had developed a doctrine of operating floatplanes from its submarines to search for targets. In December 1941, Commander-in-Chief of the Japanese Combined Fleet, Admiral Isoroku Yamamoto, proposed constructing a large fleet of submarine aircraft carriers (also designated STo or sen-toku—special submarine) whose purpose was to mount aerial attacks against American coastal cities. These submarines would surface to launch their aircraft by catapult, submerge to avoid detection, then surface again to retrieve the aircrews, who would ditch their aircraft nearby. By June 1942, IJN planners intended to build a fleet of eighteen such submarines. This figure was later cut to nine, then five, and finally just three, as a result of Japan's declining circumstances in the conflict.

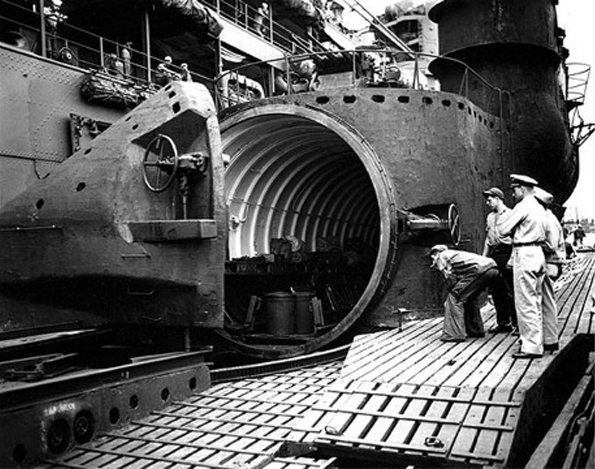
Hangar of an I-400 class submarine, up to three M6A1s could be accommodated

To equip these submarine aircraft carriers, the Imperial Japanese Navy Air Service (IJNAS) approached the aircraft manufacturer Aichi with a request to design a folding attack aircraft with a range of 1,500 km (810 nmi) and a speed of 555 km/h (300 kn). Aichi was already manufacturing under license the Yokosuka D4Y Suisei (Judy), a relatively compact single-engined carrier dive bomber with exceptionally clean lines and capable of high performance. Detailed engineering studies commenced in an effort to modify the D4Y for use aboard the I-400 class submarines, however, the difficulties in doing so were eventually determined to be insurmountable and thus a clean-sheet design was initiated instead.

Aichi's final design, which was internally designated as AM-24 and subsequently assigned the military designation M6A1, was a twin-seat, low-winged monoplane powered by a 1,050 kW (1,410 hp) Aichi AE1P Atsuta 30 engine (a licence-built copy of the Daimler-Benz DB 601 liquid-cooled V12 engine). The original specification dispensed with a traditional undercarriage, however, it was later decided to fit the aircraft with detachable twin floats to increase its versatility. If conditions permitted, these would allow the aircraft to land next to the submarine, be recovered by crane and then re-used. These floats could either be jettisoned in flight to increase performance or left off altogether for one-way missions, although not all aircraft were built with the jettison mechanism.

The wings of the M6A were designed to be rotated 90 degrees and folded hydraulically against the aircraft's fuselage (with the tail also folding down) to permit it to stowed within the submarine's restrictive 3.5 m (11 ft) diameter cylindrical hangar. Armament consisted of a single 850 kg (1,870 lb) torpedo or an equivalent weight in bombs; it was also armed with a single 13 mm (0.51 in) Type 2 machine gun that was mounted on a flexible mounting for use by the observer.

Simplified line drawing of an M6A1 folded for transport.

As finalized, each I-400 class submarine had an enlarged watertight hangar capable of accommodating up to three M6A1s. These aircraft were to be launched from a 26 m (85 ft) catapult (which was powered by compressed air) that was mounted on the forward deck. A well-trained crew of four men could roll a M6A out of its hangar on a collapsible catapult carriage, attach the aircraft's pontoons, and have it readied for flight in approximately seven minutes.

In order to shorten the launching process and eliminate the need for time-consuming engine warm-ups, the M6A was to be catapulted from a cold start. This necessitated heating the engine oil for each aircraft to approximately 60 °C (140 °F) in a separate chamber and pumping it, as well as hot water, through the engine just prior to launch while the aircraft was still inside of the hangar. In this way, the aircraft's engine would be at or near normal operating temperature immediately upon getting airborne. This technique had been previously devised by Nazi Germany, which had planned to use a similar launch method for the aircraft of their unfinished carrier Graf Zeppelin. To aid in the aircraft's assembly under the cover of darkness, fluorescent paint was applied to all critical parts of the airframe.

The first of eight prototype M6As was completed in October 1943, permitting flight testing to commence one month later. In February 1944, the second prototype joined the test program. IJN officials were sufficiently satisfied by the initial test results that it ordered the type into quantity production to commenced before any of the other prototypes were delivered. An early issue identified with overbalance of the auxiliary wings was eventually solved by raising the height of the tail fin. In order to aid pilot conversion to the M6A, two examples of a land-based trainer version fitted with a retractable undercarriage were built; these were given the designation M6A1-K Nanzan (南山, Southern Mountain). Besides the difference in landing gear, the vertical stabilizer's top portion, which was foldable on the standard M6A, was removed.

== Operational history ==
The first production examples of the M6A were completed in October 1944. Deliveries were slowed by an earthquake near Nagoya on 7 December 1944, and by an American air raid on 12 March 1945. Construction of the STo submarines was stopped in March 1945, after two submarine aircraft carriers had been completed and a third was finished as a fuel tanker. These were supplemented by two smaller Type AM submarines, originally designed as command submarines carrying reconnaissance floatplanes, but capable of carrying two M6As. As a consequence of the reduced size of the carrier submarine force, production of the M6A was curtailed at a total of 28 aircraft completed (including the prototypes and the M6A1-Ks).

The new submarines and aircraft were assigned to the 1st Submarine Flotilla, comprising the two STo submarines, the I-400 and the flagship I-401, each carrying three M6As together with two type AMs, the I-13 and I-14. The 1st Submarine Flotilla commenced training with the M6A in January 1945, and the crews gradually learned how to handle both the submarines and aircraft. Launching all three aircraft took longer than expected: 30 minutes if floats were fitted, although this could be reduced to 14.5 minutes if the floats were not used.

The first mission of the sole M6A squadron, which was named the Shinryuu Tokubetsukougeki-tai (神龍特別攻撃隊; meaning "God-Dragon Special Attack Squad") was intended to be a surprise air strike on the Gatun locks of the Panama Canal, to cut the main supply line for US forces in the Pacific. When the force was finally ready to set off on their mission against Panama, Japan's increasingly desperate situation led to a change in plan, resulting in the target for the attack, called Operation Hikari (Splendour), being switched to the American base at Ulithi Atoll where forces were massing in preparation for attacks on the Japanese Home Islands. The flotilla departed Japan on 23 July 1945 and proceeded towards Ulithi with the intention of conducting kamikaze attacks upon the aircraft carriers and troop transports gathered at Ulithi. On 16 August, the flagship I-401 received a radio message from IJN headquarters, informing them of Japan's surrender and ordering the flotilla to stand down and return to Japan. All six aircraft on board the two submarines, having been disguised for the operation as American aircraft in contravention of the Articles of War, were catapulted into the sea with their wings and stabilizers folded (for the I-401) or pushed overboard (for the I-400) to prevent capture.

== Variants ==
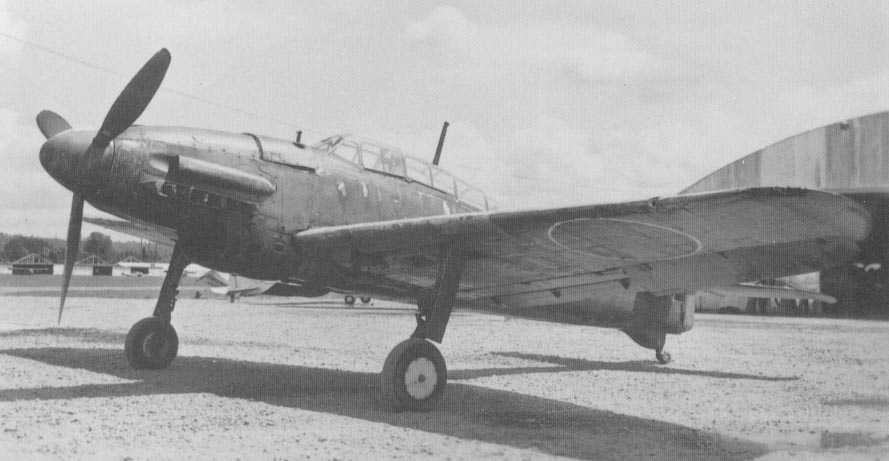
A M6A1-K Nanzan

M6A1
Prototypes powered by Atsuta 30 or 31 1,044 kW (1,400 hp) engine and removable floats, 8 built.
M6A1 Seiran (Shisei-Seiran)
Special Attack Bomber, 18 built.
M6A1-K Nanzan (Shisei-Seiran Kai)
Prototypes of training version, retractable wheeled landing gear, 2 built.
M6A2
Prototype modification, powered by Mitsubishi Kinsei MK8P 62 1,163 kW (1,560 hp) engine, 1 built

== Operators ==
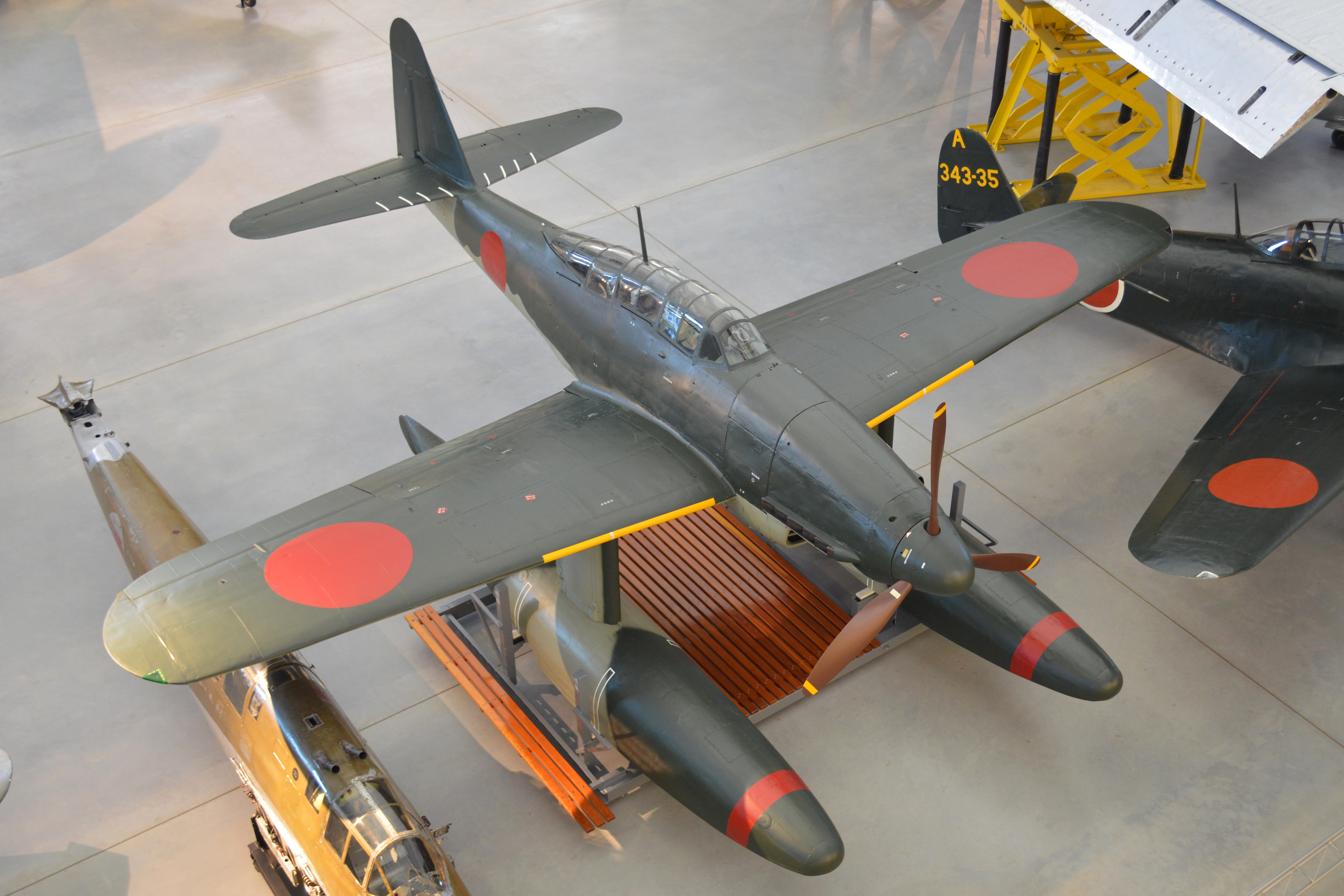
The only surviving Aichi M6A1 Seiran

Japan

- Imperial Japanese Navy Air Service
  - Naval Air Technical Arsenal / 1st Naval Technical Arsenal
  - 631st Naval Air Group

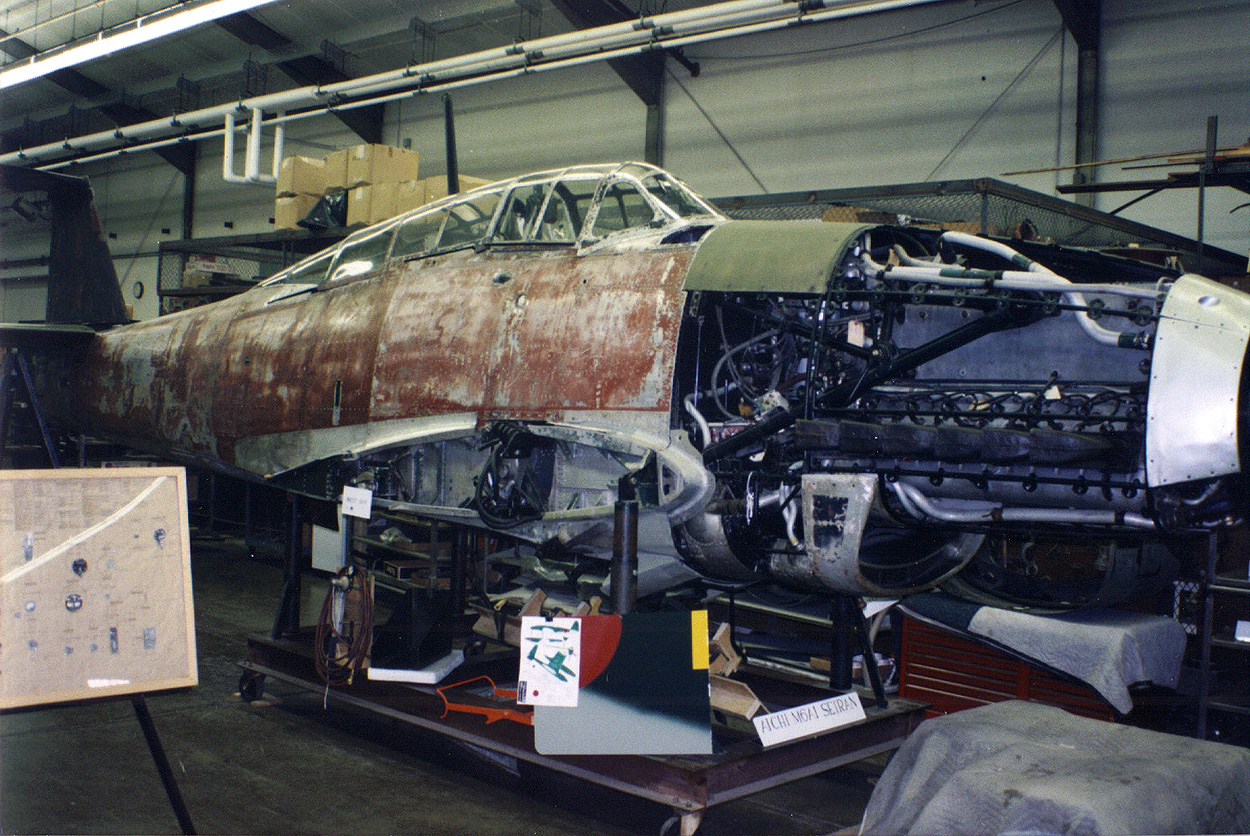
Aichi M6A1 during restoration

== Surviving aircraft ==
A single M6A1 has been preserved and resides in the Udvar-Hazy Center of the Smithsonian's National Air and Space Museum. It is located in the Washington, DC suburb of Chantilly, Virginia near Dulles International Airport. The Seiran was surrendered to an American occupation contingent by Lt. Kazuo Akatsuka of the Imperial Japanese Navy, who ferried it from Fukuyama to Yokosuka. The US Navy donated it to the Smithsonian Institution in November 1962. Restoration work on the Seiran began in June 1989 and was completed in February 2000.

== Specifications (M6A1) ==

Data from Japanese Aircraft of the Pacific War, and Aichi M6A1 Seiran

General characteristics

- Crew: 2
- Length: 11.64 m (38 ft 2 in)
- Wingspan: 12.262 m (40 ft 3 in)
- Height: 4.58 m (15 ft 0 in)
- Wing area: 27 m^{2} (290 sq ft)
- Empty weight: 3,301 kg (7,277 lb)
- Gross weight: 4,040 kg (8,907 lb)
- Max takeoff weight: 4,445 kg (9,800 lb)
- Powerplant: 1 × Aichi AE1P Atsuta 30 or Atsuta 31 V-12 inverted liquid-cooled piston engine, 1,000 kW (1,400 hp) for take-off

1,000 kW (1,340 hp) at 1,700 m (5,600 ft)
960 kW (1,290 hp) at 5,000 m (16,000 ft)

- Propellers: 3-bladed constant-speed propeller

Performance

- Maximum speed: 474 km/h (295 mph, 256 kn) at 5,200 m (17,100 ft)
- Cruise speed: 296 km/h (184 mph, 160 kn) at 3,000 m (9,800 ft)
- Range: 1,188 km (738 mi, 641 nmi)
- Service ceiling: 9,900 m (32,500 ft)
- Time to altitude: 3,000 m (9,800 ft) in five minutes and 48 seconds
- Wing loading: 149.6 kg/m^{2} (30.6 lb/sq ft)
- Power/mass: 0.3574 kW/kg (0.2174 hp/lb)

Armament

- Guns: 1 × 13 mm cabin-mounted Type 2 machine gun
- Bombs:
  - 1 × Type 91 torpedo or
  - 2 × 250 kg (551 lb) or 1 × 850 kg (1,874 lb) bombs

== See also ==
Aircraft of comparable role, configuration, and era

- Arado Ar 231
- Cox-Klemin XS
- Parnall Peto
- Yokosuka E14Y

Related lists

- List of aircraft of World War II
- List of bomber aircraft
- List of military aircraft of Japan
- List of submarine-borne aircraft
