= List of ships of World War II (H) =

The List of ships of the Second World War contains major military vessels of the war, arranged alphabetically and by type. The list includes armed vessels that served during the war and in the immediate aftermath, inclusive of localized ongoing combat operations, garrison surrenders, post-surrender occupation, colony re-occupation, troop and prisoner repatriation, to the end of 1945. For smaller vessels, see also list of World War II ships of less than 1000 tons. Some uncompleted Axis ships are included, out of historic interest. Ships are designated to the country under which they operated for the longest period of the Second World War, regardless of where they were built or previous service history. Submarines show submerged displacement.

Click on headers to sort column alphabetically.

List of ships of World War II (H)
Ship	Country or organization	Class	Type	Displacement (tons)	First commissioned	Fate
H28	Royal Navy	H	submarine	518	29 June 1918	scrapped 18 August 1944
H31	Royal Navy	H	submarine	518	21 February 1919	sunk 24 December 1941
H32	Royal Navy	H	submarine	518	14 May 1919	scrapped 18 October 1944
H33	Royal Navy	H	submarine	518	17 May 1919	scrapped 19 May 1944
H34	Royal Navy	H	submarine	518	10 September 1919	scrapped July 1945
H43	Royal Navy	H	submarine	518	25 November 1919	scrapped November 1944
H44	Royal Navy	H	submarine	518	15 April 1920	scrapped February 1945
H49	Royal Navy	H	submarine	518	25 October 1919	sunk 18 October 1940
H50	Royal Navy	H	submarine	518	3 February 1920	scrapped July 1945
Ha-101	Imperial Japanese Navy	Ha-101	transport submarine	493	22 November 1944	scrapped or scuttled October 1945
Ha-102	Imperial Japanese Navy	Ha-101	transport submarine	493	6 December 1944	scrapped or scuttled October 1945
Ha-103	Imperial Japanese Navy	Ha-101	transport submarine	493	3 February 1945	scuttled 1 April 1946
Ha-104	Imperial Japanese Navy	Ha-101	transport submarine	493	1 December 1944	scuttled October 1945
Ha-105	Imperial Japanese Navy	Ha-101	transport submarine	493	19 February 1945	scuttled 1 April 1946
Ha-106	Imperial Japanese Navy	Ha-101	transport submarine	493	15 December 1944	scuttled 1 April 1946
Ha-107	Imperial Japanese Navy	Ha-101	transport submarine	493	7 February 1945	scuttled 1 April 1946
Ha-108	Imperial Japanese Navy	Ha-101	transport submarine	493	6 May 1945	scuttled 1 April 1946
Ha-109	Imperial Japanese Navy	Ha-101	transport submarine	493	10 March 1945	scuttled 1 April 1946
Ha-111	Imperial Japanese Navy	Ha-101	transport submarine	493	13 July 1945	scuttled 1 April 1946
Ha-201	Imperial Japanese Navy	Ha-201	submarine	440	31 May 1945	scuttled 1 April 1946
Ha-202	Imperial Japanese Navy	Ha-201	submarine	440	31 May 1945	scuttled 1 April 1946
Ha-203	Imperial Japanese Navy	Ha-201	submarine	440	20 June 1945	scuttled 1 April 1946
Ha-204	Imperial Japanese Navy	Ha-201	submarine	440	25 June 1945	wrecked 29 October 1945
Ha-205	Imperial Japanese Navy	Ha-201	submarine	440	3 July 1945	scuttled 9 May 1946
Ha-207	Imperial Japanese Navy	Ha-201	submarine	440	14 August 1945	scuttled 5 April 1946
Ha-208	Imperial Japanese Navy	Ha-201	submarine	440	4 August 1945	scuttled 1 April 1946
Ha-209	Imperial Japanese Navy	Ha-201	submarine	440	4 August 1945	wrecked 18 August 1945
Ha-210	Imperial Japanese Navy	Ha-201	submarine	440	11 August 1945	scuttled 5 April 1946
Ha-216	Imperial Japanese Navy	Ha-201	submarine	440	16 August 1945	scuttled 5 April 1946
Haguro	Imperial Japanese Navy	Myoko	heavy cruiser	13,300	25 April 1929	sunk 16 May 1945
Hai Chao	Republic of China Navy		sloop	1,250		
Hai Chen	Republic of China Navy		gunship	2,680		
Hai Chi	Republic of China Navy		cruiser	4,300		
Hai Chou	Republic of China Navy		gunship	2,680		
Hai Yung	Republic of China Navy		protected cruiser	2,680		
Haida	Royal Canadian Navy	Tribal	destroyer	2,020	30 August 1943	paid off 11 October 1963; museum ship
Halford	United States Navy	Fletcher	destroyer	2,050	10 April 1943	decommissioned 15 May 1946; scrapped 2 April 1970
Halifax	Royal Canadian Navy	Flower	corvette	925	26 November 1941	paid off 12 July 1945
Hallowell	Royal Canadian Navy	River	frigate	1,445	8 August 1944	paid off 7 November 1945
Hambledon	Royal Navy	Hunt	destroyer	1,000	8 June 1940	paid off December 1945, scrapped 1957
Hambleton	United States Navy	Gleaves	destroyer	1,630	22 December 1941	decommissioned 1955, scrapped 1972
Hamilton	Royal Navy; Royal Canadian Navy	Town	destroyer	1,060	23 September 1940	to Canada June 1941
Hammann	United States Navy	Sims	destroyer	1,570	11 August 1939	sunk 6 June 1942
Hancock	United States Navy	Ticonderoga	aircraft carrier	27,100	15 April 1944	30 January 1976
Hansa	Nazi Germany		auxiliary cruiser	9,138	2 February 1944	scrapped 1971
Harder	United States Navy	Gato	submarine	1,525 surfaced	2 December 1942	Sunk 24 August 1944
Harding	United States Navy	Gleaves	destroyer	1,630	25 May 1943	scrapped 1947
Hardy (I)	Royal Navy	H	destroyer	1,455	11 December 1936	beached and capsized under attack 10 April 1940
Hardy (II)	Royal Navy	V	destroyer	1,710	August 1943	sunk 30 January 1944
Harebell	Royal Navy	Flower	corvette	925		
Haruna	Imperial Japanese Navy	Kongō	battlecruiser	31,660		sunk 28 July 1945
Harvester	Royal Navy	Havant	destroyer	1,340	23 May 1940	sunk 11 March 1943
Haste	United States Navy	Flower modified	corvette	1,015	6 April 1943	paid off 3 October 1945
Hasty	Royal Navy	H	destroyer	1,350	11 November 1936	sunk 15 June 1942.
Havant	Royal Navy	Havant	destroyer	1,340	19 December 1939	scuttled 1 June 1940
Havelock	Royal Navy	Havant	destroyer	1,340	10 February 1940	scrapped October 1946
Havock	Royal Navy	H	destroyer	1,350	16 January 1937	ran aground 6 April 1942
Hawkesbury	Royal Canadian Navy	Flower modified	corvette	1,015	14 June 1944	10 July 1945
Haydon	Royal Navy	Hunt	destroyer escort	1,050	24 October 1942	paid off and scrapped 1958
Heartsease	Royal Navy; United States Navy	Flower	corvette	925	4 June 1940	to USA 3 April 1942 as Courage, to UK 23 August 1945
Heather	Royal Navy	Flower	corvette	925	1 November 1940	
Heermann	United States Navy	Fletcher	destroyer	2,050	6 July 1943	transferred to Argentina 1961, scrapped 1982
Hekla	Royal Danish Navy		light cruiser hulk	1,322		
Helena	United States Navy	St. Louis	light cruiser	10,000	18 September 1939	sunk 6 July 1943
Heliotrope	Royal Navy; United States Navy	Flower	corvette	925	12 September 1940	to USA as Surprise 24 March 1942, to UK 26 August 1945
Helm	United States Navy	Bagley	destroyer	1,500	16 October 1937	scrapped 1947
Hemlock	Royal Navy	Flower	corvette	925		
Henley	United States Navy	Bagley	destroyer	1,500	14 August 1937	sunk 3 October 1943
Hepatica	Royal Navy; Royal Canadian Navy	Flower	corvette	925	12 November 1940	to Canada 15 May 1941, paid off 27 June 1945
Hereward	Royal Navy	H	destroyer	1,350	9 December 1936	sunk 29 May 1941
Hermes	Royal Navy		aircraft carrier	10,850	7 July 1923	sunk 9 April 1942
Herndon	United States Navy	Gleaves	destroyer	1,630	20 December 1942	decommissioned 1946, sunk as target 1973
Hero	Royal Navy; Royal Canadian Navy	H	destroyer	1,350	23 October 1936	to Canada 15 November 1943 as Chaudière, paid off 19 March 1946
Hesperus	Royal Navy	Havant	destroyer	1,340	22 January 1940	scrapped November 1946
Heythrop	Royal Navy	Hunt	destroyer escort	1,050		sunk 20 March 1942
Hibiscus	Royal Navy; United States Navy	Flower	corvette	925	21 May 1940	to USA as Spry 2 May 1942, to UK 26 August 1945
Highlander	Royal Navy	Havant	destroyer	1,340	18 March 1940	scrapped May 1946
Highway	Royal Navy	Casa Grande	Dock landing ship	7,930	19 October 1943	scrapped 17 December 1948
Hindustan	Royal Indian Navy	Folkestone	sloop	1,045	10 October 1930	Transferred to Pakistan 1948, renamed Karsaz
Hiei	Imperial Japanese Navy	Kongō	battlecruiser	36,600	1914	sunk 14 November 1942
Hilary P. Jones	United States Navy	Benson	destroyer	1,620	6 September 1940	to Taiwan 1954, scrapped 1974
Hiryū	Imperial Japanese Navy		aircraft carrier	17,300	5 July 1939	sunk 5 June 1942
Hiyō	Imperial Japanese Navy	Hiyō	light carrier	24,140	31 July 1942	sunk 20 June 1944
Hobart	Royal Australian Navy	modified Leander	light cruiser	6,980	28 September 1938	scrapped 1962
Hobby	United States Navy	Benson	destroyer	1,620	18 November 1942	decommissioned 1946, sunk as target 1972
Hobson	United States Navy	Gleaves	destroyer	1,630	22 January 1942	sunk in collision 1952
Hoel	United States Navy	Fletcher	destroyer	2,100	19 July 1943	sunk 25 October 1944, Battle off Samar
Hoggatt Bay	United States Navy	Casablanca	escort carrier	7,800	11 January 1944	decommissioned 20 July 1946, scrapped 1960
Holderness	Royal Navy	Hunt	destroyer escort	1,000	10 August 1940	paid off 1956, scrapped 1956
Hollandia	United States Navy	Casablanca	escort carrier	7,800	1 June 1944	decommissioned 17 January 1947, scrapped 1961
Hollyhock	Royal Navy	Flower	corvette	925	19 November 1940	9 April 1942
Honesty	Royal Navy	Flower modified	corvette	1,015	28 May 1943	scrapped 1961
Honeysuckle	Royal Navy	Flower	corvette	925	14 September 1940	
Honolulu	United States Navy	Brooklyn	light cruiser	9,650	15 June 1938	scrapped 1959
Hood	Royal Navy	Admiral	battlecruiser	42,100	5 March 1920	sunk 24 May 1941
Hornet (I)	United States Navy	Yorktown	aircraft carrier	26,500	25 October 1941	sunk 27 October 1942
Hornet (II)	United States Navy	Essex	aircraft carrier	27,100	29 November 1943	decommissioned 26 June 1970; museum ship
Hōshō	Imperial Japanese Navy		Light carrier	7,470	27 December 1922	scrapped 1947
Hostile	Royal Navy	H	destroyer	1,350	10 September 1936	scuttled 23 August 1940
Hotspur	Royal Navy	H	destroyer	1,350	29 December 1936	to Dominican Republic after war
Hogue	Royal Navy	Battle	destroyer	2,325	24 July 1945	constructive loss 25 August 1962
Houston (I)	United States Navy	Northampton	heavy cruiser	9,200	17 June 1930	sunk 1 March 1942
Houston (II)	United States Navy	Cleveland	light cruiser	11,800	20 December 1943	scrapped 1959
Hova	Free French Naval Forces	Cannon	destroyer escort	1,240	18 March 1944	Decommissioned May 1964
Howe	Royal Navy	King George V	battleship	35,000	28 September 1942	scrapped 1958
Huáscar	Chilean Navy		ironclad	1,870	1866	Museum ship
Hughes	United States Navy	Sims	destroyer	1,570	21 September 1939	scuttled after A-bomb test 1948
Hull	United States Navy	Farragut	destroyer	1,365	11 January 1935	foundered in typhoon 18 December 1944
Humaytá	Brazil	Humaytá	submarine	1,440	20 July 1929	Decommissioned 25 November 1950
Hunter	Royal Navy	H	destroyer	1,350	30 September 1936	sunk 10 April 1940
Huron	Royal Canadian Navy	Tribal	destroyer	1,927	19 July 1943	scrapped 1965
Hurricane	Royal Navy	Havant	destroyer	1,340	21 June 1940	sunk 24 December 1943
Hursley	Royal Navy; Hellenic Navy	Hunt	destroyer	1,050	2 April 1942	to Greece 2 November 1943 as Kriti, scrapped April 1960
Hurworth	Royal Navy	Hunt	destroyer	1,050	5 October 1941	sunk 22 October 1943
Hvidbjørnen	Royal Danish Navy		patrol boat	1,050		
Hyacinth	Royal Navy; Hellenic Navy	Flower	corvette	925	2 October 1940	to Greece as Apostolis 24 October 1943, out of service 1952
Hyatt	Chilean Navy	Serrano	destroyer	1,090		Discarded 1963
Hyderabad	Royal Navy	Flower	corvette	925	23 February 1942	
Hydra	Hellenic Navy	Kountouriotis	destroyer	1,350	1933	sunk 22 April 1941
Hydrangea	Royal Navy	Flower	corvette	925	3 January 1941	
Hyperion	Royal Navy	H	destroyer	1,350	3 December 1936	sunk 22 December 1940
Hyūga	Imperial Japanese Navy	Ise	battleship	36,000	11 April 1913	sunk 27 July 1945
Hyūga Maru	Imperial Japanese Army	M Type A	landing craft carrier		November 1944	sunk
