= Wartime Naval Armaments Supplement Programme =

Wartime Naval Armaments

The Wartime Naval Armaments Supplement Programme (マル戦計画, 昭和十八年度戦時艦艇建造計画, Maru Sen Keikaku, Shōwa-Jūhachi-Nendo Senji Kantei-Kenzō Keikaku) was the 1943-44 War Programme to fund further wartime armaments expansion plans of the Imperial Japanese Navy (IJN).

== Background ==
Due to shifting wartime circumstances, the IJN focused on the construction of auxiliary and escort ships. As a result, the Wartime Naval Armaments Supplement Programme lacked any major warships capable of offensive operations.

== Table of vessels funded under 1944-45 Estimates ==
Category	Class	Vessel number(s)	Completed	Converted	Cancelled
Military transporter 2nd class	No.101	#1501–1569 and 32 vessels	No.101 and 68 vessels	22 vessels were transferred to the Army.	32 vessels
Coast defence boat Type-A (steel) (jp:海防艇)	No.1	#1701–1760			
Minelayer	Kamishima	#1801–1809	Kamishima (#1801), Awashima (#1802)		#1803–1809
Minelayer	Minoo	#1821–1822	Minoo (#1821)		#1822
Coast defence boat Type-B (wood) (jp:海防艇)	No.101	#1851–1870			
Auxiliary subchaser	Aux. No.1	#2001–2100	Aux. No.151 (#2001) to Aux. No.250 (#2100)		
Auxiliary patrol boat	Aux. No.1	#2121–2400	Aux. No.1 (#2121) and 26 vessels		#2125–2144, 2148–2150, 2155–2156, 2159–2173, 2176–2183, 2187–2203, 2207–2209, 2214–2229, 2232–2241, 2244–2252, 2261–2271, 2277–2282, 2287–2292, 2302–2310 and 2314–2400
Escort ship Type-C	No.1	#2401--2532	No.1 (#2401) and 55 vessels		#2446--2447, 2450--2452, 2455--2502, 2505--2506, 2515--2532 and 168 vessels
Escort ship Type-D	No.2	#2701--2843	No.2 (#2701) and 66 vessels		#2735, 2740, 2743--2750, 2754--2755, 2757, 2760--2761, 2764, 2768, 2770, 2773--2774, 2776, 2781--2792, 2794, 2803--2843 and 57 vessels
Military transporter 1st class	No.1	#2901--2922 and 12 vessels	No.1 (#2901) and 20 vessels		12 vessels
Submarine Type-D	I-361	#2961	I-372 (#2961)		
Submarine Type-D	I-373	#2962--2967	I-373 (#2962)		#2963--2967
Submarine Type-D	S60	#2968--2971			#2968--2971
Submarine Type-E	S54-2	#2981--3024 and 48 boats			#2981--3024 and 48 boats
Patrol torpedo boat	PT-151, PT-201, PT-220, PT-235, PT-241, PT-301, PT-327, PT-411, PT-468, PT-469, PT-474, PT-491, PT-538, H-2, H-10, H-27, H-74 and H-101	1540 vessels	approx. 860 vessels		unknown
High-speed submarine (large)	I-201	#4501--4506	I-201 (#4501), I-202 (#4502), I-203 (#4503)		
High-speed submarine (large)	S56B	#4507--4523			#4509--4523
Transport submarine (small)	Ha-101	#4601--4612	Ha-101 (#4601), Ha-102 (#4602), Ha-103 (#4603), Ha-104 (#4604), Ha-105 (#4605), Ha-106 (#4606), Ha-107 (#4607), Ha-108 (#4608), Ha-109 (#4609), Ha-111 (#4611)		#4610 and #4612
Escort ship Type-B	Ukuru	#4701–4721	Inagi (#4701), Habushi (#4702), Ojika (#4703), Kanawa (#4704), Uku (#4705), Takane (#4707), Kuga (#4709), Shiga (#4711), Iō (#4712)		#4706, #4708, #4710 and #4713–#4721
Destroyer Type-D	Matsu	#4801 - 4832	Nire (#4809), Nashi (#4810), Sii (#4811), Enoki (#4812), Odake (#4814), Hatsuume (#4815)		#4801–4808, 4813 and 4816–4832
Fleet oiler	Hario	#4901–4904	Hario (#4901)		#4902–4904
High-speed submarine (small)	Ha-201	#4911–4989	Ha-201 (#4911), Ha-202 (#4912), Ha-203 (#4913), Ha-204 (#4914), Ha-205 (#4915), Ha-207 (#4917), Ha-208 (#4918), Ha-209 (#4919), Ha-210 (#4920), Ha-216 (#4926)		#4916, #4921 - #4925, #4927 - #4989 (of which 11 were launched and 16 more laid down; 42 cancelled before laying down{

== Table of vessels funded under 1945-46 Estimates ==
This programme was projected only, and the vessels were never ordered.

Category	Class	Quantity planned
High-speed submarine (large)	I-201	76 vessels
Submarine Type-D	I-373	140 vessels
Transport submarine (small)	Ha-101	88 vessels
High-speed submarine (small)	Ha-201	10 vessels
Escort ship Type-C	No.1	168 vessels
Escort ship Type-D	No.2	60 vessels

== See also ==
- 1st Naval Armaments Supplement Programme (Maru 1 Keikaku, 1931)
- 2nd Naval Armaments Supplement Programme (Maru 2 Keikaku, 1934)
- 3rd Naval Armaments Supplement Programme (Maru 3 Keikaku, 1937)
- 4th Naval Armaments Supplement Programme (Maru 4 Keikaku, 1939)
- Temporal Naval Armaments Supplement Programme (Maru Rin Keikaku, 1940)
- Rapidly Naval Armaments Supplement Programme (Maru Kyū Keikaku, 1941)
- Additional Naval Armaments Supplement Programme (Maru Tui Keikaku, 1941)
- 5th Naval Armaments Supplement Programme (Maru 5 Keikaku, 1941)
- 6th Naval Armaments Supplement Programme (Maru 6 Keikaku, 1942)
- Modified 5th Naval Armaments Supplement Programme (Kai-Maru 5 Keikaku, 1942)
