= Ha-201 =

Ha-201 may refer to:

- Ha-201-class submarine, a class of Imperial Japanese Navy submarines constructed in 1945
- Japanese submarine Ha-201, an Imperial Japanese Navy submarine commissioned in 1945 and scuttled in 1946
