= Japanese submarine I-402 =

Imperial Japanese Navy Sentoku-type submarine

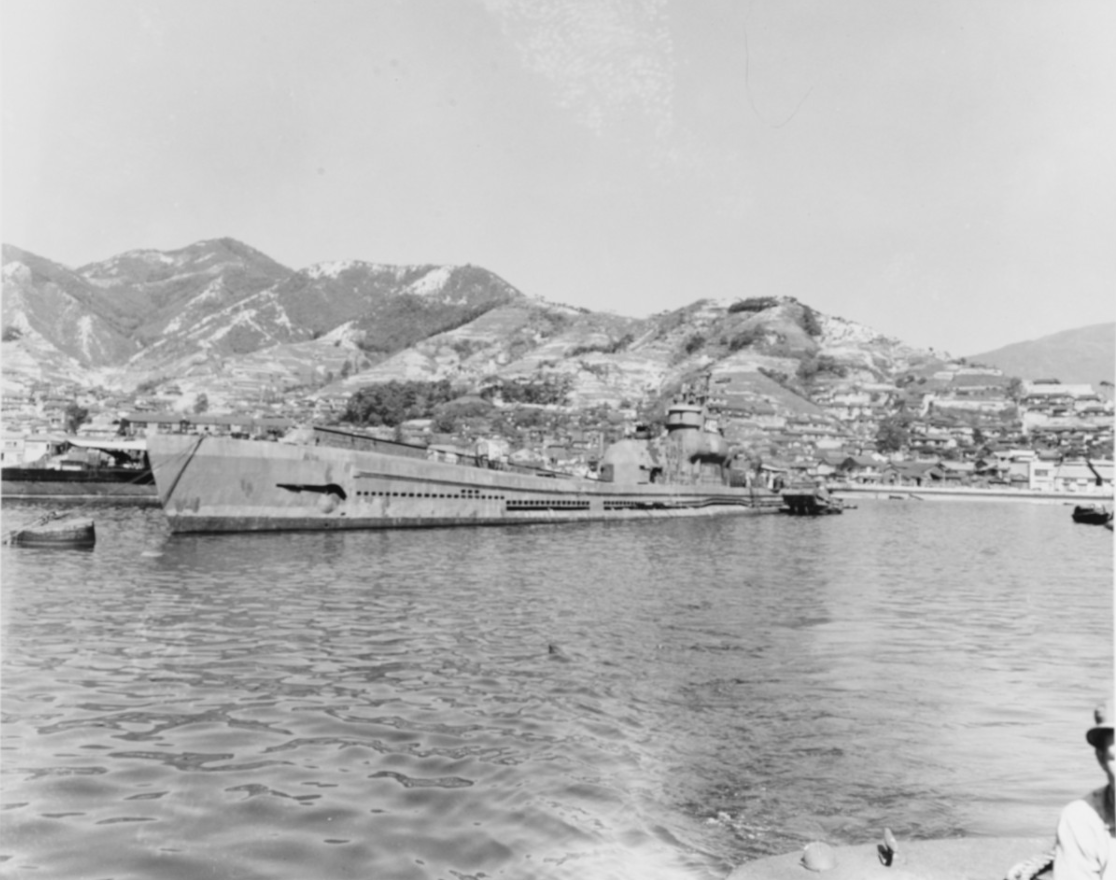
- I-402 at Kure, Japan, on 16 October 1945.

History

Empire of Japan
- Name: I-402
- Builder: Sasebo Naval Arsenal, Sasebo, Japan
- Laid down: 20 October 1943
- Launched: 5 September 1944
- Completed: 24 July 1945
- Commissioned: 24 July 1945
- Fate: Surrendered September 1945; Stricken 30 November 1945; Scuttled 1 April 1946

General characteristics
- Class & type: I-400-class submarine
- Displacement: Surfaced : 5,223 long tons (5,307 t); Submerged : 6,560 long tons (6,670 t)
- Length: 122 m (400 ft)
- Beam: 12.0 m (39.4 ft)
- Draft: 7.0 m (23.0 ft)
- Propulsion: Surfaced : 4 × diesel engines, 7,700 hp (5,742 kW); Submerged : Electric motors, 2,400 hp (1,790 kW)
- Speed: Surfaced : 18.75 knots (34.73 km/h; 21.58 mph); Submerged : 6.5 knots (12.0 km/h; 7.5 mph)
- Range: 37,500 nmi (69,400 km) at 14 kn (26 km/h; 16 mph)
- Test depth: 100 m (330 ft)
- Complement: 144 officers and men
- Armament: 8 × 533 mm (21 in) forward torpedo tubes; 1 × 14 cm/40 11th Year Type naval gun; 3 × 25 mm (1.0 in) 3-barrel Autocannon; 1 × Type 96 25 mm (0.98 in) Autocannon; Up to 20 Type 95 torpedoes

I-402 (伊号第四百二潜水艦, I-gō-dai yon-hyaku-ni-sensuikan) was an Imperial Japanese Navy Sentoku-type (or I-400-class) submarine commissioned in 1945 for service in World War II. Originally intended to be a submarine aircraft carrier like her sister ships I-400 and I-401, she instead was completed as a submarine tanker, but entered service less than a month before the end of the war and never carried out a tanker voyage. She surrendered to the United States at the end of the war in 1945 and was scuttled in 1946. Until 1965, the Sentaku-type submarines were the largest submarines ever commissioned.

== Characteristics ==
The I-400-class submarines had four 1,680 kW (2,250 hp) diesel engines and carried enough fuel to circumnavigate the world one-and-a-half times. Measuring 122 m (400 ft) long overall, they displaced 5,900 t (6,504 short tons), more than double their typical American contemporaries and much larger than the most common Japanese submarine of the era, the Type B1, which was 109 meters (356 ft) feet long and displaced 2,584 tons. Until the commissioning of the United States Navy ballistic missile submarine USS Benjamin Franklin (SSBN-640) in 1965, the I-400-class were the largest submarines ever commissioned.

The cross-section of the pressure hull had a unique figure-of-eight shape which afforded the strength and stability to support the weight of a large aircraft hangar and three floatplanes, with the conning tower offset to port to allow room for them. While I-402 was under construction, however, her aircraft and aircraft facilities were deleted, and she instead was completed as a submarine tanker capable of transporting aviation gasoline from the Japanese-occupied Netherlands East Indies to Japan.

Like other I-400-class submarines, I-402 was armed with eight 533-millimeter (21 in) torpedo tubes, all in the bow, with 20 Type 95 torpedoes, a Type 11 140 mm (5.5 in) deck gun on the after deck of the hangar, three waterproofed Type 96 triple-mount antiaircraft guns mounted atop what would have been the hangar — one forward and two aft of the conning tower — and a single Type 96 25 mm antiaircraft gun mounted just aft of the bridge.

I-400-class submarines had a rather noisy special trim system that allowed them to loiter submerged and stationary while awaiting the return of their aircraft; demagnetization cables meant to protect against magnetic mines by nullifying the submarine's magnetic field; an air search radar, two air/surface-search radar sets, and a radar warning receiver; and an anechoic coating intended to make detection of the submarine while submerged more difficult by absorbing or diffusing sonar pulses and dampening reverberations from the submarine's internal machinery.

== Construction and commissioning ==
Ordered as Submarine No. 5233, I-402 was laid down on 20 October 1943 by the Sasebo Naval Arsenal at Sasebo, Japan. She was launched on 5 September 1944, and was completed and commissioned as a submarine tanker on 24 July 1945

== Service history ==
=== World War II ===
Upon commissioning, I-402 was attached to the Kure Naval District and assigned to Submarine Division 1 — which also included her sister ships I-400 and I-401 and the submarines I-13 and I-14 — in the 6th Fleet. She was in port at Kure, Japan, on 11 August 1945 when Iwo Jima-based United States Army Air Forces P-51D Mustang fighters raided the area after 10:40. She suffered several near misses from bombs, and bomb fragments punctured her main fuel tanks in two places. Two members of her crew were wounded.

Hostilities between Japan and the Allies ended on 15 August 1945 before I-402 could begin her first voyage to the Japanese-occupied Netherlands East Indies for aviation gasoline. She surrendered to the Allies at Kure in September 1945.

=== Post-war ===
Operated by an American crew, I-402 moved from Kure to Sasebo in October 1945. On 30 November 1945, the Japanese struck her from the Navy list.

== Disposal ==
With postwar relations with the Soviet Union deteriorating rapidly and concerns growing in the United States that under postwar agreements the Soviets would demand access to captured Japanese submarines that would provide the Soviet Navy with valuable information about advanced Japanese submarine designs, the U.S. Navy issued orders on 26 March 1946 to sink all captured Japanese submarines. Accordingly, I-402 was among 24 Japanese submarines the U.S. Navy scuttled off the Goto Islands in Operation Road's End on 1 April 1946. After all the other submarines had been sunk that day, I-402 and the submarine Ha-201, lashed together for scuttling, were sunk as gunnery targets by the destroyers USS Everett F. Larson (DD-830) and USS Goodrich (DD-831). The submarines sank together at 16:24 just beyond the 100-fathom (600 ft; 183 m) line 16 nautical miles (30 km; 18 mi) due east of Kinai Island at 32°37′N 129°17′E.

== Later events ==
In 2015, the precise locations of the wrecks of the 24 Japanese submarines scuttled off the Goto Islands, including that of I-402, were confirmed.

== Bibliography ==
- Sakaida, Henry and Gary Nila, Koji Takaki. I-400: Japan's Secret Aircraft-Carrying Strike Submarine. Hikoki Publications, 2006. ISBN 978-1-902109-45-9
