= Japanese submarine Ha-209 =

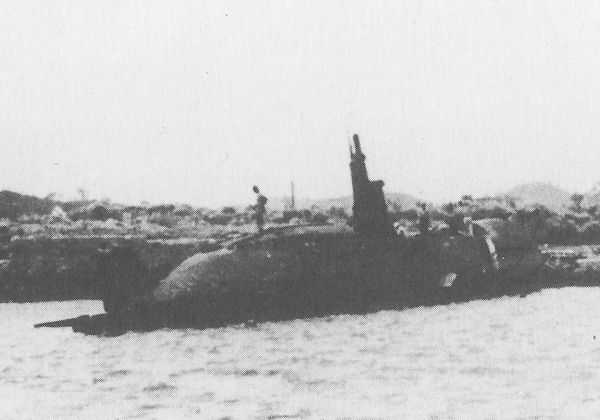
- The wreck of Ha-209 awaiting scrapping at Shimonoseki, Japan, in 1946.

History

Japan
- Name: Ha-209
- Builder: Sasebo Naval Arsenal, Sasebo, Japan
- Laid down: 7 May 1945
- Launched: 31 May 1945
- Completed: 4 August 1945
- Commissioned: 4 August 1945
- Fate: Wrecked 18 August 1945; Stricken 30 November 1945; Salvaged and scrapped August–November 1946

General characteristics
- Type: Submarine
- Displacement: 320 long tons (325 t) surfaced; 440 long tons (447 t) submerged
- Length: 53.00 m (173 ft 11 in) overall
- Beam: 4.00 m (13 ft 1 in)
- Draft: 3.44 m (11 ft 3 in)
- Propulsion: 1 × intermediate diesel; 400 bhp surfaced; 1,250 shp submerged; single shaft
- Speed: 11.8 knots (21.9 km/h) surfaced; 13.9 knots (25.7 km/h) submerged
- Range: 3,000 nmi (5,600 km) at 10 knots (19 km/h) surfaced; 105 nmi (194 km) at 2 knots (3.7 km/h) submerged
- Test depth: 100 m (328 ft)
- Complement: 26
- Armament: 2 × 533 mm (21 in) torpedo tubes; 4 × Type 95 torpedoes; 1 × 7.7 mm machine gun

Ha-209 was an Imperial Japanese Navy Ha-201-class submarine. Completed and commissioned in August 1945 only eleven days before hostilities ended in World War II, and was deliberately run aground by her crew that month.

== Design and description ==
At the end of 1944, the Imperial Japanese Navy decided it needed large numbers of high-speed coastal submarines to defend the Japanese Home Islands against an anticipated Allied invasion (named Operation Downfall by the Allies). To meet this requirement, the Ha-201-class submarines were designed as small, fast submarines incorporating many of the same advanced ideas implemented in the German Type XXI and Type XXIII submarines. They were capable of submerged speeds of almost 14 knots (26 km/h; 16 mph).

The Ha-201 class displaced 325 metric tons (320 long tons) surfaced and 447 metric tons (440 long tons) submerged. The submarines were 53 meters (173 ft 11 in) long, had a beam of 4.00 meters (13 ft 1 in) and a draft of 3.44 meters (11 ft 3 in). For surface running, the submarines were powered by a single 400-brake-horsepower (298 kW) diesel engine that drove one propeller shaft. When submerged the propeller was driven by a 1,250-shaft-horsepower (932 kW) electric motor. They could reach 11.8 knots (21.9 km/h; 13.6 mph) on the surface and 13.9 knots (25.7 km/h; 16.0 mph) submerged. On the surface, the Ha-201-class submarines had a range of 3,000 nautical miles (5,600 km; 3,500 mi) at 10 knots (19 km/h; 12 mph); submerged, they had a range of 105 nmi (194 km; 121 mi) at 2 knots (3.7 km/h; 2.3 mph). Their armament consisted of two 533-millimeter (21 in) torpedo tubes with four torpedoes and a single mount for a 7.7-millimeter machine gun.

== Construction and commissioning ==
Ordered as Submarine No. 4919 and attached provisionally to the Sasebo Naval District on 5 May 1945, Ha-209 was laid down on 7 May 1945 by the Sasebo Naval Arsenal at Sasebo, Japan. She was launched on 31 May 1945 and was completed and commissioned on 4 August 1945.

== Service history ==
Upon commissioning, Ha-209 was attached formally to the Sasebo Naval District and assigned to Submarine Division 52. She departed Sasebo on 11 August 1945 bound for Kure and spent the night of 11–12 August 1945 in Imari Bay on the coast of Kyushu. On the morning of 12 August, she got back underway on the next leg of her voyage, waiting off Mutsure Island while her next anchorage in the Moji Bight was swept for mines.

After spending the night of 12–13 August 1945 at Moji, she resumed her voyage on the morning of 13 August. She was on the surface off Hesaki Lighthouse that day when she detonated an acoustic mine. The explosion blew two of her lookouts overboard, started a fire aft and a minor leak in her main ballast tanks, and brought her to a halt. A minesweeper arrived and towed her to Mitsubishi′s Hikoshima Shipyard at Shimonoseki, where she unloaded the two Type 95 torpedoes she had aboard.

On the morning of 15 August 1945, Ha-209 entered drydock at Hikoshima Shipyard. At 12:00 that day, Emperor Hirohito announced in a radio broadcast that hostilities between Japan and the Allies had ended. On 18 August 1945, Ha-209′s commanding officer requested that she be undocked, and Ha-209′s crew deliberately ran her aground on Ganryū-jima in the Shimonoseki Strait and abandoned her, except for a skeleton crew of nine who remained aboard for a time before also abandoning ship.

== Disposal ==
After a United States Navy inspection team visited Ha-209′s wreck in late September 1945, the U.S. Navy decided to destroy it with explosives. A U.S. Navy demolition team blew it up on 11 November 1945.

The Japanese struck Ha-209 from the Navy list on 30 November 1945. Between August and November 1946, her wreck was salvaged, taken to Hikoshima Shipyard, and scrapped.
