= Japanese submarine Ro-31 =

Kaichu-type submarine

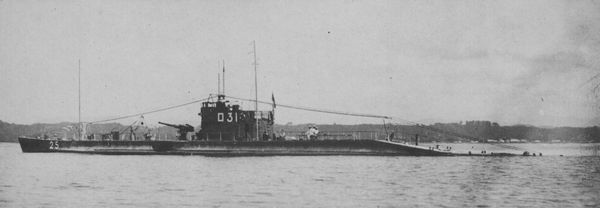
- Ro-31 in 1935.

History

Japan
- Name: Submarine No. 70
- Builder: Kawasaki, Kobe, Japan
- Laid down: 25 September 1921
- Launched: 15 February 1923
- Fate: Sank 21 August 1923; Salvaged and dismantled
- Laid down: 20 December 1924 (rebuild)
- Launched: 25 September 1926 (relaunch)
- Completed: 10 May 1927
- Commissioned: 10 May 1927
- Renamed: Ro-31 on 10 May 1927
- Decommissioned: 15 December 1938
- Recommissioned: 9 February 1942
- Decommissioned: 31 January 1944
- Stricken: 25 May 1945
- Fate: Surrendered 2 September 1945; Scuttled 5 April 1946

General characteristics
- Class & type: Kaichū type submarine (K5 subclass)
- Displacement: 866 tonnes (852 long tons) surfaced; 1,047 tonnes (1,030 long tons) submerged
- Length: 74.22 m (243 ft 6 in) overall
- Beam: 6.12 m (20 ft 1 in)
- Draft: 3.73 m (12 ft 3 in)
- Installed power: 1,200 bhp (890 kW) (diesel); 1,200 hp (890 kW) (electric motor)
- Propulsion: Diesel-electric; 2 × Sulzer Mark I diesel engine, 143 tons fuel; 2 × electric motor
- Speed: 13 knots (24 km/h; 15 mph) surfaced; 8.5 knots (15.7 km/h; 9.8 mph) submerged
- Range: 9,000 nmi (17,000 km; 10,000 mi) at 10 knots (19 km/h; 12 mph) surfaced; 85 nmi (157 km; 98 mi) at 4 knots (7.4 km/h; 4.6 mph) submerged
- Test depth: 45.7 m (150 ft)
- Crew: 44
- Armament: 4 × bow 533 mm (21 in) torpedo tubes; 1 × 120 mm (4.7 in) gun; 1 × 6.5 mm machine gun

Ro-31, originally named Submarine No. 70, was an Imperial Japanese Navy Kaichu-Type submarine of the Kaichu V (Toku Chu) subclass. After a diving accident in 1923 prior to completion, she was salvaged, rebuilt, and completed in 1927. She served in a training role during World War II, surrendered at the end of the war in September 1945, and was scuttled in April 1946.

== Design, description and construction ==
The submarines of the Kaichu V sub-class were designed for anti-shipping operations and carried more fuel and had greater range and a heavier gun armament than preceding Kaichu-type submarines. They displaced 866 tonnes (852 long tons) surfaced and 1,036 tonnes (1,020 long tons) submerged. The submarines were 74.22 meters (243 ft 6 in) long and had a beam of 6.12 meters (20 ft 1 in) and a draft of 3.73 meters (12 ft 3 in). They had a diving depth of 45.7 meters (150 ft).

For surface running, the submarines were powered by two 600-brake-horsepower (447 kW) Sulzer diesel engines, each driving one propeller shaft. When submerged each propeller was driven by a 600-horsepower (447 kW) electric motor. They could reach 13 knots (24 km/h; 15 mph) on the surface and 8.5 knots (15.7 km/h; 9.8 mph) underwater. On the surface, they had a range of 9,000 nautical miles (17,000 km; 10,000 mi) — although the Imperial Japanese Navy officially announced it as 6,000 nautical miles (11,000 km; 6,900 mi) — at 10 knots (19 km/h; 12 mph); submerged, they had a range of 85 nmi (157 km; 98 mi) at 4 knots (7.4 km/h; 4.6 mph).

The submarines were armed with four internal bow 533 mm (21.0 in) torpedo tubes and carried a total of eight torpedoes. They were also armed with a single 120 mm (4.7 in) deck gun and one 6.5 mm machine gun.

Ro-31 was laid down as Submarine No. 70 on 25 September 1921 by Kawasaki at Kobe, Japan, and was launched on 15 February 1923.

== Accident, salvage and commissioning ==
On 21 August 1923, Submarine No. 70 had just completed a pre-completion diving test and submerged sea trial off Kobe when she assumed a 30-degree down-angle by the bow and sank in the Seto Inland Sea 2 nautical miles (3.7 km; 2.3 mi) off Kariya Point on Awaji Island after her crew opened a hatch prematurely, the wake of a passing ship swamped her, and the mismanagement of various valves caused her crew to lose control of her. She sank, killing 88 men — 46 Imperial Japanese Navy personnel and 42 shipyard workers — out of 93 on board. Five men survived the sinking. Her commanding officer was among the survivors, and on 14 March 1924 he was found responsible for the loss of his submarine and fined 100 yen.

Submarine No 70 was refloated on 24 October 1924 and dismantled. She was laid down again on 20 December 1924 to be rebuilt with the materials used in her original construction. She was relaunched on 25 September 1926 and was attached to the Sasebo Naval District the same day. She was completed and commissioned on 10 May 1927 and was renamed Ro-31 that day.

== Service history ==
=== Pre-World War II ===
Upon commissioning, Ro-31 was attached to the Sasebo Naval District, to which she remained attached throughout the pre-World War II period. On 15 November 1934, she was reassigned to Submarine Division 25. She was decommissioned and placed in the Fourth Reserve on 15 December 1938.

=== World War II ===
Ro-31 was still in reserve when the Pacific Campaign of World War II began on 7 December 1941 (8 December 1941 in East Asia) with the Japanese attack on Pearl Harbor, Hawaii. She was recommissioned on 9 February 1942 to serve as a training submarine, initially attached to the Kure Naval District beginning on the day she was recommissioned, then to the Yokosuka Naval District from 14 July 1942 to 15 January 1943, and then to the Kure Naval District again until 15 January 1944, when she again was decommissioned and placed in the Fourth Reserve in the Kure Naval District. The Japanese struck her from the Navy list on 25 May 1945.

== Disposal ==
Ro-31 was on the Japanese coast in the western Seto Inland Sea awaiting disposal when hostilities between Japan and the Allies ended on 15 August 1945. She surrendered to the Allies on 2 September 1945. The United States Navy scuttled her along with the Japanese submarines Ha-207, Ha-210, Ha-215, Ha-216, Ha-217, Ha-219, and Ha-228 off Sasebo Bay on 5 April 1946.
