= Ha-201-class submarine =

Class of small submarines designed for the Imperial Japanese Navy

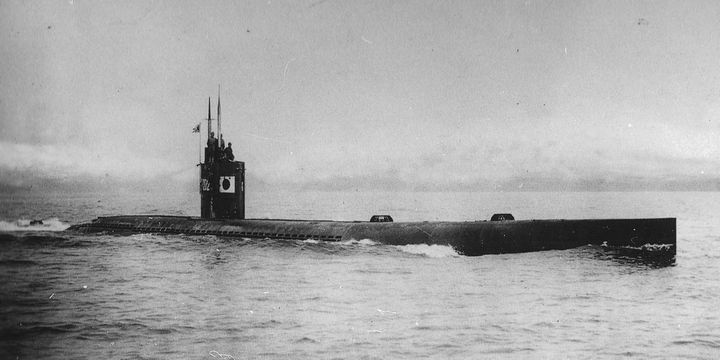
- Ha-202 in 1945

Class overview
- Name: Ha-201 class submarine
- Builders: Sasebo Naval Arsenal; Kawasaki Shipbuilding Corporation; Mitsubishi Heavy Industries
- Operators: Imperial Japanese Navy
- Preceded by: Vessel Number 71
- Built: 1945
- In commission: 1945
- Planned: 79
- Completed: 9 + 1 (after the end of war)
- Retired: 10

General characteristics
- Type: Submarine
- Displacement: 320 long tons (325 t) surfaced; 440 long tons (447 t) submerged
- Length: 53.00 m (173 ft 11 in) overall
- Beam: 4.00 m (13 ft 1 in)
- Draft: 3.44 m (11 ft 3 in)
- Propulsion: 1 × intermediate diesel; 400 bhp surfaced; 1,250 shp submerged; single shaft
- Speed: 11.8 knots (21.9 km/h) surfaced; 13.9 knots (25.7 km/h) submerged
- Range: 3,000 nmi (5,600 km) at 10 knots (19 km/h) surfaced; 105 nmi (194 km) at 2 knots (3.7 km/h) submerged
- Test depth: 100 m (330 ft)
- Complement: 26
- Armament: 2 × 533 mm (21 in) torpedo tubes; 4 × Type 95 torpedoes; 1 × 7.7 mm machine gun

The Ha-201-class submarine (波二百一型潜水艦, Ha-ni-hyaku-ichi-gata sensuikan) were a class of small submarines designed for the Imperial Japanese Navy (IJN). They were first deployed in 1945, but never saw combat. The Ha-201's were designed from the outset to have high underwater speed and were based on the earlier Submarine No.71 prototype. The official designation of the submarine was Sentaka-Shō type submarine (潜高小型潜水艦, Sen-Taka-Ko-gata sensuikan, "Submarine High speed-Small type"). The type name was shortened to Suichū Kōsoku Sensuikan Ko-gata (水中高速潜水艦小型, Underwater High speed Submarine Small type).

== Design and description ==
At the end of 1944, the Imperial Japanese Navy decided it needed large numbers of high-speed coastal submarines to defend the Japanese Home Islands against an anticipated Allied invasion (named Operation Downfall by the Allies). To meet this requirement, the Ha-201-class submarines were designed as small, fast submarines incorporating many of the same advanced ideas implemented in the German Type XXI and Type XXIII submarines. They were capable of submerged speeds of almost 14 knots (26 km/h; 16 mph).

The Ha-201 class displaced 325 metric tons (320 long tons) surfaced and 447 metric tons (440 long tons) submerged. The submarines were 53 meters (173 ft 11 in) long, had a beam of 4.00 meters (13 ft 1 in) and a draft of 3.44 meters (11 ft 3 in). For surface running, the submarines were powered by a single 400-brake-horsepower (298 kW) diesel engine that drove one propeller shaft. When submerged the propeller was driven by a 1,250-shaft-horsepower (932 kW) electric motor. They could reach 11.8 knots (21.9 km/h; 13.6 mph) on the surface and 13.9 knots (25.7 km/h; 16.0 mph) submerged. On the surface, the Ha-201-class submarines had a range of 3,000 nautical miles (5,600 km; 3,500 mi) at 10 knots (19 km/h; 12 mph); submerged, they had a range of 105 nmi (194 km; 121 mi) at 2 knots (3.7 km/h; 2.3 mph). Their armament consisted of two 533-millimeter (21 in) torpedo tubes with four torpedoes and a single mount for a 7.7-millimeter machine gun.

== Construction ==
The Japanese planned to build 79 Ha-201-class submarines (Submarines No. 4911 through 4989) under the Maru Sen Programme, prefabricating large sections of the boats, then completing them on the slipway. This was an ambitious goal considering the U.S. bombing campaign, which disrupted Japanese production, and by the time hostilities ceased on 15 August 1945 the Japanese had laid down only 22 submarines and completed only ten.

== Service ==
None of the submarines made operational patrols. Except for one submarine that was wrecked, the Allies after the war scuttled all the submarines that had been completed as well as all the incomplete ones that had been launched. Those which remained on the building ways at the end of the war were scrapped incomplete.

== Boats ==
Boat #	Name	Builder	Laid down	Launched	Completed	Fate
4911	Ha-201	Sasebo Naval Arsenal	01-03-1945	23-04-1945	31-05-1945	Decommissioned 30-11-1945. Scuttled off Gotō Islands 01-04-1946.
4912	Ha-202	Sasebo Naval Arsenal	01-03-1945	23-04-1945	31-05-1945	Decommissioned 30-11-1945. Scuttled off Gotō Islands 01-04-1946.
4913	Ha-203	Sasebo Naval Arsenal	05-04-1945	25-05-1945	26-06-1945	Decommissioned 30-11-1945. Scuttled off Gotō Islands 01-04-1946.
4914	Ha-204	Sasebo Naval Arsenal	05-04-1945	01-06-1945	25-06-1945	Decommissioned 30-11-1945. Grounded at Aburatsu Bay, October 1946. Salvaged and scrapped August 1948.
4915	Ha-205	Sasebo Naval Arsenal	17-04-1945	14-05-1945	03-07-1945	Decommissioned 30-11-1945. Scuttled at Iyo Nada, May 1946.
4916	Ha-206	Kawasaki-Senshū Shipyard	19-03-1945	10-07-1945		Incomplete at end of war (95%), sunk by typhoon 25-08-1945. Salvaged and scuttled at Kii Channel 06-05-1946.
4917	Ha-207	Sasebo Naval Arsenal	23-04-1945	26-05-1945	14-08-1945	Decommissioned 30-11-1945. Scuttled off Sasebo 05-04-1946.
4918	Ha-208	Sasebo Naval Arsenal	01-05-1945	26-05-1945	04-08-1945	Decommissioned 30-11-1945. Scuttled off Gotō Islands 01-04-1946.
4919	Ha-209	Sasebo Naval Arsenal	07-05-1945	31-05-1945	04-08-1945	Decommissioned 30-11-1945. Scrapped August 1946.
4920	Ha-210	Sasebo Naval Arsenal	14-05-1945	10-06-1945	11-08-1945	Decommissioned 30-11-1945. Scuttled off Sasebo 05-04-1946.
4921	Ha-211	Kawasaki-Senshū Shipyard	01-04-1945	April 1946		Incomplete at end of war (40%). Scuttled at Kii Channel 06-05-1946.
4922	Ha-212	Kawasaki-Kōbe Shipyard	10-04-1945	25-06-1945		Incomplete at end of war (95%). Scuttled at Kii Channel, May 1946.
4923	Ha-213	Mitsubishi-Kōbe Shipyard	15-05-1945	29-07-1945		Incomplete at end of war (93%). Scuttled at Kii Channel 06-05-1946.
4924	Ha-214	Mitsubishi-Kōbe Shipyard	15-05-1945	15-08-1945		Incomplete at end of war (75%). Scuttled at Kii Channel 06-05-1946.
4925	Ha-215	Sasebo Naval Arsenal	22-05-1945	15-05-1945		Incomplete at end of war (95%). Scuttled off Sasebo 05-04-1946.
4926	Ha-216	Sasebo Naval Arsenal	27-05-1945	19-06-1945	16-08-1945	Decommissioned 30-11-1945. Scuttled off Sasebo 05-04-1946.
4927	Ha-217	Sasebo Naval Arsenal	02-06-1945	26-06-1945		Incomplete at end of war (90%). Scuttled off Sasebo 05-04-1946.
4928	Ha-218	Sasebo Naval Arsenal	08-06-1945	02-07-1945		Incomplete at end of war (90%). Scrapped, December 1946.
4929	Ha-219	Sasebo Naval Arsenal	15-06-1945	12-07-1945		Incomplete at end of war (90%). Scuttled off Sasebo 05-04-1946.
4930	Ha-220	Kawasaki-Senshū Shipyard	10-05-1945			Incomplete at end of war (20%). Scrapped, June 1946.
4931	Ha-221	Mitsubishi-Kōbe Shipyard	20-04-1945	04-08-1945		Incomplete at end of war (85%). Scuttled at Kii Channel, 06-05-1946.
4932	Ha-222	Kawasaki-Senshū Shipyard	15-05-1945			Incomplete at end of war (15%). Scrapped, June 1946.
4933	Ha-223	Kawasaki-Kōbe Shipyard	01-05-1945			Incomplete at end of war (60%). Scrapped, June 1946.
4934	Ha-224	Mitsubishi-Kōbe Shipyard	07-06-1945			Incomplete at end of war (55%). Scrapped, June 1946.
4935	Ha-225	Mitsubishi-Kōbe Shipyard	07-06-1945			Incomplete at end of war (45%). Scrapped, June 1946.
4936	Ha-226	Mitsubishi-Kōbe Shipyard	16-06-1945			Incomplete at end of war (35%). Scrapped, June 1946.
4937	Ha-227	Mitsubishi-Kōbe Shipyard	10-07-1945			Incomplete at end of war (25%). Scrapped, June 1946.
4938	Ha-228	Sasebo Naval Arsenal	21-06-1945	18-07-1945		Incomplete at end of war (75%). Scuttled off Sasebo 05-04-1946.
4939	Ha-229	Sasebo Naval Arsenal	27-06-1945	27-07-1945		Incomplete at end of war (75%). Scrapped, December 1946.
4940	Ha-230	Sasebo Naval Arsenal	03-07-1945			Incomplete at end of war (60%). Scrapped, December 1946.
4941	Ha-231	Sasebo Naval Arsenal	12-07-1945			Incomplete at end of war (50%). Later scrapped.
4942	Ha-232	Sasebo Naval Arsenal	18-07-1945			Incomplete at end of war (40%). Later scrapped.
4943	Ha-233	Kawasaki-Senshū Shipyard	01-06-1945			Incomplete at end of war (10%). Later scrapped.
4944	Ha-234	Kawasaki-Kōbe Shipyard	15-05-1945			Incomplete at end of war (50%). Scrapped, June 1946.
4945	Ha-235	Kawasaki-Senshū Shipyard	01-06-1945			Incomplete at end of war (10%). Later scrapped.
4946	Ha-236	Kawasaki-Kōbe Shipyard	01-06-1945			Incomplete at end of war (40%). Scrapped, June 1946.
4947	Ha-237	Mitsubishi-Kōbe Shipyard	10-07-1945			Incomplete at end of war (25%). Scrapped, June 1946.
4948	Ha-238	Mitsubishi-Kōbe Shipyard	01-08-1945			Incomplete at end of war (15%). Scrapped, June 1946.
4949	Ha-239	Mitsubishi-Kōbe Shipyard	01-08-1945			Incomplete at end of war. Scrapped, June 1946.
4950	Ha-240	Mitsubishi-Kōbe Shipyard	01-08-1945			Incomplete at end of war. Scrapped, June 1946.
4951 - 4955						Construction not started by end of war.
4956	Ha-246	Kawasaki-Senshū Shipyard	13-07-1945			Incomplete ay end of war (5%). Later scrapped.
4957	Ha-247	Kawasaki-Kōbe Shipyard	26-06-1945			Incomplete at end of war. Later scrapped.
4958 - 4989						Construction not started by end of war.

== See also ==
Comparable submarines

- German Type XXIII submarine
- I-201 class submarine
- Vessel Number 71
- Kairyū-class submarine

== Bibliography ==
- "Rekishi Gunzō"., History of Pacific War Vol.17 I-Gō Submarines, Gakken (Japan), January 1998, ISBN 4-05-601767-0
- Rekishi Gunzō, History of Pacific War Extra, "Perfect guide, The submarines of the Imperial Japanese Forces", Gakken (Japan), March 2005, ISBN 4-05-603890-2
- The Maru Special, Japanese Naval Vessels No.43 Japanese Submarines III, Ushio Shobō (Japan), September 1980, Book code 68343-43
- The Maru Special, Japanese Naval Vessels No.132 Japanese Submarines I "Revised edition", Ushio Shobō (Japan), February 1988, Book code 68344-36
- Ships of the World special issue Vol.37, History of Japanese Submarines, "Kaijinsha"., (Japan), August 1993
