= Japanese fleet oiler Kazahaya =

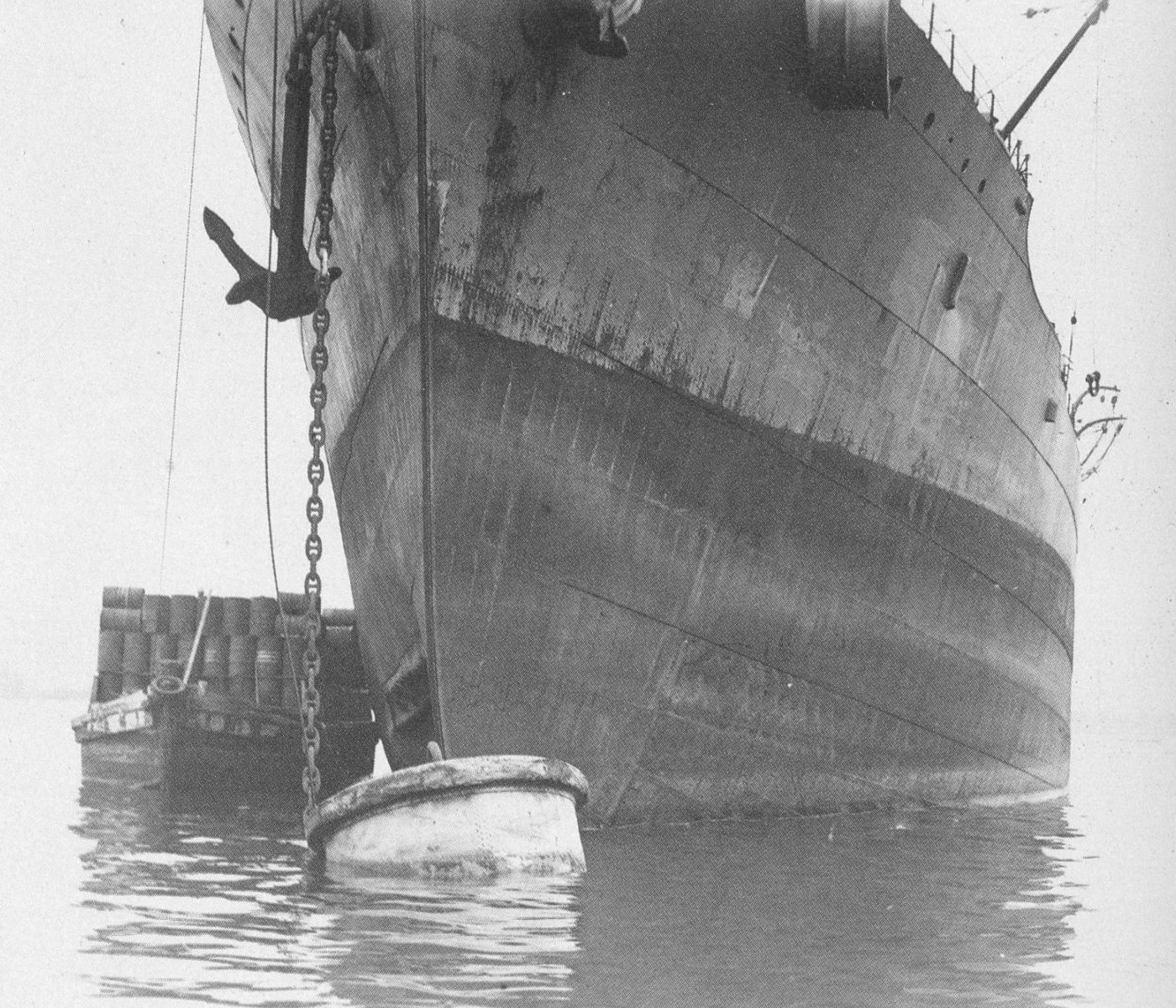
- Kazahaya on 14 August 1943 at Yokosuka Naval Arsenal

History

Japan
- Name: Kazahaya
- Namesake: Kazahaya-zaki
- Builder: Harima Dock Company
- Laid down: 30 September 1941
- Launched: 20 January 1943
- Completed: 31 March 1943
- Decommissioned: 1 December 1943
- Fate: Sunk, 6 October 1943

Class overview
- Preceded by: Ondo class
- Succeeded by: Hario class

General characteristics
- Type: Replenishment oiler
- Displacement: 18,300 long tons (18,594 t) standard
- Length: 161.00 m (528 ft 3 in) overall
- Beam: 20.10 m (65 ft 11 in)
- Draught: 8.83 m (29 ft 0 in)
- Propulsion: 1 × Ishikawajima geared turbine; 2 × Kampon water tube boilers; single shaft, 9,500 shp
- Speed: 16.5 knots (19.0 mph; 30.6 km/h)
- Capacity: 10,000 tons for heavy crude oil; 1,000 tons for gasoline
- Crew: 150
- Armament: 3 × 120 mm (4.7 in) L/45 AA guns; 6 × Type 96 25mm AA guns

Kazahaya (風早, "Fast Wind") was a Japanese fleet oiler, serving during the Second World War.

== Construction ==
In 1941, the Imperial Japanese Navy (IJN) wanted fleet oilers for their aircraft carrier task force, because they had only the eight old, low-speed tankers. The IJN prepared sixteen Kawasaki-type tankers to solve this. However, they did not have facilities for gasoline. The IJN intended to build four Kazahayas (Ship # 304-307). However, all naval arsenals were crowded at the outbreak of war. The IJN bought one of the same type of merchant tanker made by Harima with the Kazahaya naval budget.

== Service ==
She succeeded in one transportation duty, and was sunk by submarines.

== Ships in class ==
Ship #	Ship	Builder	Laid down	Launched	Completed	Fate
304	Kazahaya (風早)	Harima Dock Company	30 September 1941	20 January 1943	31 March 1943	Sunk by USS Steelhead and USS Tinosa northwest of Truk 6 October 1943.
305	Karasaki (韓崎)					Cancelled on 25 July 1943.
306	Hayasui (速吸)	Harima Dock Company	1 February 1943			Converted to the Hayasui class.
307	Inatori (稲取)					Cancelled on 25 July 1943.
5381	Kariko (雁来)					Cancelled on 5 May 1944.
5382	Tsurikake (釣掛)					Cancelled on 5 May 1944.
5383	Kumomi (雲見)					Cancelled on 5 May 1944.
5384	Kamisu (神須)					Cancelled on 5 May 1944.
5385	Kōshū (膠州)					Cancelled on 5 May 1944.
5386	Seitō (青島)					Cancelled on 5 May 1944.
5387	Noma (野間)					Cancelled on 5 May 1944.

== Bibliography ==
- "Rekishi Gunzō"., History of Pacific War Vol.62 "Ships of The Imperial Japanese Forces, Gakken (Japan), January 2008, ISBN 978-4-05-605008-0
- Ships of the World special issue Vol.47, Auxiliary Vessels of the Imperial Japanese Navy, "Kaijinsha"., (Japan), March 1997
