= Japanese submarine Ha-202 =

IJN submarine

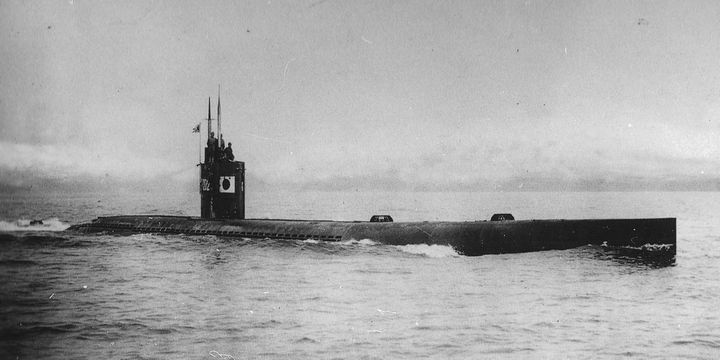
- Ha-202 on sea trials in May 1945.

History

Japan
- Name: Submarine No. 4912
- Builder: Sasebo Naval Arsenal, Sasebo, Japan
- Laid down: 1 March 1945
- Renamed: Ha-202 on 5 April 1945
- Launched: 23 April 1945
- Completed: 31 May 1945
- Commissioned: 31 May 1945
- Fate: Surrendered 2 September 1945; Stricken 30 November 1945; Scuttled 1 April 1946

General characteristics
- Type: Submarine
- Displacement: 320 long tons (325 t) surfaced; 440 long tons (447 t) submerged
- Length: 53.00 m (173 ft 11 in) overall
- Beam: 4.00 m (13 ft 1 in)
- Draft: 3.44 m (11 ft 3 in)
- Propulsion: 1 × intermediate diesel; 400 bhp surfaced; 1,250 shp submerged; single shaft
- Speed: 11.8 knots (21.9 km/h) surfaced; 13.9 knots (25.7 km/h) submerged
- Range: 3,000 nmi (5,600 km) at 10 knots (19 km/h) surfaced; 105 nmi (194 km) at 2 knots (3.7 km/h) submerged
- Test depth: 100 m (330 ft)
- Complement: 26
- Armament: 2 × 533 mm (21 in) torpedo tubes; 4 × Type 95 torpedoes; 1 × 7.7 mm machine gun

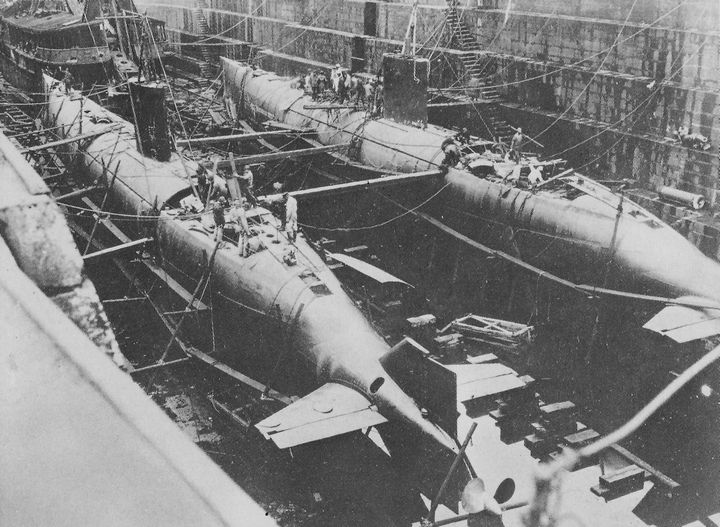
Ha-202 (right) and her sister ship Ha-201 (left) under construction at the Sasebo Naval Arsenal in Sasebo, Japan, in March or April 1945.

Ha-202 was an Imperial Japanese Navy Ha-201-class submarine. Completed and commissioned in May 1945, she served during the final months of World War II. She surrendered at the end of the war in September 1945 and was scuttled in April 1946.

== Design and description ==
At the end of 1944, the Imperial Japanese Navy decided it needed large numbers of high-speed coastal submarines to defend the Japanese Home Islands against an anticipated Allied invasion (named Operation Downfall by the Allies). To meet this requirement, the Ha-201-class submarines were designed as small, fast submarines incorporating many of the same advanced ideas implemented in the German Type XXI and Type XXIII submarines. They were capable of submerged speeds of almost 14 knots (26 km/h; 16 mph).

The Ha-201 class displaced 325 metric tons (320 long tons) surfaced and 447 metric tons (440 long tons) submerged. The submarines were 53 meters (173 ft 11 in) long, had a beam of 4.00 meters (13 ft 1 in) and a draft of 3.44 meters (11 ft 3 in). For surface running, the submarines were powered by a single 400-brake-horsepower (298 kW) diesel engine that drove one propeller shaft. When submerged the propeller was driven by a 1,250-shaft-horsepower (932 kW) electric motor. They could reach 11.8 knots (21.9 km/h; 13.6 mph) on the surface and 13.9 knots (25.7 km/h; 16.0 mph) submerged. On the surface, the Ha-201-class submarines had a range of 3,000 nautical miles (5,600 km; 3,500 mi) at 10 knots (19 km/h; 12 mph); submerged, they had a range of 105 nmi (194 km; 121 mi) at 2 knots (3.7 km/h; 2.3 mph). Their armament consisted of two 533-millimeter (21 in) torpedo tubes with four torpedoes and a single mount for a 7.7-millimeter machine gun.

== Construction and commissioning ==
Ha-202 was laid down on 1 March 1945 by the Sasebo Naval Arsenal at Sasebo, Japan, as Submarine No. 4912. She was renamed Ha-202 on 5 April 1945 and was attached provisionally to the Sasebo Naval District that day. Launched on 23 April 1945, she was completed and commissioned on 31 May 1945.

== Service history ==
Upon commissioning, Ha-202 was attached formally to the Sasebo Naval District and assigned to Submarine Division 33 in the Kure Submarine Flotilla for workups. On 1 June 1945, she departed Sasebo bound for the Sea of Japan and Nanao Bay on Honshu′s western coast, and upon arrival she began workups in Nanao Bay. She was reassigned to Submarine Division 52 on 20 July 1945.

Ha-202 had not yet conducted an operational patrol when hostilities between Japan and the Allies ended on 15 August 1945. She surrendered to the Allies at Sasebo on 2 September 1945. On 2 November 1945, she was reassigned to Japanese Submarine Division Three under United States Navy command along with her sister ships Ha-201, Ha-203, Ha-205, and Ha-210.

== Disposal ==
The Japanese struck Ha-202 from the Navy list on 30 November 1945. She was among a number of Japanese submarines the U.S. Navy scuttled off the Goto Islands in Operation Road's End on 1 April 1946, sinking just beyond the 100-fathom (600 ft; 183 m) line at 32°37′N 129°17′E.
