= Japanese fleet oiler Hario =

WWII era Japanese ship

Coordinates: 18°10′N 109°40′E

History
- Name: Hario
- Namesake: Hario Channel
- Builder: Harima Zōsen Corporation
- Laid down: 2 June 1944
- Launched: 4 October 1944
- Completed: 1 December 1944
- Commissioned: 1 December 1944
- Decommissioned: 10 May 1945
- Fate: Sunk on 3 March 1945

Class overview
- Preceded by: Kazahaya-class oiler
- Succeeded by: Muroto-class collier

General characteristics
- Type: Replenishment oiler
- Displacement: 18,500 long tons (18,797 t) standard
- Length: 154.32 m (506 ft 4 in) Lpp
- Beam: 20.00 m (65 ft 7 in)
- Draught: 8.80 m (28 ft 10 in)
- Propulsion: 1 × Mitsubishi geared turbine; 2 × Mk.21 simple boilers; single shaft, 8,600 shp
- Speed: 16.5 knots (19.0 mph; 30.6 km/h)
- Range: 9,000 nmi (17,000 km) at 16 kn (18 mph; 30 km/h)
- Capacity: unknown
- Complement: unknown
- Armament: 2 × 120 mm (4.7 in) L/45 AA guns; 16 × Type 96 25mm AA guns

The Hario (針尾) was a Japanese fleet oiler, serving during World War II. Four vessels were planned under the Maru Sen Programme; however, only one vessel was completed by the end of war.

== Construction ==
The Hario-class oilers were planned instead of the cancelled Kazahaya class oilers. The Navy Technical Department (Kampon) armed these vessels as a Type 1TL wartime standard ship.

== Service ==
The Hario was completed and assigned to the Combined Fleet on 1 December 1944, joining the Hi-89 convoy from Moji to Singapore on 24 January 1945. She arrived in Singapore on 9 February 1945, joining the Hi-94 convoy (returning to Moji from Singapore) on 23 February 1945. On 1 March, she arrived at a relay point at Yulin, Hainan. Two days later, on 3 March, she left Yulin, only to hit a mine and sink the same day. She was decommissioned 10 May.

== Ships in class ==
Ship #	Ship	Builder	Laid down	Launched	Completed	Fate
4901	Hario (針尾)	Harima Zōsen Corporation	2 June 1944	4 October 1944	1 December 1944	Struck a naval mine at Yulin and sank on 3 March 1945.
4902	Inatori (稲取)					Cancelled in 1945.
4903	Karasaki (韓崎)					Cancelled in 1945.
4904	Tatsumai (龍舞)					Cancelled in 1945.
