= Japanese submarine Ha-205 =

History

Japan
- Name: Submarine No. 4915
- Builder: Sasebo Naval Arsenal, Sasebo, Japan
- Laid down: 17 April 1945
- Renamed: Ha-205 on 1 May 1945
- Launched: 14 May 1945
- Completed: 3 July 1945
- Commissioned: 3 July 1945
- Fate: Surrendered 2 September 1945; Stricken 30 November 1945; Scuttled 9 May 1946

General characteristics
- Type: Submarine
- Displacement: 320 long tons (325 t) surfaced; 440 long tons (447 t) submerged
- Length: 53.00 m (173 ft 11 in) overall
- Beam: 4.00 m (13 ft 1 in)
- Draft: 3.44 m (11 ft 3 in)
- Propulsion: 1 × intermediate diesel; 400 bhp surfaced; 1,250 shp submerged; single shaft
- Speed: 11.8 knots (21.9 km/h) surfaced; 13.9 knots (25.7 km/h) submerged
- Range: 3,000 nmi (5,600 km) at 10 knots (19 km/h) surfaced; 105 nmi (194 km) at 2 knots (3.7 km/h) submerged
- Test depth: 100 m (328 ft)
- Complement: 26
- Armament: 2 × 533 mm (21 in) torpedo tubes; 4 × Type 95 torpedoes; 1 × 7.7 mm machine gun

Ha-205 was an Imperial Japanese Navy Ha-201-class submarine. Completed and commissioned in July 1945, she served during the final weeks of World War II. She surrendered at the end of the war in September 1945 and was scuttled in May 1946.

== Design and description ==
At the end of 1944, the Imperial Japanese Navy decided it needed large numbers of high-speed coastal submarines to defend the Japanese Home Islands against an anticipated Allied invasion (named Operation Downfall by the Allies). To meet this requirement, the Ha-201-class submarines were designed as small, fast submarines incorporating many of the same advanced ideas implemented in the German Type XXI and Type XXIII submarines. They were capable of submerged speeds of almost 14 knots (26 km/h; 16 mph).

The Ha-201 class displaced 325 metric tons (320 long tons) surfaced and 447 metric tons (440 long tons) submerged. The submarines were 53 meters (173 ft 11 in) long, had a beam of 4.00 meters (13 ft 1 in) and a draft of 3.44 meters (11 ft 3 in). For surface running, the submarines were powered by a single 400-brake-horsepower (298 kW) diesel engine that drove one propeller shaft. When submerged the propeller was driven by a 1,250-shaft-horsepower (932 kW) electric motor. They could reach 11.8 knots (21.9 km/h; 13.6 mph) on the surface and 13.9 knots (25.7 km/h; 16.0 mph) submerged. On the surface, the Ha-201-class submarines had a range of 3,000 nautical miles (5,600 km; 3,500 mi) at 10 knots (19 km/h; 12 mph); submerged, they had a range of 105 nmi (194 km; 121 mi) at 2 knots (3.7 km/h; 2.3 mph). Their armament consisted of two 533-millimeter (21 in) torpedo tubes with four torpedoes and a single mount for a 7.7-millimeter machine gun.

== Construction and commissioning ==
Ha-205 was laid down on 17 April 1945 by the Sasebo Naval Arsenal at Sasebo, Japan, as Submarine No. 4915. She was renamed Ha-205 on 1 May 1945 and was attached provisionally to the Sasebo Naval District that day. Launched on 14 May 1945, she was completed and commissioned on 3 July 1945.

== Service history ==
Upon commissioning, Ha-205 was attached formally to the Sasebo Naval District and assigned to Submarine Division 33 in the Kure Submarine Flotilla for workups. She was reassigned to Submarine Division 52 on 20 July 1945.

Ha-205 had not yet conducted an operational patrol when hostilities between Japan and the Allies ended on 15 August 1945. She surrendered to the Allies at Sasebo on 2 September 1945. On 2 November 1945, she was reassigned to Japanese Submarine Division Three under United States Navy command along with her sister ships Ha-201, Ha-202, Ha-203, and Ha-210.

== Disposal ==
The Japanese struck Ha-205 from the Navy list on 30 November 1945. She was among a number of Japanese submarines the Royal Australian Navy destroyer HMAS Quiberon and Royal Indian Navy sloop HMIS Sutlej scuttled with gunfire in the Iyo Nada in the Seto Inland Sea in Operation Bottom on 9 May 1946.
