= Japanese submarine Ha-207 =

History

Japan
- Name: Submarine No. 4917
- Builder: Sasebo Naval Arsenal, Sasebo, Japan
- Laid down: 23 April 1945
- Renamed: Ha-207 on 1 May 1945
- Launched: 26 May 1945
- Completed: 14 August 1945
- Commissioned: 14 August 1945
- Fate: Surrendered 2 September 1945; Stricken 30 November 1945; Scuttled 5 April 1946

General characteristics
- Type: Submarine
- Displacement: 320 long tons (325 t) surfaced; 440 long tons (447 t) submerged
- Length: 53.00 m (173 ft 11 in) overall
- Beam: 4.00 m (13 ft 1 in)
- Draft: 3.44 m (11 ft 3 in)
- Propulsion: 1 × intermediate diesel; 400 bhp surfaced; 1,250 shp submerged; single shaft
- Speed: 11.8 knots (21.9 km/h) surfaced; 13.9 knots (25.7 km/h) submerged
- Range: 3,000 nmi (5,600 km) at 10 knots (19 km/h) surfaced; 105 nmi (194 km) at 2 knots (3.7 km/h) submerged
- Test depth: 100 m (328 ft)
- Complement: 26
- Armament: 2 × 533 mm (21 in) torpedo tubes; 4 × Type 95 torpedoes; 1 × 7.7 mm machine gun

Ha-207 was an Imperial Japanese Navy Ha-201-class submarine. Completed and commissioned in August 1945 on the day before hostilities ended in World War II, she surrendered in September 1945 and was scuttled in April 1946.

== Design and description ==
At the end of 1944, the Imperial Japanese Navy decided it needed large numbers of high-speed coastal submarines to defend the Japanese Home Islands against an anticipated Allied invasion (named Operation Downfall by the Allies). To meet this requirement, the Ha-201-class submarines were designed as small, fast submarines incorporating many of the same advanced ideas implemented in the German Type XXI and Type XXIII submarines. They were capable of submerged speeds of almost 14 knots (26 km/h; 16 mph).

The Ha-201 class displaced 325 metric tons (320 long tons) surfaced and 447 metric tons (440 long tons) submerged. The submarines were 53 meters (173 ft 11 in) long, had a beam of 4.00 meters (13 ft 1 in) and a draft of 3.44 meters (11 ft 3 in). For surface running, the submarines were powered by a single 400-brake-horsepower (298 kW) diesel engine that drove one propeller shaft. When submerged the propeller was driven by a 1,250-shaft-horsepower (932 kW) electric motor. They could reach 11.8 knots (21.9 km/h; 13.6 mph) on the surface and 13.9 knots (25.7 km/h; 16.0 mph) submerged. On the surface, the Ha-201-class submarines had a range of 3,000 nautical miles (5,600 km; 3,500 mi) at 10 knots (19 km/h; 12 mph); submerged, they had a range of 105 nmi (194 km; 121 mi) at 2 knots (3.7 km/h; 2.3 mph). Their armament consisted of two 533-millimeter (21 in) torpedo tubes with four torpedoes and a single mount for a 7.7-millimeter machine gun.

== Construction and commissioning ==
Ha-207 was laid down on 23 April 1945 by the Sasebo Naval Arsenal at Sasebo, Japan, as Submarine No. 4917. She was renamed Ha-207 on 1 May 1945 and was attached provisionally to the Sasebo Naval District that day. She was launched simultaneously with her sister ship Ha-208 on 26 May 1945 and was completed and commissioned on 14 August 1945.

== Service history ==
Upon commissioning, Ha-207 was attached formally to the Sasebo Naval District and assigned to Submarine Division 52. On 15 August 1945 — the day after Ha-207 was commissioned — hostilities between Japan and the Allies ended. She surrendered to the Allies at Sasebo on 2 September 1945.

== Disposal ==
The Japanese struck Ha-205 from the Navy list on 30 November 1945. She was scuttled along with the submarines Ro-31, Ha-210, Ha-215, Ha-216, Ha-217, Ha-219, and Ha-228 off Sasebo Bay on 5 April 1946.
