= USS Goodrich =

Gearing-class destroyer

USS Goodrich (DD-831)
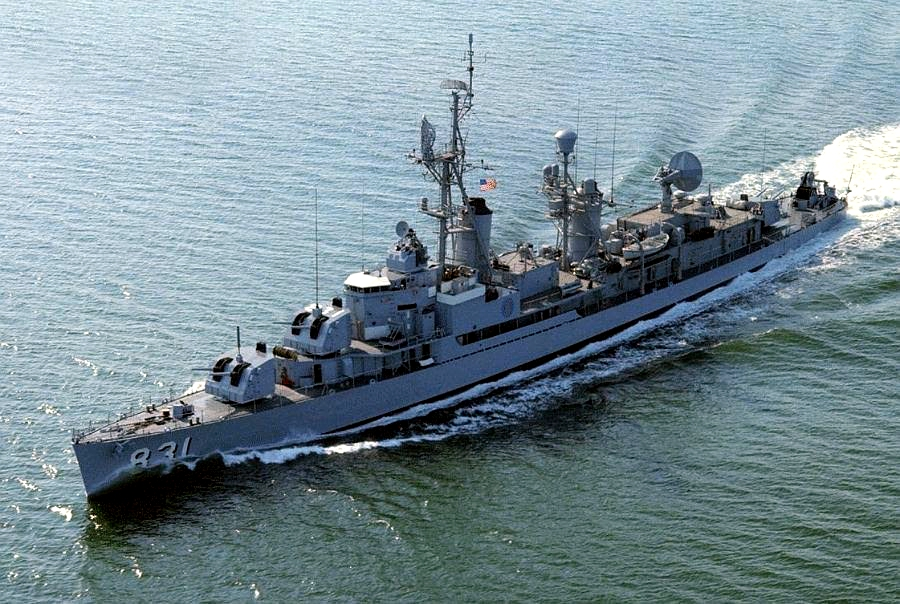
- Goodrich underway in the 1960s

History

United States
- Name: USS Goodrich
- Builder: Bath Iron Works, Bath, Maine
- Laid down: 18 September 1944
- Launched: 25 February 1945
- Sponsored by: Mrs. Caspar F. Goodrich
- Commissioned: 24 April 1945
- Decommissioned: 30 November 1969
- Reclassified: DDR-831, 18 March 1949; DD-831, 1 January 1969
- Stricken: 1 February 1974
- Identification: Callsign: NBAN; Hull number: DD-831
- Fate: Sold for scrap, 12 September 1977

General characteristics
- Class & type: Gearing-class destroyer
- Displacement: 3,460 long tons (3,516 t) full
- Length: 390 ft 6 in (119.02 m)
- Beam: 40 ft 10 in (12.45 m)
- Draft: 14 ft 4 in (4.37 m)
- Propulsion: Geared turbines, 2 shafts, 60,000 shp (45 MW)
- Speed: 35 knots (65 km/h; 40 mph)
- Range: 4,500 nmi (8,300 km; 5,200 mi) at 20 kn (37 km/h; 23 mph)
- Complement: 336
- Armament: 6 × 5"/38 caliber guns; 12 × 40 mm AA guns; 11 × 20 mm AA guns; 10 × 21 inch (533 mm) torpedo tubes; 6 × depth charge projectors; 2 × depth charge tracks

USS Goodrich (DD/DDR-831) was a Gearing-class destroyer of the United States Navy, named for Rear Admiral Caspar F. Goodrich (1847–1925), and his son, Lieutenant Caspar Goodrich (died 1907).

Goodrich was launched on 25 February 1945 by the Bath Iron Works Co., Bath, Maine; sponsored by Mrs. Caspar F. Goodrich, widow of Admiral Goodrich and mother of Lt. Goodrich; and commissioned on 24 April 1945.

== Service history ==
After shakedown training in the Caribbean, Goodrich transited the Panama Canal on 12 November 1945 to support the occupation of Japan. She patrolled between principal Japanese ports until October 1946; then she based at Tsingtao, China, for patrol along the coast of Korea. The destroyer returned to San Francisco, California, on 21 December 1946 and departed on 7 January 1947 to base at Newport, Rhode Island, as a unit of the United States Atlantic Fleet.

Goodrich overhauled in the New York Naval Shipyard, then served in the Mediterranean Sea (2 February - 22 May 1948). This was her first of many annual tours with the "steel gray stabilizers" of the 6th Fleet.

Goodrich was reclassified a radar picket destroyer, DDR-831, on 18 March 1949.

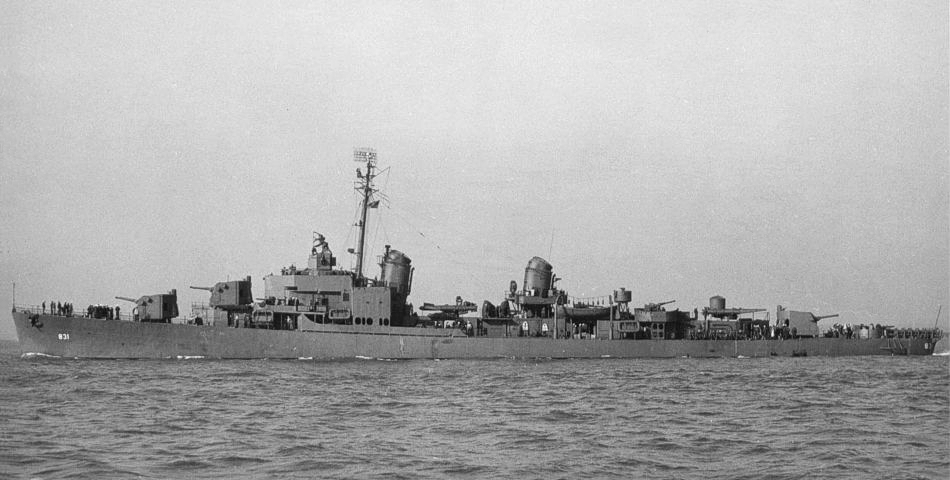
Goodrich in 1945.

Her service included patrol along the Israeli-Egyptian border of the Red Sea in February 1956 to help stem the Mid-East crisis that finally culminated in the nationalization of the Suez Canal. When fighting erupted, she sped back to the Mediterranean in November 1956 to protect Americans in that area. The destroyer supported the landing of Marines at Beirut, Lebanon, on 14 July 1958.

Goodrich shifted her home port in June 1959 from Newport to Mayport, Florida. Thereafter her annual deployments to the Mediterranean included intensive training in all forms of naval warfare with NATO units and a constant readiness with the 6th Fleet. She interrupted her schedule in January 1960, entering the Norfolk Navy Yard for an eight-month modernization overhaul (FRAM II) which included complete renovation and latest weapons and shipboard equipment. She was on Project Mercury recovery station on 12 February 1962 as Lieutenant Colonel John H. Glenn, USMC, made his successful orbital space flight.

Goodrich went on alert again with the 6th Fleet during 24 October to 20 November 1962 when the Navy responded to President John F. Kennedy's call for a quarantine of Cuba that choked off the flow of military supplies and enforced the American demands for the withdrawal of the Soviet missile experts and equipment. On 22 July 1966 the destroyer got underway from Mayport on her 13th 6th Fleet deployment. She cruised throughout the Mediterranean for five months, unobtrusively patrolling with the 6th Fleet and taking part in combined naval warfare exercises with units of the Turkish, Greek, British, and Italian Navies. She returned to Mayport on 20 December 1966 for upkeep and type training.

Goodrich was reclassified DD-831 on 1 January 1969, and was decommissioned on 30 November 1969. Berthed at Orange, Texas, Goodrich was struck from the Naval Vessel Register on 1 February 1974. She was sold on 12 September 1977, and broken up for scrap.
