= Sasebo Naval Arsenal =

Shipyard of the Imperial Japanese Navy

Coordinates: 33.168°N 129.735°E

- Sasebo, Nagasaki Prefecture, Japan
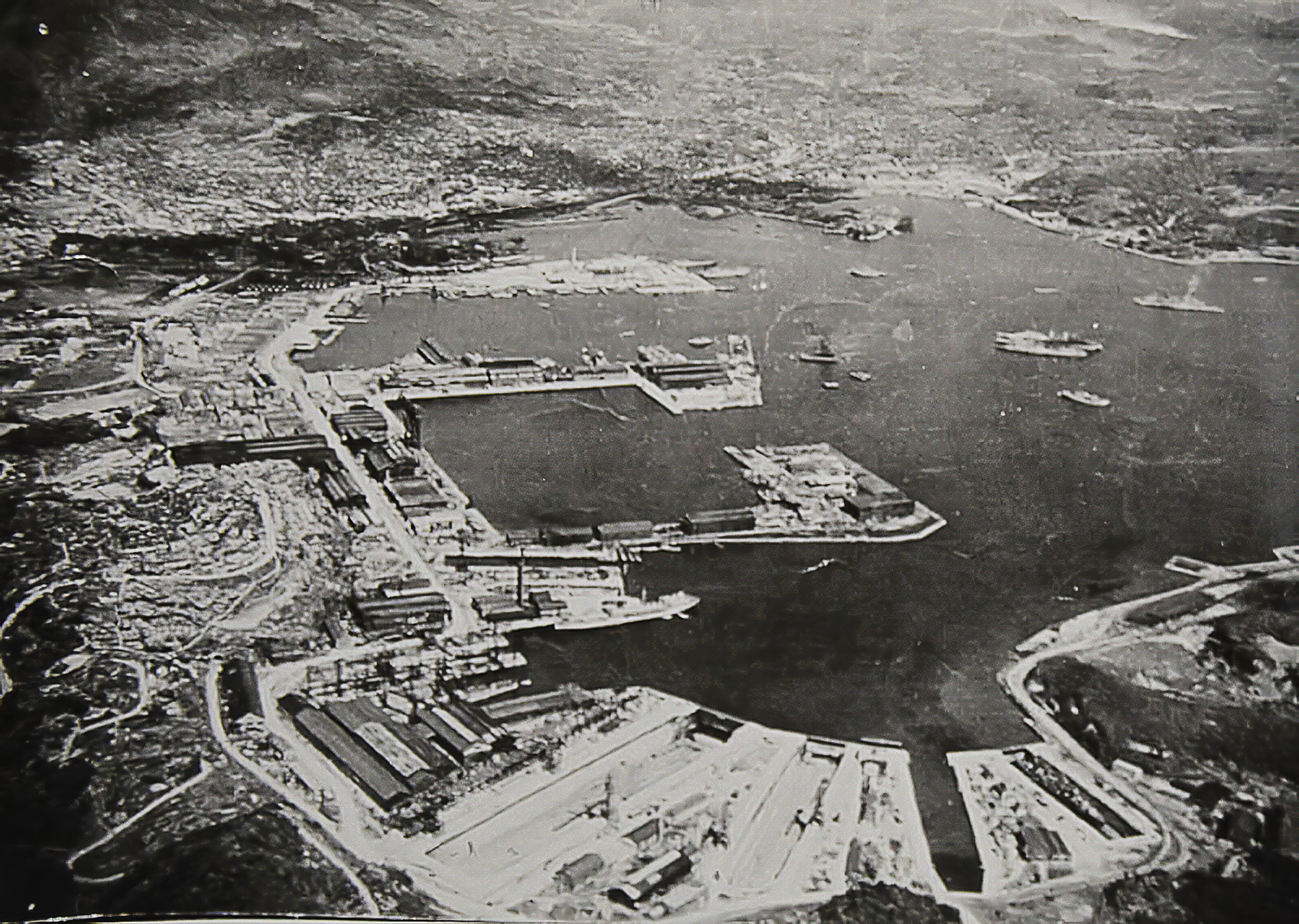
- Panoramic view of Sasebo Naval Arsenal (c. 1920-1930)

Site information
- Type: Shipyard
- Controlled by: Imperial Japanese Navy

Site history
- Built: 1886
- In use: 1886–1945

Sasebo Naval Arsenal (佐世保海軍工廠, Sasebo kaigun kōshō) was one of four principal naval shipyards owned and operated by the Imperial Japanese Navy.

== History ==
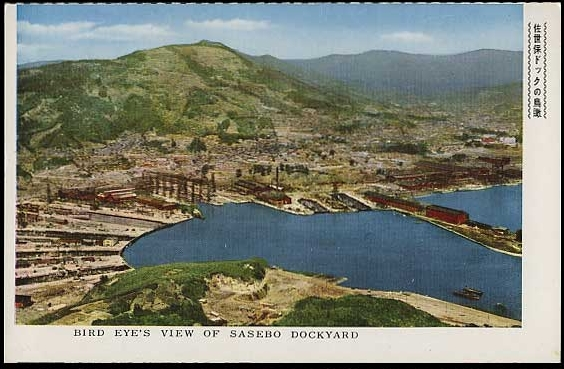
Sasebo Naval Arsenal in commemorative postcard, 1930s

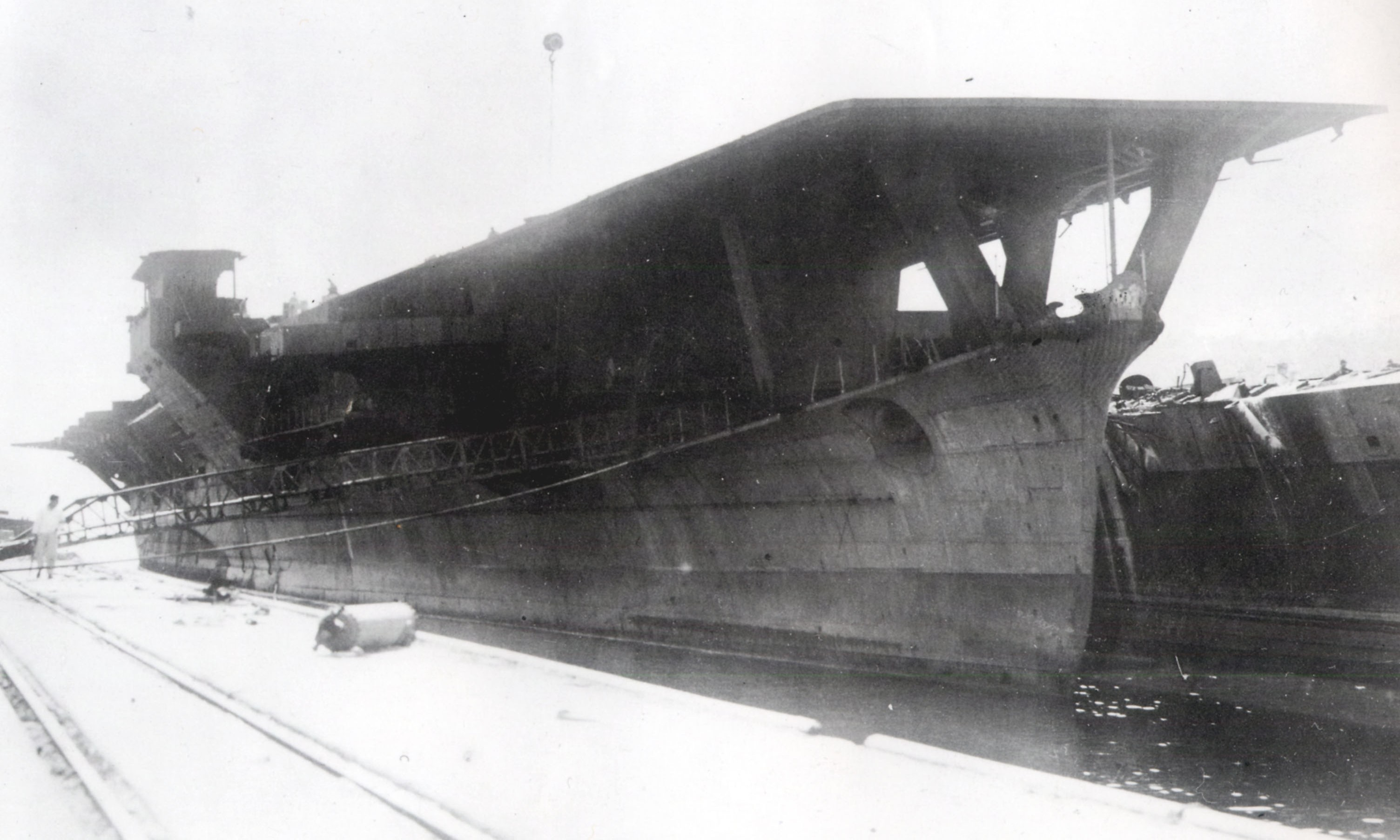
Aircraft carrier Ibuki under dismantling operation at Sasebo. October 1946

The Sasebo Naval District was established at Sasebo, Nagasaki in 1886, as the third of the naval districts responsible for the defense of the Japanese home islands. After the establishment of the navy base, a ship repair facility was established in 1889 with a dry dock. With the addition of equipment and facilities for ship production by 1897, the "Sasebo Shipyards" were officially established, and renamed the "Sasebo Naval Arsenal" in 1903. Construction of the arsenal was supervised by the French engineer Louis-Émile Bertin.

In 1913, a 250-ton crane was installed, and the shipbuilding facilities expanded to permit the construction of large warships. With the mothballing of the Maizuru Naval Arsenal due to restrictions by the Washington Naval Treaty, much of the design and prototype work for new classes of destroyers and torpedo boats formerly done at Maizuru was shifted to Sasebo. The facilities at Sasebo were also used for the conversion of the Akagi and Kaga from battleships to aircraft carriers.

The Imperial Japanese Navy employed some 50,000 people at the Sasebo Naval Arsenal at the peak of World War II, constructing and refitting destroyers, light cruisers, submarines and other various naval vessels. The 21st Naval Air Arsenal (Dai-Nijuichi Kaigun Kokusho), established jointly at Sasebo and Omura, produced a total of 966 aircraft. The facilities at Sasebo were used for repairs on the battleships Yamato and Musashi during the Pacific War.

After the surrender of Japan, On September 22, 1945, the 5th Marine Division landed at Sasebo, and in June 1946, United States Fleet Activities Sasebo was formally established on a portion of the former Sasebo Naval Arsenal. The remaining portion of the shipyards was given into civilian hands with the establishment of Sasebo Heavy Industries in 1946. Sasebo Heavy Industries is one of Japan's few remaining active shipbuilders.

== Ship class produced at Sasebo Naval Arsenal ==
=== Destroyers ===
==== World War I ====
- Kamikaze-class (1905): Yūgure, Yūdachi, Mikazuki, Nowaki
- Kaba-class: Sakaki
- Momo-class: Momo, Yanagi
- Enoki-class: Maki, Keyaki

==== World War II ====
- Kamikaze-class (1922): Yūnagi
- Mutsuki-class: Mutsuki, Mikazuki
- Fubuki Type-1(Fubuki-class): Shinonome, Uranami
- Fubuki Type-2(Ayanami-class): Asagiri, Akebono, Oboro
- Fubuki Type-3(Akatsuki-class): Akatsuki
- Hatsuharu-class: Hatsuharu, Wakaba
- Shiratsuyu-class: Shiratsuyu, Yūdachi
- Asashio-class: Asashio, Natsugumo
- Kagerō-class: Yukikaze, Isokaze
- Akizuki-class: Harutsuki, Natsuzuki, Michitsuki(Unfinished), Ōtsuki(Unfinished)

=== Cruisers ===
- Tenryū-class: Tatsuta
- Kuma-class: Kuma, Kitakami
- Nagara-class: Nagara, Yura
- Experimental cruiser Yūbari
- Agano-class: Agano, Yahagi, Sakawa

=== Submarines ===
- Type B: I-27, I-32, I-34, I-38, I-39, I-43, I-45
- Type C: I-18, I-24, I-46, I-47, I-48
- Sentoku class: I-401, I-402
- Kaidai-type: I-154, I-60, I-63, I-166, I-70, I-174
- Kaichū-type: Ro-24, Ro-25, Ro-26, Ro-28, Ro-37, Ro-42

=== Aircraft carriers ===
- Taiyō-class escort carrier: Taiyō
