= Type 95 torpedo =

Torpedo used by Japan during WW II

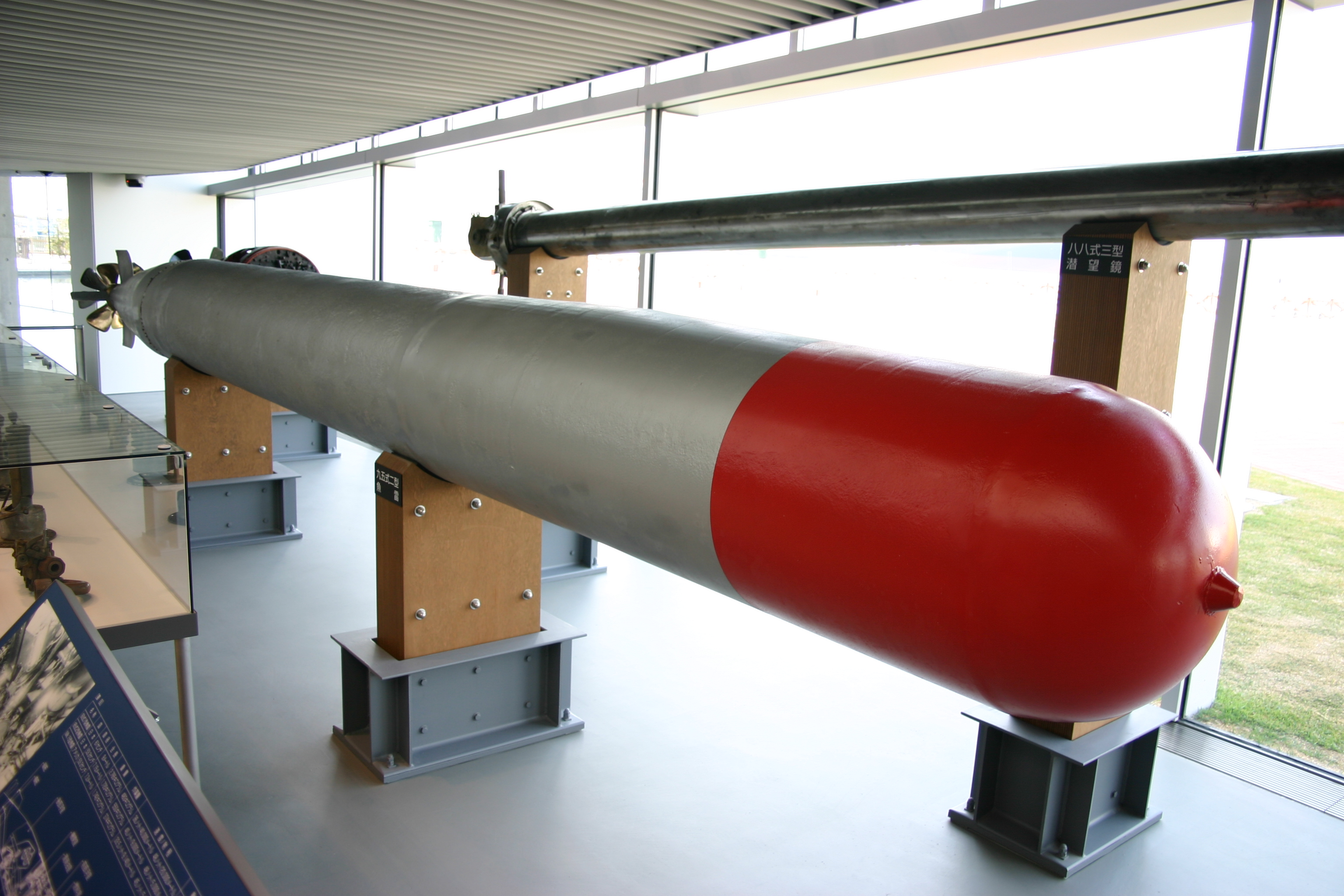
- Type 95 torpedo display at Yamato Museum.
- Type: Torpedo
- Place of origin: Empire of Japan

Service history
- In service: 1938–1945
- Used by: Imperial Japanese Navy
- Wars: Second World War

Production history
- Designed: 1935
- Developed from: Type 93 torpedo

Specifications
- Mass: Modif. 1: 1.66 t (3700 lb); Model 2: 1.73 t (3800 lb)
- Length: 7.15 m (23 ft 5 in)
- Diameter: 53.3 cm (21.0 in)
- Effective firing range: Modif. 1: 49 kts 9000 m (4.9 nmi), 45 kts 12,000 m (6.5 nmi); Model 2: 49kts 5500 m (3.0 nmi), 45 kts 7500 m (4.0 nmi)
- Warhead: 60% TNT, 40% hexanitrodiphenylamine
- Warhead weight: Modif. 1: 405 kg (893 lb), Model 2: 550 kg (1210 lb)
- Detonation mechanism: Inertia pistol, magnetic pistols from July 1944
- Engine: Wet-heater, 2-cyl. double-acting reciprocating engine (Whitehead-Weymouth-type)
- Propellant: Kerosene / pure oxygen
- Maximum speed: 49 kn (91 km/h)
- Launch platform: Submarines

The Type 95 torpedo was a torpedo used by submarines of the Imperial Japanese Navy during World War II.

The Type 95 was based on the Type 93 torpedo (Long Lance); its mod 1 had a smaller 405 kg (893 lb) and mod 2 had a larger 550 kg (1,210 lb) warhead size than the Type 93's 490 kg (1,080 lb). It was intended to be fired from a standard 533 mm (21.0 in) torpedo tube of a submerged submarine.

The range of the Type 95 was (for the mod 1) 9,000 m (9,800 yd) at 49–51 kn (91–94 km/h; 56–59 mph), or 12,000 m (13,000 yd) at 45–47 kn (83–87 km/h; 52–54 mph), which was about three times the range of the U.S. Navy Mark 14 with the same speed at 45 to 47 knots.

The Type 95 was the fastest torpedo in common use by any navy during World War II. Its warhead size was the largest of any submarine torpedo, and second only to the Type 93 used by Japanese surface ships. Its engine was a kerosene-oxygen wet-heater rather than the compressed air used by most torpedo types at the time.

== Bibliography ==
- Boyne, Walter J. (1995), Clash of Titans, Simon and Schuster, ISBN 0-684-80196-5.
- Branfill-Cook, Roger (2014), Torpedo : the complete history of the world's most revolutionary naval weapon, Yorkshire: Seaforth Publishing, ISBN 978-1-84832-215-8.
