= List of Japanese naval armaments supplement programmes =

This is a list of Japanese naval armaments supplement programmes.

- 1st Naval Armaments Supplement Programme (Japan, 1931)
- 2nd Naval Armaments Supplement Programme (Japan, 1934)
- 3rd Naval Armaments Supplement Programme (Japan, 1937)
- 4th Naval Armaments Supplement Programme (Japan, 1939)
- Temporal Naval Armaments Supplement Programme (Japan, 1940)
- Additional Naval Armaments Supplement Programme (Japan, 1941)
- Rapid Naval Armaments Supplement Programme (Japan, 1941)
- Modified 5th Naval Armaments Supplement Programme (Japan, 1942)
- Wartime Naval Armaments Supplement Programme (Japan, 1944)

== Works cited ==
- 末国正雄; 高野庄平, eds. (1969). 海軍軍戦備(1)昭和十六年十一月まで [Naval Warfare (1) Through November 1941]. Senshi Sōsho (in Japanese). Vol. 31. Asagumo Shimbunsha.
