= Japanese minelayer Sokuten =

Two Japanese warships have borne the name Sokuten:

- Japanese minelayer Sokuten (1913), a Sokuten-class auxiliary minelayer launched in 1913 and stricken in 1936
- Japanese minelayer Sokuten (1938), a Sokuten-class minelayer launched in 1938 and sunk in 1944
