= Japanese target ship Hakachi =

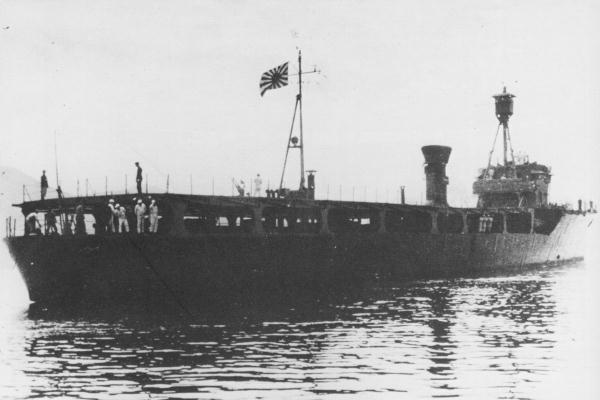
- Hakachi on 9 November 1943 at Aioi

History

Japan
- Name: Hakachi
- Namesake: Cape of Hakachi
- Ordered: fiscal 1941 under the Maru Tsui Programme (Ship number 660)
- Builder: Harima Zōsen Corporation, Aioi
- Cost: 4.8 million JPY in 1941
- Laid down: 1 February 1943
- Launched: 25 May 1943
- Completed: 18 November 1943
- Commissioned: 18 November 1943
- Decommissioned: 30 November 1945
- Fate: Used as a repatriation transport, later scrapped

General characteristics
- Type: Target ship
- Displacement: 1,641 long tons (1,667 t) standard
- Length: 93.50 m (306.8 ft) o/a; 87.45 m (286.9 ft) pp
- Beam: 11.30 m (37 ft 1 in)
- Draught: 3.81 m (12 ft 6 in)
- Propulsion: 2 × Ho-Gō Kampon water-tube boilers; 2 × Kampon geared turbines, 2 shafts, 4,400 hp (3,300 kW)
- Speed: 19.3 knots (22.2 mph; 35.7 km/h)
- Range: 4,000 nmi (7,400 km) at 14 knots
- Complement: 148
- Armament: Originally 4 × Type 93 13 mm AA guns

The Hakachi (波勝) was a bomb target ship of the Imperial Japanese Navy (IJN) serving during the Second World War, the only ship of her class.

== Background ==
Project number J32. Before the Pacific War, the IJN wanted to raise the training efficiency of bomber pilots. The old destroyer Yakaze was converted to a target ship for bombing training, however, her armour was too thin. Yakaze was only able to sustain the impact of 1 kilogram bombs. The IJN wanted a better target ship to join the Combined Fleet for use in the southern front. Hakachi was built for this propose, she was able to sustain 10 kilogram bombs dropped from 4,000 m (13,000 ft) meters. Hakachi was the only purpose-built vessel in the IJN designed and used as a bombing target ship. Her flat steel deck gave her the appearance of an escort carrier and protected against 10 and 30 kilogram training bombs. The IJN later built the Ōhama-class as next generation target ships, but the only completed ship of the class was used as an escort ship instead. Hence Hakachi was the only ship that remained available for training new bomber pilots.

== Service ==
The Hakachi was commissioned on 18 November 1943 and on 1 December, she was assigned to the Combined Fleet. On 24 December, she sailed to Truk where she was used for bomber training. Two months later, she was heavily damaged by U.S. carrier aircraft during Operation Hailstone. She sheltered at Palau on 24 February 1944, and was repaired by Akashi. She was modified to serve as an escort for local convoys and rearmed with two 4.7-inch and 28 Type 96 25-mm AA guns and carried 36 depth charges. On 18 March, she sailed to the Lingga Islands. On 24 May, she sailed to Davao Gulf. She worked in each place. On 1 October, she undertook convoy escort operations. She survived the war in the Seto Inland Sea. On 1 December 1945 the ship was assigned to the Allied Repatriation Service as a special transport ship. On 11 December 1946, Hakachi arrived at Sasebo on her last repatriation voyage. In all, she transported 1,641 former military personnel back to Japan. In 1947 she was scrapped in Osaka at Fujinagata Zosensho.

== Works cited ==
- Fukui, Shizuo (December 1994). 写真 日本海軍全艦艇史 [The Complete Photo History of Japanese Navy Ships] (in Japanese). ISBN 4-584-17054-1.
- 日本造船学会 (The Society of Naval Architects of Japan), ed. (1981). 戦前・戦後編 [Pre-War and Post-War]. 昭和造船史 (Showa Era Shipbuilding History) (in Japanese). Vol. 1 (3rd ed.). Harashobo. ISBN 4-562-00302-2.

== Bibliography ==
- Ships of the World special issue Vol.47 Auxiliary Vessels of the Imperial Japanese Navy, Kaijinsha, (Japan), March 1997
- The Maru Special, Japanese Naval Vessels No.34, Japanese Auxiliary ships, Ushio Shobō (Japan), December 1979
- Senshi Sōsho Vol.31, Naval armaments and war preparation (1), "Until November 1941", Asagumo Simbun (Japan), November 1969
