= Natsushima =

Natsushima is Japanese for "summer island", and may refer to:

- Japanese minelayer Natsushima, more than one ship of the Imperial Japanese Navy
- Tonowas, an island in Chuuk (formerly Truk) Lagoon known to the Japanese as "Natsushima" or "Natsu Shima"
