= Type A submarine =

Class of submarine in the Imperial Japanese Navy

Class overview
- Name: Type-A submarines
- Builders: Kure Naval Arsenal; Kawasaki Shipbuilding
- Operators: Imperial Japanese Navy
- Preceded by: Junsen Type
- Succeeded by: Junsen Type B
- Subclasses: Type-A (I-9-class); Type-A Modified 1 (I-12-class); Type-A Modified 2 (I-13-class)
- Built: 1938–1945
- In commission: 1941–1945

The Cruiser submarine Type-A (巡潜甲型潜水艦, Junsen Kō-gata sensuikan) was a class of submarine in the Imperial Japanese Navy (IJN), which served during the Second World War. The Type-A submarines were built to take a role of the command ships for submarine squadrons. For this reason they had equipment for a headquarters, better radio facilities and a floatplane.

== Class variants ==
The Type-A submarines were divided into four classes:

- Type-A (甲型（伊九型）, Kō-gata, I-9-class)
- Type-A Mod.1 (甲型改一（伊十二型）, Kō-gata Kai-1, I-12-class)
- Type-A Mod.2 (甲型改二（伊十三型）, Kō-gata Kai-2, I-13-class)
- V21 Type (第5094号艦型, Dai-5094-Gō kan-gata, 5094th vessel-class). The 5094th vessel class boats were not built and remained only a design.

=== Type-A (I-9 class) ===
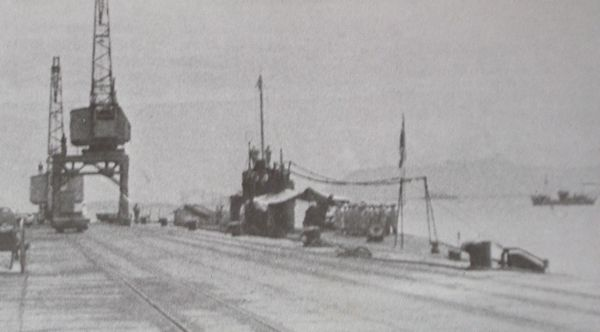
I-10 in 1942 in Penang

Project number S35Ja. Their design was based on the Junsen III (I-7 class). Three boats were built in 1938-42 under the Maru 3 Programme (Boat # 35 - 36) and Maru 4 Programme (Boat # 138).

- Boats in class

Boat No.	Boat	Builder	Laid down	Launched	Completed	Results	Fate
35	I-9	Kure Naval Arsenal	25–01–1938	20–05–1939	13–02–1941	Sank USS Lahaina 12–12–1941	Sunk by USS Frazier at Kiska 52°08′N 177°38′E 13–06–1943.
36	I-10	Kawasaki-Kōbe Shipyard	07–06–1938	20–09–1939	31–10–1941	Sank Panamanian merchant ship Donerail 10–12–1941; Sank USS Melvin H. Baker 05–06–1942; Sank Panamanian merchant ship Atlantic Gulf 06–06–1942; Sank RMS King Lud 08–06–1942; Sank RMS Queen Victoria 28–06–1942; Sank USS Express 30–06–1942; Sank Greek merchantman Nymphe 06–07–1942; Sank RMS Hartismere 08–07–1942; Sank Dutch merchant ship Alchiba 09–07–1942; Sank USS Samuel Gompers 30–01–1943; Sank USS Gulfwave 01–03–1943; Sank Norwegian merchantman Alcides 22–07–1943; Sank Norwegian merchant ship Bramora 14–09–1943; Sank USS Elias Howe 24–09–1943; Sank Norwegian merchant ship Storvixen 01–10–1943; Sank Norwegian merchantman Anna Knudsen 02–10–1943; Sank RMS Congella 24–10–1943; Sank or damaged unknown warship 02–07–1944	Sunk by USS David W. Taylor and USS Riddle east of Saipan 15°26′N 147°48′E 04–07–1944.
138	I-11	Kawasaki-Kōbe Shipyard	10–04–1940	28–02–1941	16–05–1942	Sank Greek merchant ship George S. Livanos 20–07–1942; Sank USS Coast Farmer 21–07–1942; Sank USS William Dawes 22–07–1942; Damaged HMAS Hobart 20–07–1943; Damaged USS Matthew Lyon 11–08–1943	Lost in an accident or sunk by a mine near Funafuti January 1944.

=== Type-A Mod.1 (I-12 class) ===
Project number S35B. Five boats were planned under the Maru Tsui Programme (Boat # 620 - 621) and the Kai-Maru 5 Programme (Boat # 5091 - 5093). They were equipped with less powerful diesel engines which shortened the time needed to build them. Only one boat, I-12, was completed to the original design. The I-13 and the later boats were converted to a new submarine class (I-13 class), because the number of I-400 class boats was reduced.

- Boats in class

Boat No.	Boat	Builder	Laid down	Launched	Completed	Results	Fate
620	I-12	Kawasaki-Kōbe Shipyard	05–11–1942	03–08–1943	25–05–1944	Sank USS John A. Johnson 30–10–1944	Sunk by minesweeper USS Ardent on 13–11–1944.
621	I-13	Kawasaki-Kōbe Shipyard	04–02–1943				Converted to the I-13 class in October 1943.
5091	I-14	Kawasaki-Kōbe Shipyard	18–05–1943				Converted to the I-13 class in October 1943.
5092	I-15	Kawasaki-Senshū Shipyard	30–04–1943				Converted to the I-13 class in October 1943.
5093	I-1	Kawasaki-Senshū Shipyard	24–06–1943				Converted to the I-13 class in October 1943.

=== Type-A Mod.2 (I-13 class) ===
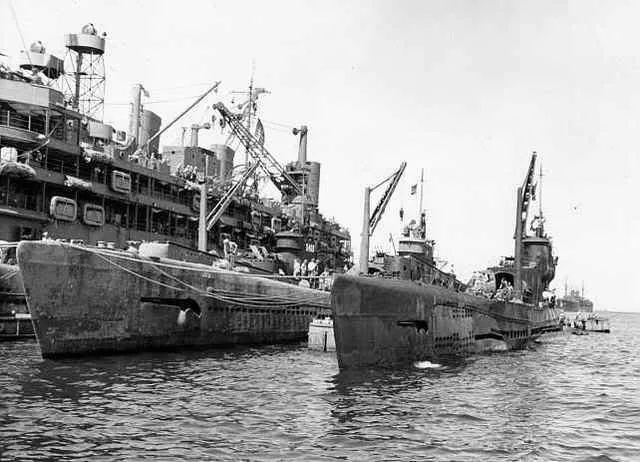
(Left to right) USS Proteus, I-400, I-401 and I-14 on 29 August 1945 at Yokosuka

Project number S35C. Four boats were planned under the Maru Tsui Programme (Boat # 621) and the Kai-Maru 5 Programme (Boat # 5091 - 5093). However, four boats were converted to new submarine class (I-13 class), because a number of submarines of the I-400 class were cancelled. They had a large hangar and were equipped with bulges to be able to operate 2 × special Aichi M6A1 Seiran attack bombers. The headquarters institutions were removed.

- Boats in class

Boat No.	Boat	Builder	Laid down	Launched	Completed	Results	Fate
621	I-13	Kawasaki-Kōbe Shipyard	04–02–1943	30–11–1943	16–12–1944		Sunk by USS Lawrence C. Taylor, USS Robert F. Keller and aircraft from USS Anzio northeast of the Ogasawara Islands 16–07–1945.
5091	I-14	Kawasaki-Kōbe Shipyard	18–05–1943	14–03–1944	14–03–1945		Captured by USS Murray 27–08–1945, decommissioned 15–09–1945, sunk as a target off the Hawaiian Islands 28–05–1946.
5092	I-15	Kawasaki-Senshū Shipyard; Kawasaki-Kōbe Shipyard (after launch)	30–04–1943	12–04–1944			Converted to a tanker submarine in June 1945; 90% complete; scrapped in 1945.
5093	I-1	Kawasaki-Kōbe Shipyard; Kawasaki-Senshū Shipyard (after launch)	24–06–1943	10–06–1944			70% complete; Sunk by a typhoon on 18–09–1945; later salvaged and scrapped.

=== V21 Type ===
Project number S48. Three boats were planned under the Kai-Maru 5 Programme. However, all boats were cancelled in late 1943, because the IJN turned its attention to the construction of Type E submarine (戊型潜水艦, Bo-gata sensuikan) in 1945.

- Boats in class

Boat No.	Boat	Builder	Laid down	Launched	Completed	Fate
5094 - 5096						Cancelled in 1943.

== Characteristics ==
Type		Type-A (I-9)	Type-A Mod.1 (I-12)	Type-A Mod.2 (I-13)	V21 Type
Displacement	Surfaced	2,434 long tons (2,473 t)	2,390 long tons (2,428 t)	2,620 long tons (2,662 t)	2,330 long tons (2,367 t)
Displacement	Submerged	4,150 long tons (4,217 t)	4,172 long tons (4,239 t)	4,762 long tons (4,838 t)	No data
Length (overall)		113.70 m (373 ft 0 in)	113.70 m (373 ft 0 in)	113.70 m (373 ft 0 in)	111.00 m (364 ft 2 in) (waterline)
Beam		9.55 m (31 ft 4 in)	9.55 m (31 ft 4 in)	11.70 m (38 ft 5 in)	9.82 m (32 ft 3 in)
Draft		5.36 m (17 ft 7 in)	5.36 m (17 ft 7 in)	5.89 m (19 ft 4 in)	5.50 m (18 ft 1 in)
Depth		8.30 m (27 ft 3 in)	8.30 m (27 ft 3 in)	8.30 m (27 ft 3 in)	No data
Power plant and shaft		2 × Kampon Mk.2 Model 10 diesels 2 shafts	2 × Kampon Mk.22 Model 10 diesels 2 shafts	2 × Kampon Mk.22 Model 10 diesels 2 shafts	2 × Kampon Mk.2 Model 10 diesels 2 shafts
Power	Surfaced	12,400 bhp	4,700 bhp	4,700 bhp	11,000 bhp
Power	Submerged	2,400 shp	1,200 shp	600 shp	2,400 shp
Speed	Surfaced	23.5 knots (43.5 km/h)	17.7 knots (32.8 km/h)	16.7 knots (30.9 km/h)	22.4 knots (41.5 km/h)
Speed	Submerged	8.0 knots (14.8 km/h)	6.2 knots (11.5 km/h)	5.5 knots (10.2 km/h)	8.0 knots (14.8 km/h)
Range	Surfaced	16,000 nmi (30,000 km) at 16 knots (30 km/h)	22,000 nmi (41,000 km) at 16 knots (30 km/h)	21,000 nmi (39,000 km) at 16 knots (30 km/h)	16,000 nmi (30,000 km) at 16 knots (30 km/h)
Range	Submerged	90 nmi (170 km) at 3 knots (5.6 km/h)	75 nmi (139 km) at 3 knots (5.6 km/h)	60 nmi (110 km) at 3 knots (5.6 km/h)	80 nmi (150 km) at 3 knots (5.6 km/h)
Test depth		100 m (330 ft)	100 m (330 ft)	100 m (330 ft)	100 m (330 ft)
Fuel		878 tons	917 tons	917 tons	880 tons
Complement		104	112	108	No data
Armament (initial)		• 6 × 533 mm (21 in) Torpedo tubes (6 × front) • 18 × Type 95 torpedoes • 1 × 140 mm (5.5 in) L/40 11th Year Type Naval gun • 4 × Type 96 25mm AA guns	• 6 × 533 mm (21 in) TTs (6 × front) • 18 × Type 95 torpedoes • 1 × 140 mm (5.5 in) L/40 11th Year Type Naval gun • 4 × Type 96 25mm AA guns	• 6 × 533 mm (21 in) TTs (6 × front) • 12 × Type 95 torpedoes • 1 × 140 mm (5.5 in) L/40 11th Year Type Naval gun • 10 × Type 96 25mm AA guns	• 6 × 533 mm (21 in) TTs (6 × front) • 18 × torpedoes • 1 × 140 mm Naval gun • 4 × 25mm AA guns
Aircraft and facilities		• Catapult and hangar • 1 × Watanabe E9W1 Slim seaplane	• Catapult and hangar • 1 × Yokosuka E14Y2 Glen seaplane	• Catapult and hangar • 2 × Aichi M6A1 Seiran floatplane	• Catapult and hangar • 1 × floatplane

== Bibliography ==
- "Rekishi Gunzō"., History of Pacific War Vol.17 "I-Gō Submarines", Gakken (Japan), January 1998, ISBN 4-05-601767-0
- Rekishi Gunzō, History of Pacific War Vol.63 "Documents of IJN submarines and USN submarines", Gakken (Japan), January 2008, ISBN 978-4-05-605004-2
- Rekishi Gunzō, History of Pacific War Extra, "Perfect guide, The submarines of the Imperial Japanese Forces", Gakken (Japan), March 2005, ISBN 4-05-603890-2
- Model Art Extra No.537, Drawings of Imperial Japanese Naval Vessels Part-3, Model Art Co. Ltd. (Japan), May 1999, Book code 08734–5
- The Maru Special, Japanese Naval Vessels No.13, "Japanese submarines I-13 class and I-400 class", Ushio Shobō (Japan), July 1977, Book code 8343–7
- The Maru Special, Japanese Naval Vessels No.31, "Japanese Submarines I", Ushio Shobō (Japan), September 1979, Book code 68343–31
- Senshi Sōsho Vol.88 Naval armaments and war preparation (2), "And after the outbreak of war", Asagumo Simbun (Japan), October 1975

== See also ==
- Cruiser submarine
