= Temporal Naval Armaments Supplement Programme =

The Temporal Naval Armaments Supplement Programme (マル臨計画, 情勢ニ応ズル軍備欠陥補充, Maru Rin Keikaku, Jōsei ni ouzuru Gunbi-Kekkan Hojū) is one of the armaments expansion plan of the Imperial Japanese Navy (IJN).

== Background ==
In October 1940, the IJN schemed building of the submarines and auxiliary vessels because there was a shortage of them.

== Table of vessels ==
Category	Class	Vessel number(s)	Completed	Converted	Cancelled
Subchaser	No.13	#184 – 194	No.17 (#184) to No.27 (#194)		
Medium-sized submarine	Ro-35	#201 – 209	Ro-35 (#201) to Ro-43 (#209)		
Medium-sized submarine	Ro-100	#210 – 218	Ro-100 (#210) to Ro-108 (#218)		
Combat support ship	Ashizuri	#219 – 220	Ashizuri (#219), Shioya (#220)		
Subchaser	No.13	#221 – 232	No.28 (#221) to No.39 (#232)		
Combat support ship	Sunosaki	#233 – 236	Takasaki (#233)		#234 – 236
Training cruiser	Katori	#237			#237
Motor torpedo boat	No.1	#241 – 246	No.1 (#241) to No.6 (#246)		
Auxiliary minesweeper	Aux. No.1	#251 – 256	Aux. No.1 (#251) to Aux. No.6 (#256)		
Auxiliary minelayer	Aux. No.1	#257 – 260	Aux. No.1 (#257) to Aux. No.4 (#260)		
Food ship	Kinesaki	#261 – 263	Hayasaki (#261), Shirasaki (#262), Arasaki (#263)		

== See also ==
- 1st Naval Armaments Supplement Programme (Maru 1 Keikaku, 1931)
- 2nd Naval Armaments Supplement Programme (Maru 2 Keikaku, 1934)
- 3rd Naval Armaments Supplement Programme (Maru 3 Keikaku, 1937)
- 4th Naval Armaments Supplement Programme (Maru 4 Keikaku, 1939)
- Rapidly Naval Armaments Supplement Programme (Maru Kyū Keikaku, 1941)
- Additional Naval Armaments Supplement Programme (Maru Tui Keikaku, 1941)
- 5th Naval Armaments Supplement Programme (Maru 5 Keikaku, 1941)
- 6th Naval Armaments Supplement Programme (Maru 6 Keikaku, 1942)
- Modified 5th Naval Armaments Supplement Programme (Kai-Maru 5 Keikaku, 1942)
- Wartime Naval Armaments Supplement Programme (Maru Sen Keikaku, 1944)
