= Sokuten-class minelayer (1938) =

Imperial Japanese Navy minelayer

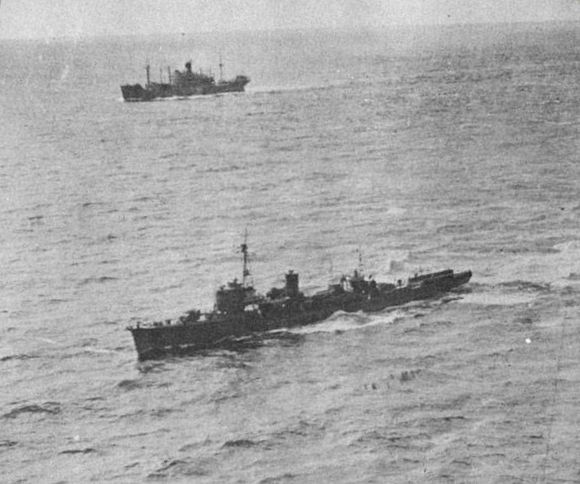
- Sokuten class

Class overview
- Name: Sokuten class
- Builders: Hitachi Zōsen Corporation; Mitsubishi Heavy Industries; Mitsui Engineering & Shipbuilding; Nihon Kōkan Corporation; Ōsaka Iron Works; Tama Shipyards; Tōkyō Ishikawajima Shipyard
- Operators: Imperial Japanese Navy; Republic of China Navy
- Preceded by: Natsushima class
- Succeeded by: Kamishima class
- Subclasses: Sokuten class (Pr. H11); Hirashima class (Pr. H11B); Ajiro class
- Cost: 2,540,064 JPY in 1937; 2,943,000 JPY in 1939; 4,334,400 JPY in 1941; 4,487,000 JPY in 1942
- Built: 1937–1944
- In commission: 1938–1960
- Planned: 41
- Completed: 15
- Canceled: 26
- Lost: 12
- Retired: 3
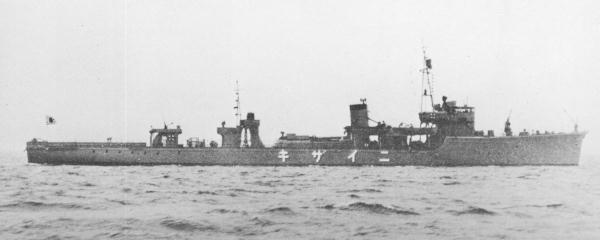
- Hirashima class Niizaki on 31 August 1942

General characteristics
- Type: Minelayer/Netlayer
- Displacement: 720 long tons (732 t) standard
- Length: 74.70 m (245 ft 1 in) overall
- Beam: 7.85 m (25 ft 9 in)
- Draught: Sokuten class; 2.60 m (8 ft 6 in); Hirashima class and Ajiro class; 2.62 m (8 ft 7 in)
- Propulsion: 2 × MAN Mk.3 Model 10 diesels, 2 shafts, 3,600 bhp
- Speed: 20.0 knots (37.0 km/h; 23.0 mph)
- Range: Nuwajima, 1943; approx. 4,000 nmi (7,400 km; 4,600 mi) at 14 kn (26 km/h; 16 mph); all others; 2,000 nmi (3,700 km; 2,300 mi) at 14 kn (26 km/h; 16 mph)
- Complement: Sokuten class and Ajiro class; 74; Hirashima class; 67
- Armament: Sokuten class; 2 × 40 mm heavy machine guns; 2 × Type 93 13 mm AA guns; 36 × Type 95 depth charges; 1 × Type 94 depth charge projector; 10 × depth charge throwers; 1 × Type 93 active sonar; 1 × Type 93 hydrophone; 120 × Type 93 naval mines or 2 × Type 96 510 m (1,673 ft 3 in) anti-submarine nets or 8 × 502.5 m (1,648 ft 7 in) capture nets; Hirashima class and Ajiro class; 1 × 76.2 mm (3.00 in) L/40 AA gun; 2 × Type 93 13 mm AA guns; 36 × Type 95 depth charges; 1 × Type 94 depth charge projector; 10 × depth charge throwers; 1 × Type 93 active sonar; 1 × Type 93 hydrophone; 120 × Type 93 naval mines or 2 × Type 96 510 m anti-submarine nets or 8 × 502.5 m capture nets

The Sokuten-class minelayer (測天型敷設艇,, Sokuten-gata Fusetsutei) was a class of minelayers of the Imperial Japanese Navy (IJN), serving during and after World War II. The class consists of three subclasses, which this article handles collectively.

== Background ==
- In 1937, the IJN planned this class as a replacement for the timeworn Natsushima and the Sokuten-class auxiliary minelayer.

== Ships in classes ==
=== Sokuten class ===
- Project number H11. Original model of the Sokuten class. Five vessels were built in 1937–40 under the Maru 3 Programme (Ship # 57–61).

Ship #	Ship	Builder	Laid down	Launched	Completed	Fate
57	Sokuten (測天)	Mitsubishi, Yokohama Shipyard	24-06-1937	27-04-1938	28-12-1938	Sunk by aircraft at Palau, 25-07-1944.
58	Shirakami (白神)	Tōkyō Ishikawajima Shipyard	03-09-1937	25-06-1938	25-04-1939	Clashed with Army troop transport and sunk off Urup, 03-03-1944.
59	Naryū (成生)	Mitsubishi, Yokohama Shipyard	24-03-1939	28-08-1939	20-06-1940	Sunk by USS Sennet off Kii Peninsula 32°10′N 135°58′E, 16-02-1945.
60	Kyosai (巨済)	Tōkyō Ishikawajima Shipyard	22-06-1938	29-06-1939	27-12-1939	Decommissioned on 05-09-1945. Surrendered to United Kingdom on 20-11-1947. Scrapped on 31-03-1948.
61	Ukishima (浮島)	Tōkyō Ishikawajima Shipyard	28-07-1939	09-12-1939	31-10-1940	Sunk by unknown submarine off Hatsushima, 16-11-1943.

=== Hirashima class ===
- Project number H11B. Second production model of the Sokuten-class. Nine vessels were built in 1939–43 under the Maru 4 Programme (Ship # 170–178). They were equipped with a 76.2 mm anti-aircraft gun. The Nuwajima had its ballast tank replaced with a fuel tank for convoy escort operations. These nine vessels were classed in the Sokuten-class in the IJN official documents.

Ship #	Ship	Builder	Laid down	Launched	Completed	Fate
170	Hirashima (平島)	Mitsubishi, Yokohama Shipyard	06-09-1939	06-06-1940	24-12-1940	Sunk by USS Sawfish at west of Gotō Islands, 27-07-1943.
171	Hōko (澎湖)	Tama Shipyards	07-11-1940	08-09-1941	20-12-1941	Sunk by aircraft off Buka Island, 28-09-1943.
172	Ishizaki (石埼)	Mitsubishi, Yokohama Shipyard	10-03-1941	13-08-1941	28-02-1942	Decommissioned on 30-11-1945. Surrendered to United States on 01-10-1947. Sunk as target at 35°40′N 122°53′E on 16-10-1947.
173	Takashima (鷹島)	Nihon Kōkan, Tsurumi Shipyard	11-12-1940	18-10-1941	25-03-1942	Sunk by aircraft at Okinawa Island, 10-10-1944.
174	Saishū (済州)	Ōsaka Iron Works, Sakurajima Factory	15-01-1941	15-11-1941	25-04-1942	Decommissioned on 22-10-1945. Surrendered to Republic of China on 03-10-1947, and renamed Yungtsin (PF-75). Decommissioned on 01-05-1960.
175	Niizaki (新井埼)	Mitsui, Tamano Shipyard	12-07-1941	02-03-1942	31-08-1942	Struck a naval mine at Muroran on 04-10-1945. Decommissioned on 05-10-1945. Scrapped 1947.
176	Yurijima (由利島)	Nihon Kōkan, Tsurumi Shipyard	31-10-1941	04-07-1942	25-11-1942	Sunk by USS Cobia off Kota Bharu, 14-01-1945.
177	Nuwajima (怒和島)	Ōsaka Iron Works, Sakurajima Factory	26-11-1941	31-07-1942	15-11-1942	Heavy damaged by aircraft at Saiki, 30-04-1945. Later sank in shallow water. Salvaged and scrapped on 01-09-1948.
178	Maeshima (前島)	Nihon Kōkan, Tsurumi Shipyard	20-07-1942	18-04-1943	31-07-1943	Sunk by aircraft at Laoag City, 21-10-1944.
179	Moroshima (諸島)	Hitachi Zōsen				Cancelled on 11 August 1943.

=== Ajiro class ===
- Project number H13 at first. The IJN hoped urgent building for her. The Navy Technical Department revised the Hirashima drawings. Twenty-six vessels were planned under the Maru Kyū Programme (Ship # 460–473, 14 vessels) and the Kai-Maru 5 Programme (Ship # 5421–5432, 12 vessels), but only Ajiro was completed. The Ajiro-class were classified separately from the Sokuten-class in the IJN official documents.

Ship #	Ship	Builder	Laid down	Launched	Completed	Fate
460	Ajiro (網代)	Hitachi Zōsen, Innoshima Shipyard	06-09-1943	08-04-1944	31-07-1944	Sunk by USS Snapper at northwest of Chichi-jima, 01-10-1944.
461–473	Futtsu (富津); Hamizaki (波見埼); Hikoshima (彦島); Himeshima (姫島); Kamishima (神島); Kyobun (巨文); Musō (無双); Niijima (新島); Shinoshima (篠島); Sugashima (菅島); Tateshima (立島); Terajima (寺島); Torai (虎井)					Cancelled on 11 August 1943.
5421–5432	Arashima (荒島); Awashima (粟島); Hayashima (早島); Hosojima (細島); Kurushima (来島); Makishima (牧島); Michishima (満島); Mishima (見島); Ōshima (大島); Toshima (利島); Tobishima (飛島); Tsunoshima (角島)					Cancelled on 5 May 1944.

== Bibliography ==
- "Rekishi Gunzō"., History of Pacific War Vol.51, The truth histories of the Imperial Japanese Vessels Part.2, Gakken (Japan), June 2002, ISBN 4-05-602780-3
- Ships of the World special issue Vol.45, Escort Vessels of the Imperial Japanese Navy, "Kaijinsha"., (Japan), February 1996
- Model Art Extra No.340, Drawings of Imperial Japanese Naval Vessels Part-1, "Model Art Co. Ltd". Archived from the original on 2012-06-05. (Japan), October 1989
- The Maru Special, Japanese Naval Vessels No.47, Japanese naval mine warfare crafts, "Ushio Shobō". (Japan), January 1981
- Daiji Katagiri, Ship Name Chronicles of the Imperial Japanese Navy Combined Fleet, Kōjinsha (Japan), June 1988, ISBN 4-7698-0386-9
- Senshi Sōsho Vol.31, Naval armaments and war preparation (1), "Until November 1941", Asagumo Simbun (Japan), November 1969
- Senshi Sōsho Vol.88, Naval armaments and war preparation (2), "And after the outbreak of war", Asagumo Simbun (Japan), October 1975
