= No.1-class minelayer =

Class of minelayers of the Imperial Japanese Navy (IJN)

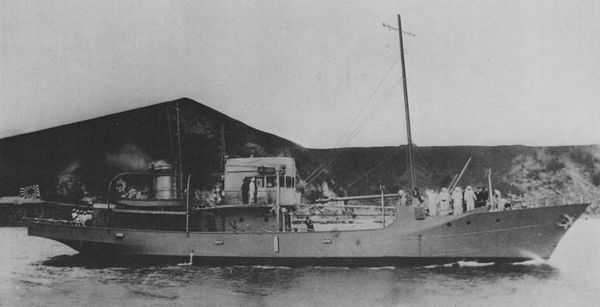
- Auxiliary Minelayer No.1 on 28 February 1942

Class overview
- Name: No.1 class auxiliary minelayer
- Builders: Uraga Dock Company
- Operators: Imperial Japanese Navy
- Preceded by: Sokuten-class
- Built: 1941–1942
- In commission: 1942–1947
- Planned: 4
- Completed: 4
- Lost: 3
- Retired: 1

General characteristics
- Type: Minelayer
- Displacement: 215 long tons (218 t) standard
- Length: 35.11 m (115 ft 2 in) overall
- Beam: 6.16 m (20 ft 3 in)
- Draught: 2.38 m (7 ft 10 in)
- Propulsion: 1 × low-speed diesel; single shaft, 400 bhp
- Speed: 9.5 knots (10.9 mph; 17.6 km/h)
- Range: 1,500 nmi (2,800 km) at 9.5 kn (10.9 mph; 17.6 km/h)
- Complement: 63
- Armament: 1 × 76.2 mm (3.00 in) L/40 AA gun; 2 × 13 mm AA guns; 40 × Type 93 naval mines or 16 × depth charges

The No.1 class auxiliary minelayer (第一号型敷設特務艇,, Dai Ichi Gō-gata Fusetsu-Tokumutei) was a class of minelayers of the Imperial Japanese Navy (IJN), serving during World War II. They were built to supplement the timeworn Sokuten-class. 4 vessels were built in 1941–42 under the Maru Rin Programme (Ship # 257–260).

== Background ==
- In 1939, the Sokuten-class was the main minelayer of the local guard districts. However, they were too old. The IJN wanted new small minelayers for local guard districts.
- In 1940, the IJN found out a handy boat. It was a standard longline fishing ship Sōyō Maru (160 tons) by the Ministry of Agriculture, Forestry. The IJN made a model of it and completed a design of new small minelayer. Uraga Dock Company built all of the vessels.

== Ships in class ==
Ship #	Ship	Laid down	Launched	Completed	Fate
257	Auxiliary minelayer No. 1 ex-Minelayer No. 1	4 June 1941	20 August 1941	28 February 1942 as Minelayer No. 1	Renamed Auxiliary minelayer No. 1 on 1 February 1944, struck a naval mine and sunk off Medan on 27 March 1945, decommissioned on 3 May 1947.
258	Minelayer No. 2	4 June 1941	30 August 1941	10 April 1942	Struck a naval mine and sunk off Surabaya on 31 December 1942, decommissioned on 20 March 1943.
259	Auxiliary minelayer No. 3 ex-Minelayer No. 3	8 September 1941	14 January 1942	30 June 1942 as Minelayer No. 3	Renamed Auxiliary minelayer No. 3 on 1 February 1944, survived war at Chuuk, decommissioned on 3 May 1947.
260	Auxiliary minelayer No. 4 ex-Minelayer No. 4	8 September 1941	24 January 1942	20 August 1942 as Minelayer No. 4	Renamed Auxiliary minelayer No. 4 on 1 February 1944, sunk by HMS Tally-Ho off Car Nicobar on 20 November 1944, decommissioned on 3 May 1947.

== Photos ==
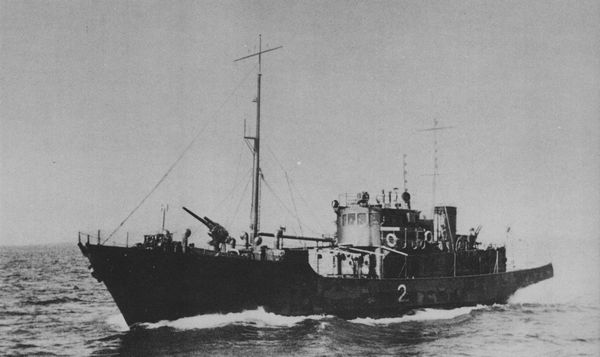
Minelayer No.2 on 7 April 1942

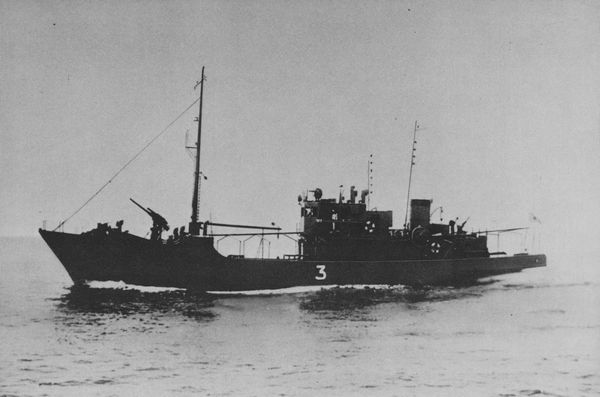
Auxiliary Minelayer No.3 in 1942

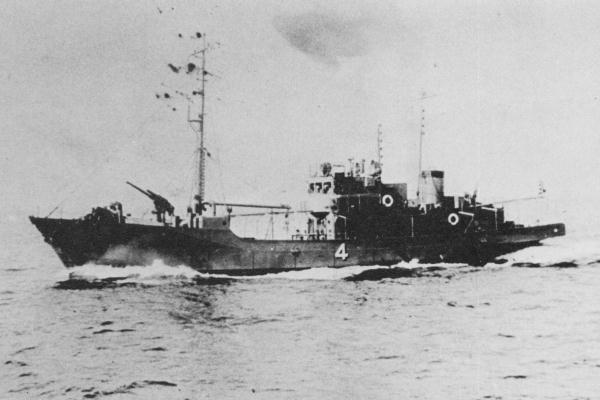
Auxiliary Minelayer No.4 in 1942

== Bibliography ==
- Ships of the World special issue Vol.45, Escort Vessels of the Imperial Japanese Navy, "Kaijinsha"., (Japan), February 1996
- The Maru Special, Japanese Naval Vessels No.47, Japanese naval mine warfare crafts, "Ushio Shobō". (Japan), January 1981
