= Ashizuri =

Ashizuri may refer to:

- Ashizuri (train), a train service in Japan
- Cape Ashizuri, the southernmost point of the island of Shikoku, Japan
- Ashizuri-Uwakai National Park, a national park at the southwestern tip of the island of Shikoku, Japan
- Ashizuri Suizokukan, a manga by panpanya
- Ashizuri-class combat support ship, a class of Imperial Japanese Navy support ships of World War II
- 4399 Ashizuri, a main-belt asteroid
