= Japanese minelayer Natsushima =

Two Japanese warships have borne the name Natsushima:

- Japanese minelayer Natsushima (1911), a Sokuten-class auxiliary minelayer launched in 1911 and sold in 1927
- Japanese minelayer Natsushima (1933), a Natsushima-class minelayer launched in 1933 and sunk in 1944
