= Kamishima-class minelayer =

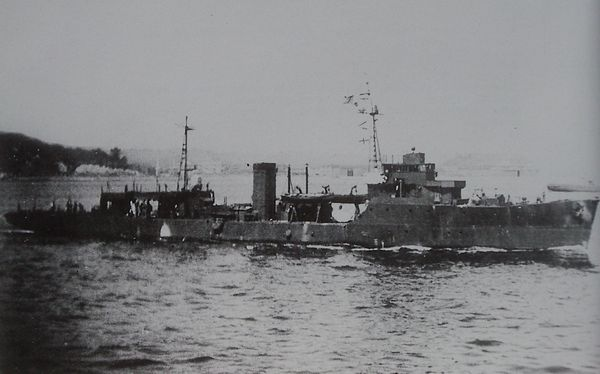
- Kamishima in 1947

Class overview
- Name: Kamishima class
- Builders: Sasebo Naval Arsenal; Kawanami Kōgyō Corporation
- Operators: Imperial Japanese Navy; Soviet Navy
- Preceded by: Ajiro class
- Built: 1945–1946
- In commission: 1945–1947
- Planned: 9
- Completed: 2
- Canceled: 7
- Retired: 2

General characteristics
- Type: Minelayer
- Displacement: 766 long tons (778 t) standard
- Length: 74.50 m (244 ft 5 in) overall
- Beam: 7.85 m (25 ft 9 in)
- Draught: 2.60 m (8 ft 6 in)
- Propulsion: Kamishima; 2 × Kampon Mk.23B Model 8 diesels, 2 shafts, 1,900 bhp (1,400 kW); Awashima; 2 × MAN Mk.3 Model 10 diesels, 2 shafts, 3,600 bhp (2,700 kW)
- Speed: Kamishima; 16.5 knots (30.6 km/h; 19.0 mph); Awashima; 19.5 knots (36.1 km/h; 22.4 mph)
- Range: Kamishima; 3,000 nmi (5,600 km; 3,500 mi) at 14 kn (26 km/h; 16 mph)
- Complement: Kamishima; 94
- Armament: Kamishima, 1945; 2 × Type 5 40 mm L/65 AA guns; 16 × Type 96 25 mm AA guns; 36 × Type 2 depth charges; 120 × Type 93 naval mines; 4 × Type 3 depth charge projectors; 8 × depth charge throwers; 1 × 22-Gō surface search radar; 1 × 13-Gō early warning radar; 2 × Type 3 active sonars; 1 × Type 93 hydrophone; 1 × Paravane

The Kamishima-class minelayer (神島型敷設艇,, Kamishima-gata Fusetsutei) was a class of minelayers of the Imperial Japanese Navy (IJN), serving during and after World War II. Nine vessels were planned under the Maru Sen Programme; however, only one vessel was completed by the end of war.

== Background ==
By the end of 1944, Japanese sea lanes were cut apart by United States Navy. The IJN focused on securing the Sea of Japan. Therefore, the IJN had to lay naval mines in La Pérouse Strait, Tsugaru Strait, and Tsushima Strait. However, the IJN had already lost all of its minelayers. The IJN planned to build two kinds of minelayers. One was the large Minoo class; the other was the smaller Kamishima class.

== Design ==
The Navy Technical Department (Kampon) revised the Hirashima's drawings, and gave it the armaments intended for escort ships (or kaibōkan). Their Type 5 40 mm AA was the latest anti-aircraft gun in the Imperial Japanese Army and Navy. It was a Japanese version of the Bofors 40 mm.

== Ships in class ==
Ship #	Ship	Builder	Laid down	Launched	Completed	Fate
1801	Kamishima (神島)	Sasebo Naval Arsenal	20 February 1945	12 June 1945	30 July 1945	Decommissioned 5 September 1945. Surrendered to Soviet Union at Nakhodka, 3 October 1947.
1802	Awashima (粟島)	Sasebo Naval Arsenal	20 February 1945	26 July 1945	18 April 1946	Incomplete until the end of the war (90%). Surrendered to United States on 1 October 1947. Sunk as target at 35°24′N 123°53′E on 7 October 1947.
1803 - 1806						Cancelled in May 1945.
1807	Hikoshima (彦島)	Sasebo Naval Arsenal				Cancelled in May 1945.
1808 - 1809						Cancelled in May 1945.

== Bibliography ==
- "Rekishi Gunzō"., History of Pacific War Vol.51, The truth histories of the Imperial Japanese Vessels Part.2, Gakken (Japan), June 2002, ISBN 4-05-602780-3
- Ships of the World special issue Vol.45, Escort Vessels of the Imperial Japanese Navy, "Kaijinsha"., (Japan), February 1996
- The Maru Special, Japanese Naval Vessels No.47, Japanese naval mine warfare crafts, "Ushio Shobō". (Japan), January 1981
- Daiji Katagiri, Ship Name Chronicles of the Imperial Japanese Navy Combined Fleet, Kōjinsha (Japan), June 1988, ISBN 4-7698-0386-9

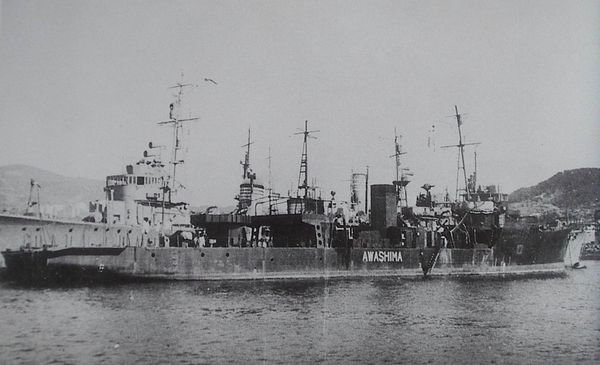
Awashima in 1947
