= Japanese minelayer Kamishima =

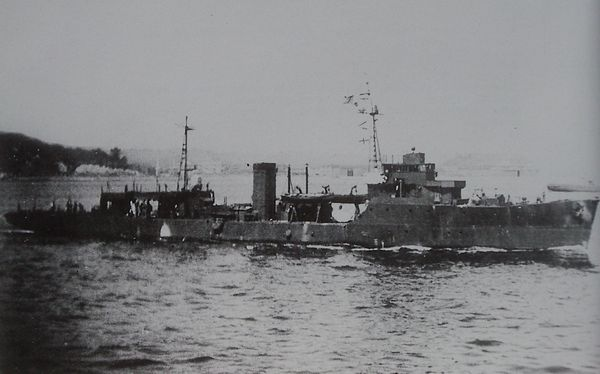
- Kamishima in 1947 at Yokosuka

History

Japan
- Name: Kamishima
- Ordered: fiscal 1945
- Builder: Sasebo Naval Arsenal
- Laid down: February 20, 1945
- Launched: June 12, 1945
- Commissioned: July 30, 1945
- Stricken: September 15, 1945
- Fate: Ceded to Soviet Union, October 3, 1947

General characteristics
- Type: minelayer
- Displacement: 766 long tons (778 t) standard, 787 tons normal
- Length: 69.5 m (228 ft) pp, 73.3 m (240 ft) waterline
- Beam: 7.85 m (25 ft 9 in)
- Draught: 2.6 m (8 ft 6 in)
- Propulsion: 2-shaft diesel engine, 2 boilers, 1,900 hp (1,400 kW)
- Speed: 16.5 knots (19.0 mph; 30.6 km/h)
- Range: 3,000 nmi (5,600 km) at 14 knots
- Complement: 94
- Armament: 2xType 5 4cm AA guns, 13x Type 96 25 mm AT/AA Gun, 120 naval mines, 36 depth charges
- Armour: none

Kamishima (神島) was a small minelayer of the Imperial Japanese Navy, which was in service during the final stages of World War II. She was named after Kamishima Island, a small island in Mie Prefecture, offshore Toba, Mie. She was the lead ship of the two-vessel Kamishima-class.

== Building ==
During the very final stages of World War II, in preparation for the anticipated Allied invasion of the Japanese home islands, the Imperial Japanese Navy saw the need to block the entrances to the Sea of Japan to protect Japan's relatively lightly defended western coast. However, as almost all minelayers had been sunk by that time, an emergency program was begun to construct several small vessels for this task. Kamishima was launched by the Sasebo Naval Arsenal on June 12, 1945, and was commissioned into service on July 30, 1945.

== Operational history ==
On completion, Kamishima was assigned to the Sasebo Naval District, but the surrender of Japan occurred only 15 days after her commissioning. She was removed from the navy list on September 15, 1945. From September 1945 through June 1947, Kamishima was used as a repatriation vessel, shuttling between ports in Korea and Shanghai, and Kyushu, returning demobilized Japanese troops and civilians. On October 3, 1947, the American occupation forces turned Kamishima over to the Soviet Union as war reparations at the port of Nakhodka, where she was subsequently commissioned into the Soviet Navy's Pacific Fleet and transferred to Vladivostok in October.

She was converted at Nikolayevsk-on-Amur port into a hydrography vessel Katun (Катунь). 74.5x7.8x2.6meters. 2x950h.p. 16.5knots. Range - 5000 miles. From year 1954 - boilership. Deleted from TO&E in 1956.

In 1955, when the Soviet Navy ended its lease of Port Arthur, the Soviet gifted Kamishima and two other former IJN escort ships to China. Kamishima served under Chinese flag using the name 'Minelayer No. 50'. It was eventually sold for scrap in the early 1980s.

== Bibliography ==
- Brown, David (1990). Warship Losses of World War Two. Naval Institute Press. ISBN 1-55750-914-X.
- Howarth, Stephen (1983). The Fighting Ships of the Rising Sun: The Drama of the Imperial Japanese Navy, 1895-1945. Atheneum. ISBN 0-689-11402-8.
- Jentsura, Hansgeorg (1976). Warships of the Imperial Japanese Navy, 1869-1945. US Naval Institute Press. ISBN 0-87021-893-X.
- Watts, Anthony J (1967). Japanese Warships of World War II. Doubleday. ISBN 978-0-3850-9189-3.
