= USS Argus (PY-14) =

U.S. Navy ship

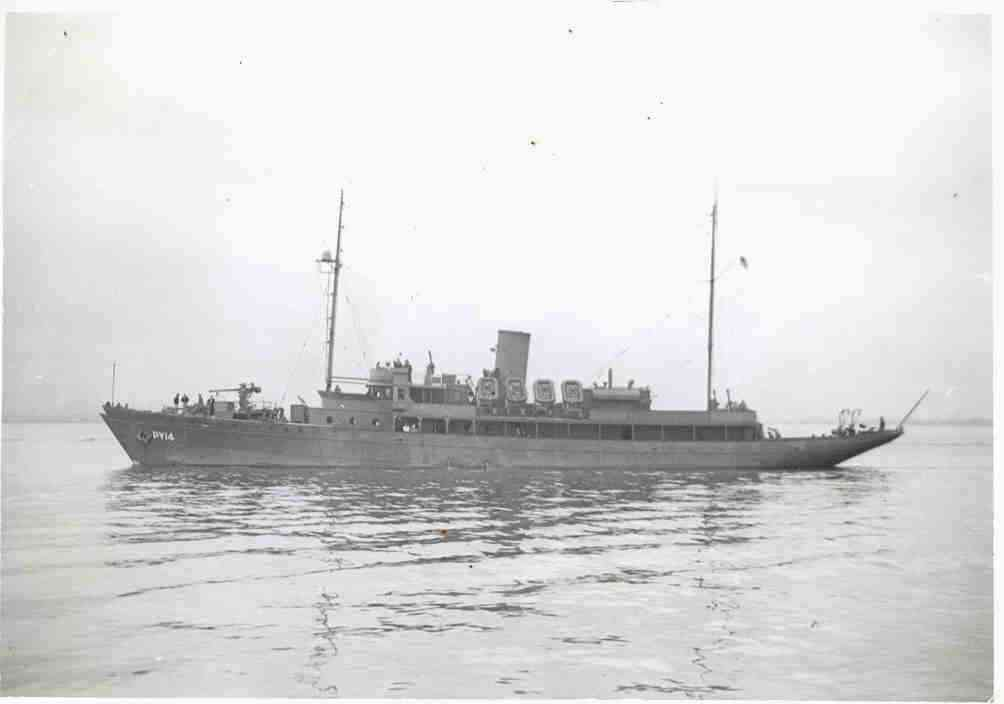
- USS Argus (PY-14), at sea, circa 1944/1945.

History

United States
- Name: Haida
- Namesake: Haida people
- Builder: Germaniawerft, Kiel
- Completed: 1929
- Fate: Acquired by the Navy, 25 October 1940

United States
- Name: Argus
- Namesake: Argus Panoptes
- Acquired: 25 October 1940
- Commissioned: 13 February 1941
- Decommissioned: 15 April 1946
- Stricken: 21 May 1946
- Identification: Hull symbol: PY-14; IMO number: 8981652; Code letters: NCIA; MMSI number: 319080000
- Fate: Transferred to the Maritime Commission, 30 October 1946; Sold into private market
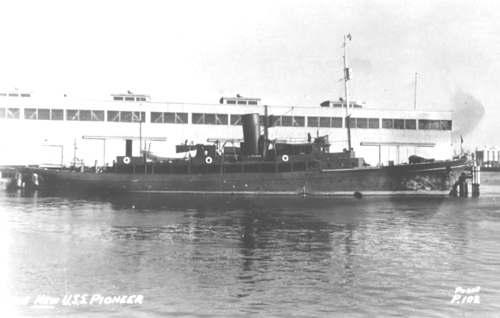
- Pioneer

United States
- Name: Pioneer
- Operator: United States Coast and Geodetic Survey
- In service: 17 September 1941
- Out of service: 16 March 1942

General characteristics
- Type: Yacht
- Displacement: 859 long tons (873 t)
- Length: 207 ft 6 in (63.25 m)
- Beam: 30 ft (9.1 m)
- Draft: 13 ft 5 in (4.09 m)
- Installed power: 2 × Krupp diesel engines; 1,600 shp (1,200 kW)
- Propulsion: 2 × screws
- Speed: 14.5 knots (26.9 km/h; 16.7 mph)
- Complement: 59
- Armament: 1 × 3 in (76 mm)/50 cal dual purpose gun; 2 × depth charge track; 1 × "Y"-gun depth charge projector; 4 × .50 cal (12.7 mm) M2 Browning machine guns

The American motor yacht Haida was built in Germany in 1929 for Max C. Fleischmann and later saw service in the United States Navy during World War II as patrol yacht USS Argus (PY-14) and USC&GS Pioneer. In 1946 she returned to her role as a private yacht under a sequence of names and owners, and after a further refit in 2016 is now Haida 1929.

== Construction and yacht service ==
The motor yacht Haida was built in 1929 at Kiel, Germany by Friedrich Krupp Germaniawerft for Max C. Fleischmann of Santa Barbara, California, the younger son of Charles Fleischmann, founder of the eponymous yeast company of Cincinnati. When his brother Julius died suddenly in 1925, Max assumed management control of the company but did not wish to move from California and his other interests, including yachting, so stood down from that role in 1929. Like several others over the years, the yacht was named for the Haida people, indigenous to Haida Gwaii islands, whose skills as seafarers impressed Fleischmann greatly.

Haida was designed by the eminent New York firm of Cox & Stevens and her keel was laid in 1927. The yacht has a length overall of 66.7 m (218 ft 10 in) and length between perpendiculars of 63.1 m (207 ft 0 in), a beam of 9.1 m (29 ft 10 in), a depth of 5.3 m (17 ft 5 in) and a draft of 3.5 m (11 ft 6 in). She measured 693 GRT. Haida is still powered by her original pair of diesel engines, also made by Krupp, totalling 1,500 hp (1,100 kW), driving twin propellers and giving her a speed of 14.5 knots (26.9 km/h; 16.7 mph). Unusually, Fleischmann chose to have the yacht painted black.

Following completion at Kiel, Haida was delivered, via New York and the Panama Canal to California and her berth at the Santa Barbara Yacht Club (Fleischman had donated over half of the cost of the construction of a breakwater at Santa Barbara). During the following decade the owner cruised extensively in West Coast waters, from Alaska to Mexico, following his interests in marine science and fishing.

== US Navy service ==
The yacht was acquired by the Navy on 25 October 1940 from Mrs. Max C. Fleischmann of Glenbrook, Nevada; converted at Long Beach, California by the Craig Shipbuilding Company for naval service and renamed Argus on 14 November 1940. Named for the Argus (a monster with a hundred eyes supposedly slain by the Greek mythological messenger of the gods, Hermes), she was the second U.S. Navy vessel to bear the name. She was commissioned on 13 February 1941.

Argus arrived in San Francisco on 19 February 1941 and began duty patrolling San Francisco Bay as a unit of the Patrol force, 12th Naval District. That assignment lasted until May 1941, when she was reassigned to what appears to have been a successor organization – Patrol Squadron 1, Local Defense Force, 12th Naval District. Her duty, however, remained substantially the same as before, patrolling San Francisco Bay. She continued to perform this task until decommissioned on 17 September. She was then transferred to the United States Coast and Geodetic Survey.

== United States Coast and Geodetic Survey ==
The Coast and Geodetic Survey modified her for her new role, renamed her Pioneer (their second of that name), and placed her in service on 17 September 1941. Pioneer was able to accomplish little survey work before the entry of the United States into World War II led to her return to the U.S. Navy on 16 March 1942 under Executive Order 9072 of 24 February 1942.

== Return to US Navy ==
Pioneer was returned to the Navy on 16 March 1942 and, after reconversion at the General Engineering & Drydock Company, she was recommissioned at San Francisco on 18 April, again as Argus. The converted yacht resumed her patrols of San Francisco Bay under the auspices of the Commandant, 12th Naval District, and continued that duty for the remainder of her naval career. There were two notable events during her wartime career. The first occurred when Argus rescued the 60 survivors from the Liberty ship John A. Johnson, which had been torpedoed and sunk by the Japanese submarine I-12 on 30 October 1944. I-12, after ramming and sinking the lifeboats and rafts, had then machine-gunned the 70 survivors in the water, killing 10. A Pan American Airways plane spotted John A. Johnson's remaining crew soon thereafter, and Argus recovered them at 21:35 on 30 October. She disembarked them at San Francisco on 3 November. Ardent and Rockford then teamed up to sink I-12 ten days later.

In the second event, Argus participated in the establishment of a weather station on the uninhabited French Clipperton Island, 670 mi (1,080 km) southwest of Acapulco, Mexico. Departing San Francisco on 4 December 1944 with meteorological personnel embarked, the converted yacht reached the island a week later and landed her passengers. With the American colors hoisted over the island, the naval weather station was set up that day, supported at the outset by Argus (the Americans withdrew in 1945).

The yacht was decommissioned at San Francisco on 15 April 1946. Her name was struck from the Naval Vessel Register on 21 May, and she was transferred to the Maritime Commission on 30 October for disposal.

== Further yacht service ==
The yacht was sold in late 1946 to Egyptian cotton magnate Maurice Ada (or Adda) and renamed Sarina. Now painted in traditional white, she was based at the Alexandria Yacht Club. A close friend of King Farouk, when he was deposed and exiled in 1952 the yacht was moved to Cannes, France.

In the late 1960s Sarina was briefly owned by Larry Green, an American businessman involved in the motor trade, and was then sold to former British Member of Parliament Loel Guinness in 1969. His membership of the Royal Yacht Squadron entitled the yacht to fly the White Ensign when he was aboard. Guinness owned her a decade, systematically restoring and enhancing her each winter, while cruising in the Mediterranean in the summers. In 1979 in declining health he sold Sarina to the Australian music entrepreneur and film producer Robert Stigwood. He installed satellite communications, concealing the dome in a new additional false funnel. After two years, after extensive cruising throughout Europe and the Caribbean, Stigwood sold Sarina (without the dummy funnel) to a British-resident American art collector, Stanley J. Seeger, who renamed her Rosenkavalier.

In 1988 Rosenkavalier was sold to the three brothers Hiroshi, Takashi and Yasushi Isaka, owners of a property development company in Yokohama, Japan. She received a major refit in Thailand during 1991 and was sold the following year to Greek-Cypriot, Andreas Liveras, already established in the yacht charter business. A Swiss-based businessman bought the yacht in 1999, renamed her Haida G, and set about another major restoration in France and Turkey, including a complete refit of the original Krupp diesel engines.

In 2011 Haida G was again sold and renamed Dona Amelia. She received a further extensive refit at Pendennis Shipyard in Falmouth, Cornwall in 2016/2017, after which she was renamed Haida 1929 by her new owner. Her tonnage is assessed as 720 GT and 216 NT.
