= Additional Naval Armaments Supplement Programme =

The Additional Naval Armaments Supplement Programme (マル追計画, 追加計画, Maru Tsui Keikaku, Tsuika Keikaku) was one of the naval expansion plans of the Imperial Japanese Navy (IJN).

== Background ==
The Maru Tsui Keikaku or Tsuika Keikaku was ordered as a supplement to the 1941 Rapid Naval Armaments Supplement Programme (or Circle Rapid Plan, Maru Kyū Keikaku) due to the forthcoming Japanese entry into the Second World War.

In November 1941, the IJN required many additional submarines for the Pacific War, as a pressing matter. To meet this need, the IJN negotiated with the Ministry of Finance and received approval for 32 submarines and one target ship. Later, they were concluded by 78th, 79th and 81st Imperial Diet.

== Table of vessels ==
Category	Class	Vessel number(s)	Completed	Converted	Cancelled
Cruiser submarine Type-A	I-12	#620, #621	I-12 (#620)	#621 was converted to the I-13 class	
Cruiser submarine Type-A	I-13		I-13 (#621)		
Cruiser submarine Type-B	I-54	#627, #629, #631, #633 - 636	I-54 (#627), I-56 (#629), I-58 (#631)		#633 - 636
Cruiser submarine Type-C	I-52	#625, #626, #628, #630, #632	I-52 (#625), I-53 (#626), I-55 (#628)		#630, #632
Medium-sized submarine	Ro-35	#640 - 654	Ro-56 (#645)		#640 - 644, #646 - 654
Tanker submarine	I-351	#655 - 657	I-351 (#655)		#657
Target ship	Hakachi	#660	Hakachi (#660)		

== See also ==
- 1st Naval Armaments Supplement Programme (Maru 1 Keikaku, 1931)
- 2nd Naval Armaments Supplement Programme (Maru 2 Keikaku, 1934)
- 3rd Naval Armaments Supplement Programme (Maru 3 Keikaku, 1937)
- 4th Naval Armaments Supplement Programme (Maru 4 Keikaku, 1939)
- Temporal Naval Armaments Supplement Programme (Maru Rin Keikaku, 1940)
- Rapidly Naval Armaments Supplement Programme (Maru Kyū Keikaku, 1941)
- 5th Naval Armaments Supplement Programme (Maru 5 Keikaku, 1941)
- 6th Naval Armaments Supplement Programme (Maru 6 Keikaku, 1942)
- Modified 5th Naval Armaments Supplement Programme (Kai-Maru 5 Keikaku, 1942)
- Wartime Naval Armaments Supplement Programme (Maru Sen Keikaku, 1944)
