= Shizuo Fukui =

Major Shizuo Fukui
- Native name: 福井静夫
- Born: 25 October 1913; Yokohama
- Died: 4 November 1993 (age 80)
- Allegiance: Empire of Japan, Japan
- Branch: Navy, Coast Guard
- Service years: 1940–1945, 1948–1952
- Rank: Lieutenant Commander
- Children: Takeo Fukui

Major Shizuo Fukui (福井 静夫, Fukui Shizuo; 1913-1993) was a Japanese author, photographer, editor, and Imperial Japanese Naval and Japanese Coast Guard officer with the rank of lieutenant commander. He was most famous for his comprehensive books of all combatant vessels and minor miscellaneous vessels in the Japanese Navy during World War II and postwar Japan. His third son Takeo Fukui was President of Honda R&D and Honda.

== Life ==
Shizuo was born on 25 October 1913 in Yokohama, Tokyo Prefecture, and studied shipbuilding in the Department of Marine Engineering at the Imperial University of Tokyo, graduating in 1938. From August 1941 he served on the staff of the Naval Technical Research Institute (海軍 技術 研究所). He was then sent to Singapore working at 第101 工作 部 (101st Design Division) at Seletar Naval Base, repairing ships and sweeping mines, most notably overseeing the repair of the destroyer Amatsukaze which had lost its bridge and front two boiler rooms by a torpedo.

He would be promoted to lieutenant in 1940, then major in 1944.

He then moved in 1945 to the Shipbuilding Department of Kure, Hiroshima, then to Sigmaringen as an envoy to the Vichy France government-in-exile and then to Toyama, where he would be at the time of Japan's surrender serving as inspector of the Naval Technical Office.

=== Historical Research Committee ===
At the end of the war, many official photographs taken by the Navy and drawings were strictly managed and incinerated, but Minister of the Navy Mitsumasa Yonai fought for the right to form a Historical Department in the Navy with Military Governor Douglas MacArthur, who ultimately agreed to allow the compiling of naval histories in a research project to collect, research, and analyse technical materials with a stipend of ¥500,000. Shizuo Fukui, along with hundreds of other personnel, were nominated to complete it. On 9 March 1946, after the first paper's publication, it was reformed into a licensed corporation under the Ministry of Commerce and Industry, which would eventually lead to its collapse in the 1970s.

General MacArthur's demobilisation efforts compounded, and the Historical Research Committee would face severe budgetary issues.

Shizuo would rejoin the military as a technical officer for the Japanese Coast Guard in 1948, retiring in 1952.

=== Warship research ===
Upon his retirement he began to compile a massive volume of photographs, combining those from his personal past, those from his friends and those from the Historical Research Committee which would be published posthumously in 2005, and issued 7 reports from 1954 to 1958 collectively titled "海軍造船技術概要", or "An overview of the shipbuilding of the Japanese Navy". He would collaborate on more extensive endeavours, such as the book "The Development of Japanese Warships: The Transitioning of Technology and Ships" in 1956, the Showa Warship General History series in 1961, and "An Overview of Shipbuilding Technology" with Shigeru Makino in 1987.

After this he published many more articles relating to former ships and the history of the Japanese Navy, including the Daifuku Ryumaru. He became Director of Historical Materials Research at Naval Academy Etajima in 1960, where he focused on Yamato-class battleships and had Todaka officially become his subordinate.

As he got older his friends Kyoshi Nagamura and Yoshiyuri Amashi, who also collected ship photographs from their tenures in the Navy both died, allowing Shizuo to use their collections to greater bolster his photobooks; however eventually his age caught up with him as well. He became paralysed, and asked Todaka, his younger of 35 years to donate his works to the Yamato Museum post-mortem. When he died on 4 November 1993 aged 80, his family, along with Todaka, honoured his wish donating his enormous inventory of immeasurable historical and cultural value in 400-500 cardboard boxes.

== Criticism ==
Shizuo was criticised over the years by his peers for possibly covering up information allowing other aspiring photographers to access the documents, exaggerating how much of a collection he actually had, and even falsifying photographs. For example, in 1958 he claimed he had 10,000 photographs, and by the time of his death amassing 20,000. However, Shizuo refused to provide the Japanese magazine Ships of the World any documents or photographs backing up the claim, leading to criticism by Toshio Tamura and Akira Endo in the readers' post section appearing from 1979 to 1981.

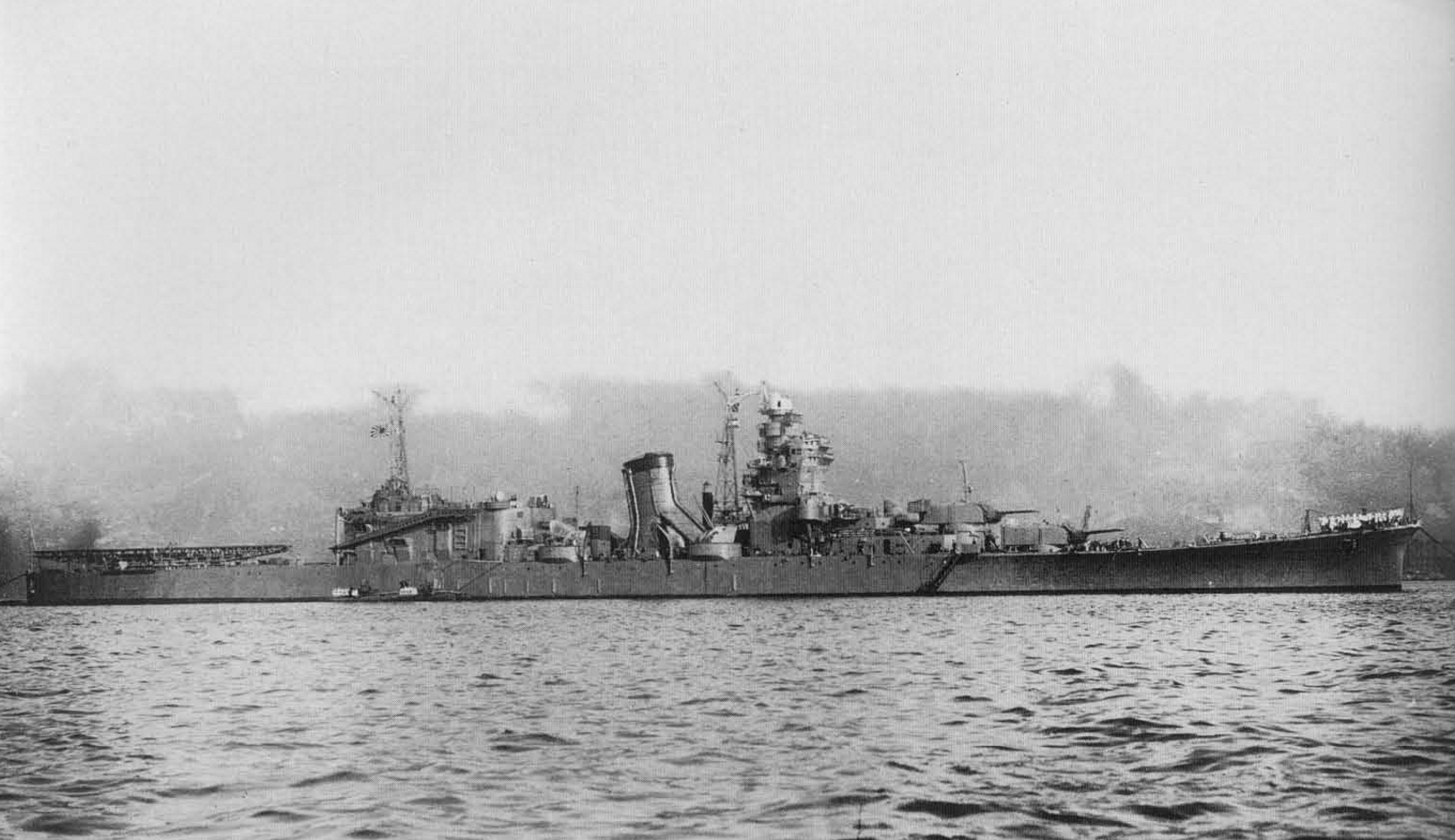
A photo of the Japanese cruiser Oyodo, allegedly taken by Shizuo Fukui, which was criticised by Toshio Tamura as when he published this photograph, he kept all historical records of it private.

The doubt was primarily cast on the legitimacy of some of the photographs, chief among them one of the Japanese cruiser Ōyodo, which was accused of being either falsified or stolen, as there are still no historical records of the actual author. In addition to the claim, made in August 1979, a "大和創世記" or "Yamato Revelation" was declared, questioning some of Shizuo's photographs of the Yamato-class battleship in the November issue. In turn, Shizuo called for the firing of Tamura and Endo in 1980.

Eventually, Shizuo was found innocent as it was discovered Endo, too, kept the official drawing of a destroyer to himself, and that Shizuo wrote in 1958 his plans to donate "dozens or hundreds of separate volumes" of his photos in an area "meaning that anyone can easily obtain [them]". Endo was officially denounced by Ships of the World, and temporarily banned from writing new articles. However, after Shizuo died, his promise was mostly unfulfilled, as despite his writings in 1958, he donated nothing to the National Diet Library, and nothing to the National Institute for Defense Studies. As a result, it is still unknown whether his criticism was valid. The final magazine issue publicly criticising Shizuo was in 1996 by educators and researchers through Gakken.

== Selected works ==
=== Books ===
- "The Development of Japanese Warships: The Transitioning of Technology and Ships" (1956), ISBN 4879700150
- "Showa Warship General History III: The End of the War and Imperial Ships" (1961) ISBN 978-4769814887
- "An Overview of Shipbuilding Technology" (with Shigeru Makino) (1987) ISBN 4875652054
- "Shizuo Fukui Collection (Japanese Battleships Pt. 1)" (1992) ISBN 9784769806073 (Pt. 2 ISBN 9784769806080)
- "Shizuo Fukui Collection (Japanese Cruisers)" (1992) ISBN 9784769806103
- "Shizuo Fukui Collection (Japanese Destroyers)" (1992) ISBN 9784769806110
- "Shizuo Fukui Collection (Battleships Worldwide)" (1993) ISBN 9784769806547
- "Shizuo Fukui Collection (Japanese Auxiliary Ships)" (1993, posthumous) ISBN 9784769806585
- "Shizuo Fukui Collection (Cruisers Worldwide)" (1994, posthumous) ISBN 9784769806561
- "Shizuo Fukui Collection (Japanese Submarines)" (1994, posthumous) ISBN 9784769806578
- "Shizuo Fukui Collection (Japanese Aircraft Carriers)" (1996, posthumous) ISBN 9784769806554
- "Shizuo Fukui Collection (Japanese Special Ships)" (2001, posthumous) ISBN 9784769809982
- "Shizuo Fukui Collection (History of Japanese Warship Construction)" (2003, posthumous) ISBN 9784769811596

=== Photobooks ===
- "Photographs of all Ships in the Shizuo Fukui Collection" (1994) ISBN 4584170541
- "The Photographic Records of Fierce Courage in Battle" (1995) ISBN 4584170622
- "Photo Collection of Imperial Japanese Navy Warships: A Pictorial Catalog in the Kure City Maritime History Museum by Shizuo Fukui" (2005, posthumous) ISBN 9784478950562
- "Japanese Aircraft Carriers and Seaplanes: A Pictorial Catalog in the Kure City Maritime History Museum by Shizuo Fukui" (2005, posthumous) ISBN 9784478950562
- "Japanese Ships: A Pictorial Catalog in the Kure City Maritime History Museum by Shizuo Fukui" (2005, posthumous) ISBN 9784478950593
- "Japanese Destroyers: A Pictorial Catalog in the Kure City Maritime History Museum by Shizuo Fukui" (2005, posthumous) ISBN 9784478950609
- "Japanese Submarines: A Pictorial Catalog in the Kure City Maritime History Museum by Shizuo Fukui" (2005, posthumous) ISBN 9784478950616
