= Takeo Fukui =

Japanese businessman (born 1944)

- Born: 28 November 1944 (age 81); Hiroshima, Japan

Takeo Fukui (福井 威夫, Fukui Takeo; born November 28, 1944) is the former president and CEO of Honda Motor Co., Ltd. He is from Tokyo, Japan, though his mother gave birth to him in Hiroshima to escape intensifying air raids during World War II. He graduated from Waseda University with a bachelor's degree in Applied Chemistry. He began working at Honda in April 1969.

== Career ==
Fukui worked on the CVCC (Compound Vortex Controlled Combustion) engine as his first project at Honda to reduce toxic exhaust emissions. The CVCC, which became the base for the Honda Civic car, became the first vehicle to comply with the 1975 U.S. Clean Air Act without a catalytic converter. A motorsports fan, he joined Honda for its participation in the Formula One races, and many years later served as the representative for the Honda works team upon their first, and only, victory at the 2006 Hungarian Grand Prix.

=== Positions ===
- Honda Motor Company, 1969–1979, engineer;
- Honda R&D Company, 1979–1982, chief engineer;
- Honda Racing Corporation, 1982–1983, chief engineer; 1983–1985, director; 1985–1987, executive vice president;
- Honda R&D Company, 1987–1988, managing director;
- Honda Racing Corporation, 1987–1988, president;
- Honda Motor Company, 1988–1990, director;
- Honda R&D Company, 1990–1991, senior managing director;
- Honda Motor Company, 1991–1992, general manager of Motorcycle Development; 1992–1994, general manager of Hamamatsu Factory, Motorcycle Operations;
- Honda of America Manufacturing, 1994–1996, executive vice president and director;
- Honda Motor Company, 1996–1998, managing director;
- Honda of America Manufacturing, 1996–1998, president and director;
- Honda R&D Company, 1998–2003, president;
- Honda Motor Company, 1999–2003, senior managing and representative director; 2003–February 2009, president and CEO.
