= Sunosaki-class combat support ship =

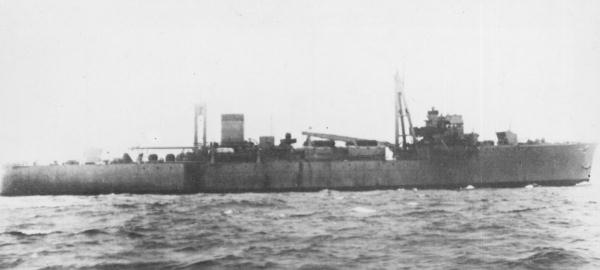
- Sunosaki in 1943

Class overview
- Name: Sunosaki-class combat support ship
- Builders: Mitsubishi Heavy Industries
- Operators: Imperial Japanese Navy
- Built: 1942–1943
- In commission: 1943–1944
- Planned: 5
- Completed: 2
- Canceled: 3
- Lost: 2

General characteristics
- Displacement: 4,465 long tons (4,537 t) standard
- Length: 108.5 m (356 ft 0 in) overall
- Beam: 15.0 m (49 ft 3 in)
- Draught: 5.0 m (16 ft 5 in)
- Propulsion: 2 × MAN Mk.4 diesels; 2 shafts, 4,500 bhp
- Speed: 16 knots (18 mph; 30 km/h)
- Range: 4,000 nmi (7,400 km) at 14 kn (16 mph; 26 km/h)
- Capacity: 1,080 tons for gasoline; 440 tons for ammunitions and food
- Complement: 161
- Armament: Sunosaki, 1943; 2 × 120 mm (4.7 in) L/45 AA gun; 4 × Type 96 25mm AA guns

The Sunosaki-class combat support ship (洲埼型給油艦, Sunosaki-gata kyūyukan) was a class of two support ships of the Imperial Japanese Navy (IJN), serving during World War II.

== Construction ==
In 1939, the IJN planned two support ship classes to help their aircraft carriers. One was the 8,000-ton Ashizuri class, the other one the 4,500 ton Sunosaki class. The Sunosaki was planned to support for two medium-sized carriers (Sōryū and Hiryū) in the battlefield. The thought is the same as USS Sacramento.

== Service ==
The Sunosaki class was unable to support Japan's carrier task force, because their commissions were delayed. They sailed between the Japanese mainland and Southeast Asia, and were lost before participating in a naval battle.

== Ships in class ==
Ship #	Ship	Builder	Laid down	Launched	Completed	Fate
103	Sunosaki (洲埼)	Mitsubishi Heavy Industries, Yokohama Shipyard	25-03-1942	28-12-1942	15-05-1943	Burned by air raid at Manila Bay 21-09-1944. Scuttled 04-10-1944.
233	Takasaki (高崎)	Mitsubishi Heavy Industries, Yokohama Shipyard	16-07-1942	03-05-1943	02-09-1943	Sunk by USS Puffer at Sulu Sea 06°33′N 122°55′E 05-06-1944.
234	Tsurugizaki (剣埼)					Cancelled on 05-05-1944.
235	Kōzaki (神埼)					Cancelled on 05-05-1944.
236	Hijirizaki (聖埼) or Toyosaki (豊埼)					Cancelled on 05-05-1944.
