= Japanese submarine I-12 =

Imperial Japanese Navy submarine

History

Imperial Japanese Navy
- Name: Submarine No. 620
- Builder: Kawasaki, Kobe, Japan
- Laid down: 5 November 1942
- Renamed: I-12 on 5 July 1943
- Launched: 3 August 1943
- Commissioned: 25 May 1944
- Fate: Sunk 13 November 1944
- Stricken: 10 August 1945

Service record
- Part of: Submarine Squadron 11
- Commanders: Kaneo Kudo; 25 May 1944 – 13 November 1943

General characteristics
- Class & type: Type A2 submarine
- Displacement: 2,920 tons surfaced; 4,150 tons submerged
- Length: 113.7 m (373 ft 0 in)
- Beam: 11.7 m (38 ft 5 in)
- Draft: 5.89 m (19 ft 4 in)
- Propulsion: 2 diesel engines, 4,700 hp (3,505 kW); Electric motors, 1,200 hp (895 kW)
- Speed: 17.5 knots (32 km/h; 20 mph) surfaced; 6.2 knots (11 km/h; 7 mph) submerged
- Range: 22,000 nmi (41,000 km; 25,000 mi) at 16 knots (30 km/h) (surfaced); 22,000 nmi (41,000 km; 25,000 mi) at 3 knots (6 km/h) (submerged)
- Test depth: 100 m (328 ft)
- Complement: 114
- Armament: 6 × 533 mm forward torpedo tubes; 18 Type 95 torpedoes; 1 × 14 cm/40 11th Year Type naval gun; 2 × twin 25 mm (1 in) AA guns
- Aircraft carried: 1 × Yokosuka E14Y floatplane

I-12 was an Imperial Japanese Navy Type A2 long-range fleet submarine that served during World War II. Designed as a submarine aircraft carrier, she was commissioned in May 1944. Her crew committed a war crime when they attacked the survivors of a ship she sank in October 1944. She was sunk in November 1944 during her first war patrol.

== Design and description ==
Type A2 submarines were versions of the preceding Type A1 with less powerful engines, adopted to reduce their construction time. I-12 was the only submarine completed to the original Type A2 design; subsequent Type A2s were constructed to a modified design as the Type AM. Like the preceding Type A1 submarines, I-12 was fitted as a squadron flagship. She displaced 2,967 tonnes (2,920 long tons) on the surface and 4,217 tonnes (4,150 long tons) submerged. She was 113.7 meters (373 ft 0 in) long and had a beam of 11.7 meters (38 ft 5 in) and a draft of 5.89 meters (19 ft 4 in). She had a diving depth of 100 meters (328 ft).

For surface running, I-12 powered by two 4,700-brake-horsepower (3,505 kW) diesel engines, each driving one propeller shaft. When submerged each propeller was driven by a 1,200-horsepower (895 kW) electric motor. She could reach 17.5 knots (32.4 km/h; 20.1 mph) on the surface and 6.2 knots (11.5 km/h; 7.1 mph) submerged. On the surface, she had a range of 22,000 nautical miles (40,700 km; 25,300 mi) at 16 knots (30 km/h; 18 mph); submerged, she had a range of 75 nmi (139 km; 86 mi) at 3 knots (5.6 km/h; 3.5 mph).

I-12 was armed with six internal bow 53.3 cm (21 in) torpedo tubes and carried a total of 18 Type 95 torpedoes. She also was armed with a single 140 mm (5.5 in)/40 deck gun and two twin 25 mm (1 in) Type 96 anti-aircraft gun mounts.

As in Type A1 submarines, I-12′s aircraft hangar was integrated into her conning tower and faced forward, and the aircraft catapult was forward of the hangar, while the deck gun was aft of the conning tower. This allowed aircraft launching from I-12 to use the forward motion of the submarine to supplement the speed imparted by the catapult.

== Construction and commissioning ==
Built by Kawasaki at Kobe, Japan, I-12 was laid down as Submarine No. 620 on 5 November 1942. On 5 July 1943 she was renamed I-12 and attached provisionally to the Yokosuka Naval District. She was launched on 3 August 1943 and was completed and commissioned on 25 May 1944.

== Service history ==
=== May–September 1944 ===
On the day of her commissioning, I-12 was formally attached to the Yokosuka Naval District and assigned to Submarine Squadron 11 in the 6th Fleet for work-ups, with Commander Kaneo Kudo in command, who remained her commanding officer for the submarine's entire career. She departed Kobe, Japan, on 20 September 1944 and conducted work-ups before arriving at Kure, Japan, on 30 September 1944.

=== First war patrol ===
The staff of the Combined Fleet ordered the 6th Fleet to send a long-range submarine to disrupt Allied sea lines of communication between the United States West Coast and Hawaii, and the 6th Fleet selected I-12 for the operation. Attached directly to 6th Fleet headquarters, she departed Kobe on 4 October 1944 for her first war patrol, ordered to attack shipping along the U.S. West Coast, in the Hawaiian Islands area, in the Tahiti area, and in the Pacific Ocean east of the Marshall Islands. She proceeded through the Seto Inland Sea and Sea of Japan to Hakodate, where she paused in Hakodate Bay on 7 October 1944 for an overnight stop. She then got back underway and passed through the Tsugaru Strait into the Pacific Ocean.

During the early hours of 28 October 1944, the American 7,176-gross register ton Liberty ship SS John A. Johnson — which had departed San Francisco, California, on 24 October with 41 crewmen, 28 United States Navy Armed Guard personnel, and a United States Army cargo security officer aboard bound for Honolulu, Territory of Hawaii, with a cargo of crated and uncrated U.S. Army trucks on her deck and 6,900 tons of food and provisions and 140 or 150 tons (according to different sources) of explosives in her holds — broke radio silence for 12 minutes to report the loss overboard in heavy seas of a life raft, a common practice in peacetime to avoid unnecessary search-and-rescue operations if the raft was found, despite the suspension of such reports during World War II due to the wartime proliferation of rafts and wreckage and the need to maintain communications security. I-12, on the surface to recharge her batteries at the time, intercepted the transmission, fixed John A. Johnson′s position, and steered to intercept her. At 21:05 on 29 October 1944, I-12 was submerged 1,000 nautical miles (1,900 km; 1,200 mi) northeast of Oahu, Hawaii, when she fired two torpedoes at John A. Johnson, which was making 8.9 knots (16.5 km/h; 10.2 mph) in rough seas. One torpedo passed about 50 yards (46 m) astern of John A. Johnson and exploded 2 nautical miles (3.7 km; 2.3 mi) to port and astern of her, but the other hit her on her starboard side immediately forward of the bridge. The torpedo hit broke John A. Johnson′s keel, flooded her No. 3 hold, and destroyed one of her lifeboats, and she quickly lost all electrical power. John A. Johnson′s crew transmitted a distress signal reporting her position as 29°55′N 141°25′W. The ship began to break up forward of her bridge three minutes later, and she broke in two ten minutes after the torpedo hit. Her crew and U.S. Navy Armed Guard detachment abandoned ship, different sources giving different locations for where she was torpedoed but at least one claiming they abandoned her at 31°55′N 139°45′W. One of her lifeboats foundered, but all 70 men on board abandoned her in Lifeboats No. 2 and 4 and a life raft.

I-12 surfaced 30 minutes later and steered toward the lifeboats at high speed. She attempted to ram Lifeboat No. 2, and some of its occupants jumped overboard. I-12 merely brushed the lifeboat, but immediately opened fire on its occupants and men in the water who had jumped out of the boat with her 25 mm antiaircraft guns as 10 to 15 members of her crew on deck shouted Banzai! after each burst of automatic weapons fire. For 45 minutes, I-12 moved about in the vicinity of the lifeboats, attempting to ram Lifeboat No. 4, discovering the life raft with 17 survivors aboard and opening fire on it with her 25-millimeter guns, all the while shooting any survivors she found and attempting to slice up men in the water with her propellers. She then opened gunfire on both sections of John A. Johnson from a range of 2,000 yards (1,800 m), and after she fired eight 140-millimeter (5.5 in) rounds, scoring four hits, both sections were on fire. She remained on the scene for another two hours, although she did not resume firing at the remaining survivors, who believed that she was waiting for dawn so that she could continue the massacre in daylight.

Just after 01:00 on 30 October 1944, a Pan American World Airways Boeing 314 Clipper flying boat flying from San Francisco to Honolulu sighted the two burning halves of John A. Johnson, the lifeboats, and I-12 on the surface nearby. The airliner's crew and passengers also saw John A. Johnson′s bow section explode at 01:05, sending flames 700 feet (213 m) into the air, after which it sank. Her burning stern section remained afloat. The aircraft reported the sighting to authorities in San Francisco, who in turn notified the United States Navy patrol vessel USS Argus, whose crew had heard the explosion of John A. Johnson′s bow section from 90 nautical miles (170 km; 100 mi) away and already was headed toward the scene. A search-and-rescue aircraft sighted the survivors at 08:00 on 30 October, and at 14:00 Argus reached the scene and brought aboard 60 survivors. Argus disembarked the survivors at San Francisco on 3 November 1944. They described I-12 as a very large submarine, painted black or dark grey above the waterline and light grey below it, with a 6-inch (15 cm) horizontal stripe running around her stern.

Sources differ on casualties during the sinking and subsequent massacre, but at least six men were killed. One source claims that four crewmen, five Navy Armed Guard personnel, and the U.S. Army cargo security officer were left missing and presumed dead, and another specifies that 10 men died. Because John A. Johnson broke in two, the Japanese erroneously credited I-12 with sinking two ships.

A U.S. Navy hunter-killer group centered around the escort carrier USS Corregidor began to search for I-12, and TBM Avenger aircraft from Corregidor reported that they attacked unidentified submarines on 2 and 4 November 1944. Some sources have claimed that the New Zealand four-masted barque Pamir sighted I-12 at 24°31′N 146°47′W on 12 November 1944, but this hypothesis largely has been discredited, and according to one source it is more likely that Pamir sighted the U.S. Navy submarine USS Spot.

=== Loss ===
On 13 November 1944, the U.S. Navy minesweeper USS Ardent and the United States Coast Guard-crewed U.S. Navy patrol frigate USS Rockford were escorting a six-ship convoy at about the midpoint of its voyage from Honolulu to San Francisco when at 12:32 Ardent′s sonar detected a submerged submarine ahead of the convoy 1,000 nautical miles (1,900 km; 1,200 mi) west-southwest of Los Angeles, California. Ardent attacked first at 12:41, firing a 24-charge pattern of Hedgehog projectiles, and again at 12:46 with a second Hedgehog pattern. No projectiles hit the submarine. Rockford left her escort station to assist, and fired her first Hedgehog barrage of 13 projectiles at 13:08. Fifteen seconds later her crew heard either two explosions before a large underwater detonation rocked the ship, or three distinct detonations followed four minutes later by numerous underwater explosions, according to different sources. Ardent carried out two more Hedgehog attacks and Rockford dropped 13 depth charges to ensure the submarine′s destruction. After more explosions Ardent and Rockford lost all contact with the submarine at either 31°55′N 139°45′W or 31°48′N 139°52′W, according to different sources. Diesel oil, air bubbles, and debris including teak deck planks, ground cork covered in diesel oil, pieces of varnished mahogany inscribed in Japanese, a wooden slat from a vegetable crate with Japanese writing and advertisements on it, and a piece of an instrument case inscribed with Japanese characters. Both Ardent and Rockford received credit for the probable destruction of a Japanese submarine, which probably was I-12.

On 19 December 1944, 6th Fleet headquarters ordered I-12 to return to Kure, but she did not acknowledge receipt of the message. However, Japanese signals intelligence intercepted Allied communications indicating the sinking of an Allied transport and tanker in the mid-Pacific Ocean between 20 and 31 December 1944 and U.S. Navy sightings of a Japanese submarine in the Hawaiian Islands area on 2 and 4 January 1945, leading the 6th Fleet staff to conclude that I-12 still was on patrol. The 6th Fleet staff also assessed that a garbled interception of an Allied report of a surfaced Japanese submarine seen north of the Marshall Islands at 14°10′N 171°02′E on 5 January 1945 was a sighting of I-12 as she returned from her patrol. On 31 January 1945, however, the Imperial Japanese Navy declared I-12 to be presumed lost with all 114 hands in the mid-Pacific Ocean. The Japanese removed her from the navy list on 10 August 1945.
