= Ashizuri-class combat support ship =

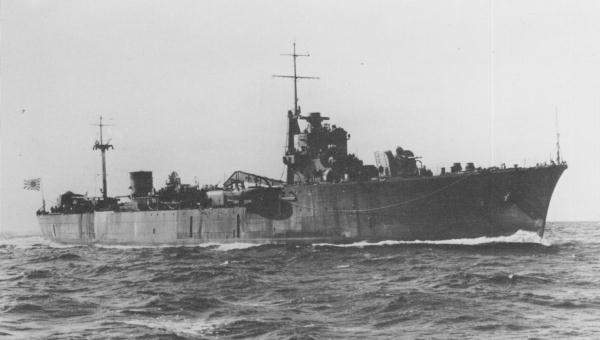
- Ashizuri in 1943

Class overview
- Name: Ashizuri-class combat support ship
- Builders: Mitsubishi Heavy Industries
- Operators: Imperial Japanese Navy
- Built: 1941–1943
- In commission: 1943–1944
- Planned: 2
- Completed: 2
- Lost: 2

General characteristics
- Displacement: 7,951 long tons (8,079 t) standard
- Length: 133.0 m (436 ft 4 in) overall
- Beam: 16.8 m (55 ft 1 in)
- Draught: 6.0 m (19 ft 8 in)
- Propulsion: 2 × Mitsubishi/MAN Model 60 diesels, 2 shafts, 6,000 bhp (4,500 kW)
- Speed: 16 knots (18 mph; 30 km/h)
- Range: 5,500 nmi (10,200 km) at 14 kn (16 mph; 26 km/h)
- Capacity: 2,350 tons for gasoline; 880 tons for ammunition and food
- Complement: 192
- Armament: Ashizuri, 1943; 4 × 127 mm (5 in) L/40 AA gun; 4 × Type 96 25mm AA guns

The Ashizuri-class combat support ship (足摺型給油艦, Ashizuri-gata kyūyukan) was a class of two support ships of the Imperial Japanese Navy (IJN), serving during World War II.

== Construction ==
In 1940, the IJN planned two support ship classes to help their aircraft carriers. One was the 4,500-ton Sunosaki class, the other one the 8,000 ton Ashizuri class. The Ashizuri was planned to support for two large-sized carriers (Akagi, Kaga and Shōkaku class) in the battlefield. The thought is the same as USS Sacramento.

== Service ==
Not joining the IJN till mid-1943 when the Japanese navy was well and truly on the back foot, the ships participated in convoy duties delivering fuel oil around Southeast Asia. Their top speed of 16 knots meant that they would not have been capable of keeping up with the fast carrier battle groups.

Ashizuri was sunk by the USS Puffer on 5 June 1944, and Shioya was lost to USS Rasher three days later.

== Ships in class ==
Ship #	Ship	Builder	Laid down	Launched	Completed	Fate
219	Ashizuri (足摺)	Mitsubishi Heavy Industries, Nagasaki Shipyard	08-07-1941	16-05-1942	30-01-1943	Sunk by USS Puffer at Sulu Sea 06°33′N 122°55′E 05-06-1944.
220	Shioya (塩屋)	Mitsubishi Heavy Industries, Nagasaki Shipyard	01-04-1942	08-03-1943	09-11-1943	Sunk by USS Rasher at west of Manado 08-06-1944.
