= Sokuten-class minelayer =

Imperial Japanese Navy minelayer class

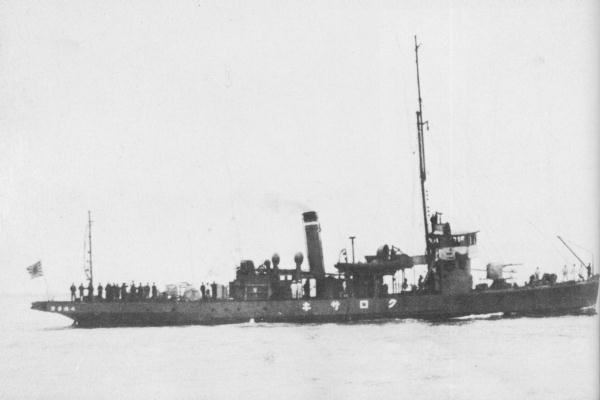
- Kurosaki in 1934

Class overview
- Name: Natsushima; Sokuten class
- Builders: Kure Naval Arsenal; Maizuru Naval Arsenal; Uchida Zōsen; Yokohama Iron Works; Yokohama Dock Company
- Operators: Imperial Japanese Navy; Japan Maritime Safety Agency; Republic of China Navy; Soviet Navy; People's Liberation Army Navy
- Succeeded by: Tsubame class
- Built: ? – 1921
- In commission: 1911–1970
- Planned: 13
- Completed: 13
- Lost: 4
- Retired: 9

General characteristics Natsushima
- Type: Minelayer
- Displacement: 405 long tons (411 t) standard
- Propulsion: 2 × three expansion stages reciprocating engines; 1 × water tube boiler; 2 shafts, 600 shp (450 kW)
- Complement: 40
- Armament: 2 × Armstrong 3 in (76 mm) L/40 guns

General characteristics Sokuten class
- Type: Minelayer
- Displacement: 405 long tons (411 t) standard
- Length: 45.7 m (149 ft 11 in) Lpp
- Beam: 7.6 m (24 ft 11 in)
- Draught: 2.3 m (7 ft 7 in)
- Propulsion: 2 × three expansion stages reciprocating engines; 2 shafts, 600 shp; Enoshima and Kurosaki; 1 × Ikeda model water tube boiler; all others; 1 × Kampon water tube boiler
- Speed: 12 knots (22 km/h; 14 mph)
- Endurance: Fuel: Sokuten and Toshima; 30 tons coal; Kuroshima, Ashizaki, Katoku and Entō; 60.5 tons coal; and after the Kurokami; 70 tons coal
- Complement: 40
- Armament: Sokuten; 2 × Armstrong 3 in L/40 guns; all others; 1 × Type 41 76.2 mm (3.00 in) L/40 naval gun; 82 × Mk.5 naval mines; 18 × depth charges; Kurosaki, 1945; 1 × Type 41 76.2 mm L/40 gun; 2 × Type 93 13.2 mm (0.52 in) AA guns; ? × naval mines; ? × depth charges; 2 × depth charge projectors

The Sokuten-class minelayer (測天型敷設特務艇,, Sokuten-gata Fusetsu-Tokumutei) was a class of auxiliary minelayers of the Imperial Japanese Navy (IJN), serving during the 1910s and World War II. They were called the Sokuten class from their nameship. They were also called the Toshima class after Sokuten was retired. In some sources Natsushima was included in this class. Their official class name was not mentioned in IJN official documents.

== Background ==
- The IJN intended to update their mineboats for local guards.

== Construction ==
- In 1911, the IJN built the first experimental boat Natsushima (Natsushima Maru). Natsushima attached importance to gun-fights. Therefore, she was equipped with two 3-inch (76 mm) Armstrong guns.
- In 1913, the IJN built the second experimental boat Sokuten (Sokuten Maru No. 1). She was an improved model of Natsushima, and her equipment was almost the same as Natsushima.
- The IJN adopted Sokuten's hull design, and started production.
- Kuroshima, Kurokami and Kurosaki were equipped with netlayer facilities. However, those armaments were not announced.

== Service history ==
Natsushima was retired in 1927, and Sokuten was retired in 1936. The other sisters participated to World War II, and nine boats survived the war.

== Ships in class ==
Ship	Builder	Launched	Completed	Fate
Natsushima (夏島) (ex-Natsushima Maru)	Yokohama Dock Company	March 1911	June 1911	Renamed Natsushima on 1 July 1920. Sold on 27 August 1927. Later scrapped.
Sokuten (測天) (ex-Sokuten Maru No. 1)	Maizuru Naval Arsenal	March 1913	4 July 1913	Renamed Sokuten on 1 July 1920. Decommissioned on 25 August 1936.
Toshima (戸島) (ex-Toshima Maru)	Maizuru Naval Arsenal	October 1914	20 March 1915	Renamed Toshima on 1 July 1920. Sunk by aircraft at Maizuru on 30 July 1945.
Kuroshima (黒島) (ex-Kuroshima Maru)	Maizuru Naval Arsenal	October 1914	25 April 1915	Renamed Kuroshima on 1 July 1920. Decommissioned on 5 October 1945. Surrendered to Republic of China on 3 October 1947. Decommissioned in 1960.
Ashizaki (葦埼) (ex-Ashizaki Maru)	Maizuru Naval Arsenal	October 1915	12 May 1916	Renamed Ashizaki on 1 July 1920. Decommissioned on 5 October 1945. Aground at Kamikaifu on 17 November 1945. Later scrapped.
Katoku (加徳) (ex-Katoku Maru)	Maizuru Naval Arsenal	October 1915	4 April 1916	Renamed Katoku on 1 July 1920. Decommissioned on 5 October 1945. Surrendered to United States on 3 October 1947. Sold to Japan on 8 March 1948. Transferred to Maritime Safety Agency and given the pennant number PS-29 (later PB-29) on 1 May 1948. Decommissioned on 16 April 1952. Sold to Setonaikai Kisen inc., and renamed Tsurumi. Retired in 1970.
Entō (円島) (ex-Entō Maru)	Maizuru Naval Arsenal	March 1917	16 May 1917	Renamed Entō on 1 July 1920. Heavy damaged by aircraft at Fangliao on 15 January 1945, later sank in shallow water.
Kurokami (黒神) (ex-Kurokami Maru)	Kure Naval Arsenal	February 1917	1 May 1917	Renamed Kurokami on 1 July 1920. Decommissioned on 5 October 1945. Surrendered to United Kingdom on 14 November 1947. Later scrapped.
Katashima (片島) (ex-Katashima Maru)	Maizuru Naval Arsenal	February 1917	19 May 1917	Renamed Katashima on 1 July 1920. Decommissioned on 5 October 1945. Surrendered to Soviet Union on 3 October 1947. Transferred to PLAN in 1956 at Dalian.
Enoshima (江之島) (ex-Enoshima Maru)	Maizuru Naval Arsenal		31 March 1919	Renamed Enoshima on 1 July 1920. Decommissioned on 30 April 1946.
Ninoshima (似島)	Kure Naval Arsenal	May 1920	15 October 1920	Decommissioned on 30 November 1945.
Kurosaki (黒埼)	Uchida Zōsen		24 December 1921	Aground at Hachinohe on 18 November 1945. Later scrapped.
Washizaki (鷲埼) (ex-Minelayer No. 45)	Yokohama Iron Works		30 September 1921	Renamed Washizaki on 16 May 1926. Decommissioned on 30 November 1945. Surrendered to United Kingdom on 24 November 1947. Later scrapped.

== Photos ==
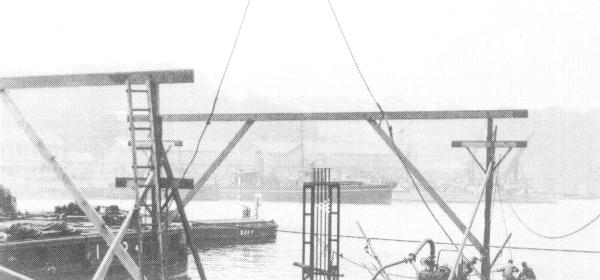
Natsushima (as Natsushima Maru) on 10 October 1912

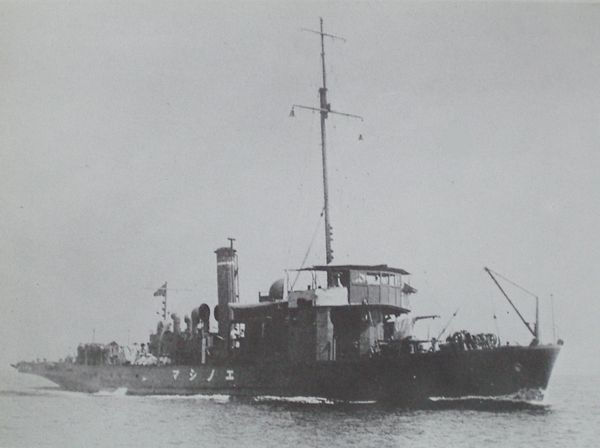
Enoshima in 1930

== Bibliography ==
- "Rekishi Gunzō"., History of Pacific War Vol. 51, "The truth histories of the Imperial Japanese Vessels Part-2", Gakken (Japan), June 2002, ISBN 4-05-602780-3
- Ships of the World special issue Vol. 45, Escort Vessels of the Imperial Japanese Navy, "Kaijinsha"., (Japan), February 1996
- The Maru Special, Japanese Naval Vessels No. 47, "Japanese naval mine warfare crafts", "Ushio Shobō". (Japan), January 1981
- Editorial Committee of the Navy, Navy Vol. 11, "Part of small vessels, auxiliary vessels, miscellaneous service ship and converted merchant ships, Seibunsha K.K. (Japan), August 1981
