= Senshi Sōsho =

Japanese military history

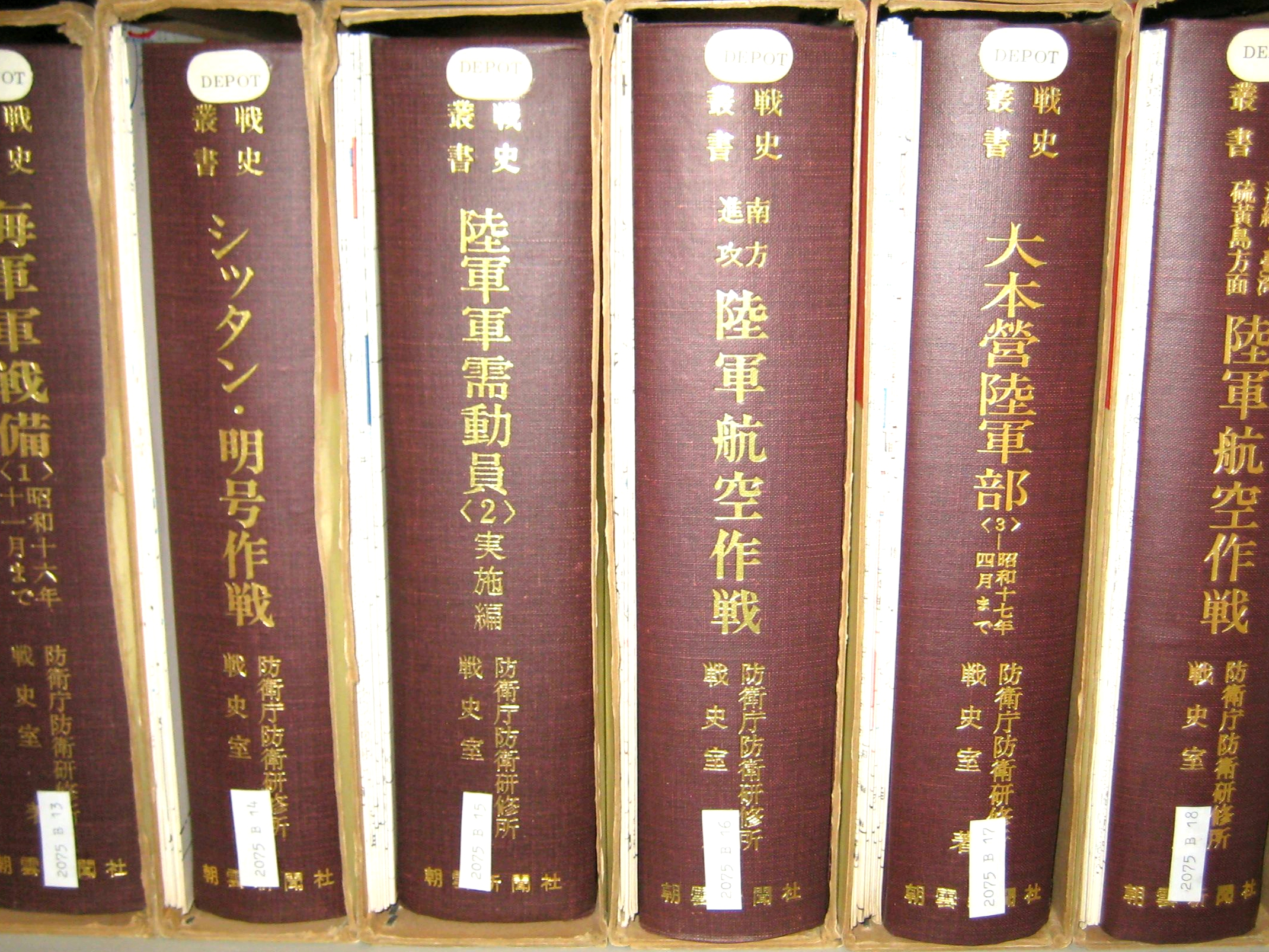
Some volumes of Senshi Sōsho

The Senshi Sōsho (戦史叢書, War History Series), also called the Kōkan Senshi (公刊戦史), is the official military history of Imperial Japan's involvement in the Pacific War from 1937 to 1945. The task of compiling the official account of the Japanese involvement in World War II began in October 1955 with the opening of the War History Office (the present Military History Department of the "National Institute for Defense Studies", or NIDS, of Japan's Ministry of Defense in Tokyo, Japan). Its main function was to serve as educational research material for the Self-Defense Forces. The office was led by Colonel Nishiura Susumu, a senior official in the War Ministry during the war. The publisher was Asagumo Shimbunsha.

The history, comprising 102 volumes, the first of which was published in 1966 and the final one in 1980, was compiled from Imperial Japanese Army, Imperial Japanese Navy, other Japanese government records, and personal diaries and records which survived Japan's defeat in the war. Many of the records were initially confiscated by Allied governments, mainly the United States, but were returned to Japan in 1958. The 102 numbered volumes of the series include 37 volumes on the Imperial Headquarters, 34 volumes on army campaigns, 21 volumes on navy campaigns, nine volumes about air services campaigns, and one volume of chronology. In 1985 and 1986 two supplemental unnumbered volumes were published.

== English translations ==
The work provides information and details on Japanese organization and operations in the whole Pacific Theater of Operations. Currently, only a limited number of volumes were translated, making it difficult for Western historians who do not read Japanese to make use of the information in western studies of the Pacific War.

=== By the Corts Foundation ===
Two volumes (Vol. 3 "Occupation of Dutch East Indies" and Vol. 26 "The Operations of the Navy in the Dutch East Indies and the Bay of Bengal") have been translated into English by The Corts Foundation. A third volume (Vol. 34 "Army Air Drive to the Southern Pacific") was translated into English and published as "The Invasion of the South: Army Air Force Operations, and the Invasion of Northern and Central Sumatra" in 2021. These translations focus specifically on the volumes relevant to the study of the Japanese attack on and the subsequent occupation of the former Dutch East Indies in the period of 1941 to 1945.

=== By Australian War Memorial ===
There is another translation by The Australian War Memorial, "Japanese army operations in the South Pacific Area: New Britain and Papua campaigns, 1942–43". This book is a translation of portions of volumes 14 ("Army Operations in the South Pacific: Port Moresby to the First Phase of Guadalcanal, pt. 1") and 28 ("Army Operations in the South Pacific: Guadalcanal - Buna Operations, pt. 2") of the Senshi sôsho, covering the invasion of Rabaul, the battles along the Kokoda Trail and at Milne Bay, and the destruction of the Japanese forces at Buna, Gona and Giruwa in northern Papua.

== Digital Japanese edition ==
In December 2018, all updated and corrected volumes became available online at NIDS Library & Historical records Search System.

== Criticisms and discrepancies with other Japanese records ==
=== Philippines ===
Senshi Sōsho's Shō-gō rikugun-sakusen (2), published by Japan's Defence Ministry Bōeichō senshishitsu, is contradicted by Japan's own Ministry of Health and Welfare (社会・援護局) on the number of Japanese dead on the island of Jolo during the Battle of Sulu (スールー諸島の戦い). The Japanese Ministry of Health and Welfare says 6,030 Japanese were in Jolo and most of them were killed, in contrast to Senshi Sōsho which claims there were only 3,425 Japanese of the Independent Combined (Mixed) 55th Brigade (独立混成第55旅団 (日本軍)) on the island. Senshi Sōsho says 135 Japanese survived out of the 3,425 in total on Jolo, and that the casualty rate was 96%, and only mentions the battle on Jolo starting after the American landing on April 9 in 1945 and attributes most Japanese casualties to American actions. barely mentioning local Muslim Moro guerillas.

Japan Center for Asian Historical Records (JACAR) gives yet a totally different number from both Senshi Sōsho and the Japanese Ministry of Health and Welfare, saying there were 3,875 Japanese soldiers in Jolo.

Japanese veterans who actually survived the battle of Sulu on Jolo, endorsed the number by the Japanese Ministry of Health and Welfare that said 6,030 Japanese were there and most of them were killed except 88 survivors, with the Japanese veterans saying one third were killed by local Muslim guerillas right after the 55th mixed brigade landed on Jolo on October 4, 1944, a year before the Americans landed, one third killed by Americans after they landed in Jolo in April 1945, and one third dead of disease.

American military sources also contradict Senshi Sōsho on Jolo, the Americans said 3,900 Japanese were still lodged on Jolo's Mount Daho after the Americans landed in April in 1945, not counting Japanese already killed by local Muslim guerillas in the year before that, and then the Americans and guerillas both attacked Mount Daho to kill the remaining Japanese.

Senshi Sosho cites the 365th Independent Infantry Battallion Major Fujikichi Tenmei and claims brigade commander Major General Tetsuzo Suzuki was killed in action against Americans between 31 July and 2 August 1945 in the middle of Jolo while fighting on the north-south road.

55th Independent Mixed Brigade quartermaster officer at brigade headquarters, Major Takeo Inoue wrote a memoir called "The Crossroads of Fate - Jolo Island, the Island of Annihilation, Was an Isolated Island in the South Seas Inhabited by the Ferocious Moro People" in which his description of the death of brigade commander Major General Tetsuzo Suzuki contradicts Senshi Sosho. Inoue gives a less glorious depiction of Suzuki's death, saying his health failed so much he could not walk when being pursued by Muslim Moro guerillas and soldiers had to use branches to make an improvised stretcher for him, and the soldiers themselves were weak and all of them fell, and then they tied him to a donkey to transport him and he died after being tossed around carried on cliffs, valleys, and steep slopes. He eventually died when they were at the bottom of a valley. Muslim Moro guerillas were chasing the defeating Japanese around the island so they couldn't even give him a burial or ceremony and just dumped his corpse in the valley and he was replaced by Major Kikuo Takeda. Inoue said only 3 field officers including himself survived, with Major Tenmei and an unnamed other battalion commander, with only 81 survivors in total.

Japanese nurse Tsuki Suzuki revealed she found out that Japanese military nurses in the Philippines were euthanised against their will by the Japanese military when they fell ill and they begged not to be euthanised, but the Japanese military euthanised them anyway and lied, saying they perished in battle against the US to their families. Kikue Kobayashi also reported that ill Japanese nurses being killed by the Japanese army in the Philippines and she was forced to live off wild plants, leaves and potato vines and use tree branches to walk and their swollen feet could no longer fit their shoes.

=== China theatre ===
Senshi Sōsho claimed its 13th Army lost 1,284 troops killed or died of illnesses and 11,812 fallen ill and 11th Army lost 336 killed in the Zhejiang-Jiangxi campaign.
A Japanese POW who worked in biowarfare who told Americans he saw Japanese secret documents saying over 1,700 Japanese were killed in their own failed biological warfare attack and over 10,000 ill in the Zhejiang-Jiangxi campaign, but he said that the true number of Japanese dead was bigger since it was normal for the Japanese Army to "pare down unpleasant figures".

According to Senshi Sōsho, the losses of the Japanese Army at the Shanghai Front by November 8, 1937, totaled 9,115 troops killed and 31,257 troops wounded. However, according to a modern study, the Japanese Army lost 17,000 troops killed in action, 1,800 died of illness, 35,000–40,000 wounded, and 40,000 sick in the battle of Shanghai, with the number of deaths seconded by General Iwane Matsui's Speech in 1938.

Senshi Sōsho recorded the losses of the 20th Army from April to June 1945 during the battle of West Hunan as 123 killed, 189 wounded, and 5,336 sick in April, 436 killed, 798 wounded, and 4,657 sick in May, and 136 killed, 194 wounded, and 14,647 sick in June. The total number of deaths recorded in another statistical table were 1,252 deaths including 122 deaths from wounds and 1,007 deaths from illnesses in April, 1,743 deaths including 79 deaths from wounds and 516 deaths from illnesses in May, and 1,035 deaths including 121 deaths from wounds and 778 deaths from illnesses in June. While the number of troops killed in action, died of wounds, and died of illnesses in April and June matched up with the total deaths in these two months, the number of troops with specific classification of deaths totaled only 1,031 while the total deaths recorded in the same month was at 1,743. According to the medical department of the 20th Army, the losses of the army in these three months were 436 killed, 798 wounded (including 75 who died of wounds), and 4,657 sick (including 698 died of illnesses) in April, 1,146 killed, 1,699 wounded (including 79 who died of wounds), and 8,068 sick (including 516 died of illnesses) in May, and 136 killed, 194 wounded (including 121 who died of wounds), and 14,647 sick (including 778 who died of illnesses) in June. The losses in April recorded by Senshi Sōsho are actually the losses for the army in March. The total number of deaths recorded in both sources ended up being similar (4,030 from Senshi Sōsho and 3,987 from the document on the "Japan Center for Asian Historical Records" website) and but the specific number of troops killed in action and died of illnesses differed by a significant margin.

Senshi Sōsho also often copied the same term that the Imperial Japanese Armed Forces had used when referring to certain subjects. For example, Senshi Sōsho recorded that the 106th Division had been supplied with 210 "special smoke canisters" from the air during the battle of Wuhan, which was code word for a type of poison gas canister. Senshi Sōsho sometimes did not record the total losses of an operation or battle. For example, Senshi Sōsho only had the casualties and results of the second phase of the East Zhejiang Operation in May 1941, with no specific numbers for the first phase in April.

Miyuki Endo (遠藤 美幸) in his book "The Mourners: Oral Histories of Former Soldiers and Their Families" (Ikinobiru Books).(『悼むひと 元兵士と家族をめぐるオーラル・ヒストリー』（生きのびるブックス）) interviewed a Japanese soldier named Hirata who was in west Yunnan revealed that because of intra-Japanese racism, all mention of a battle his sub-unit fought with heavy deaths inflicted on his unit by Chinese was not written in both his divisional unit diary and Japan's official war history Senshi Sosho.
