= Oye =

Oye is Spanish for "hey" or "listen". Oye or Oye! or OYE may refer to:

== Geography ==
- Oye, Ekiti, a town and LGA in Ekiti State, Nigeria
- Oye-Plage, a commune in Pas-de-Calais, France
- Oyes, a commune in Marne, France

== People ==
- Kenneth A. Oye, an American political scientist
- Oye Owolewa, an elected official in Washington, D.C.

== Films and television ==
- Oye (film), a 2009 Indian Telugu-language film directed by Anand Ranga
- Oye Lucky! Lucky Oye!, a 2008 Indian Hindi-language film
- Oye! It's Friday!, a 2008 Indian television talk show hosted by Farhan Akhtar

== Music ==
- Premios Oye!, music award

=== Albums ===
- Oye (Aterciopelados album), 2006

=== Songs ===
- "Oye!" (Gloria Estefan song)
- "Oye", the Spanish version of the Beyoncé song "Listen"
- "Oye" (Pitbull song), 2000 song by rapper Pitbull from the 2 Fast 2 Furious soundtrack (2003)
- "Oye", by Enrique Guzmán and César Costa
- "Oye", by Fuerza Regida from Dolido Pero No Arrepentido
- "Oye" by Willie Colón
- "Oye" by El Tri
- "Oye" by Raphael (singer)
- "Oye" by Ana Gabriel
- "Oye" by Arthur Hanlon
- "Oye" by Ilegales
- "Oye" by Pimpinela
- "Oye" by Martina Stoessel
- "Madre Tierra (Oye)", a song by Chayanne from En Todo Estaré

== Acronyms ==
- OYE, Old yellow enzyme, a name for NADPH dehydrogenase

== See also ==
- Øye (disambiguation)
- Oy (disambiguation)
- Oi (disambiguation)
- Oi (interjection)
