= Japanese cruiser Kinu =

Nagara-class light cruiser

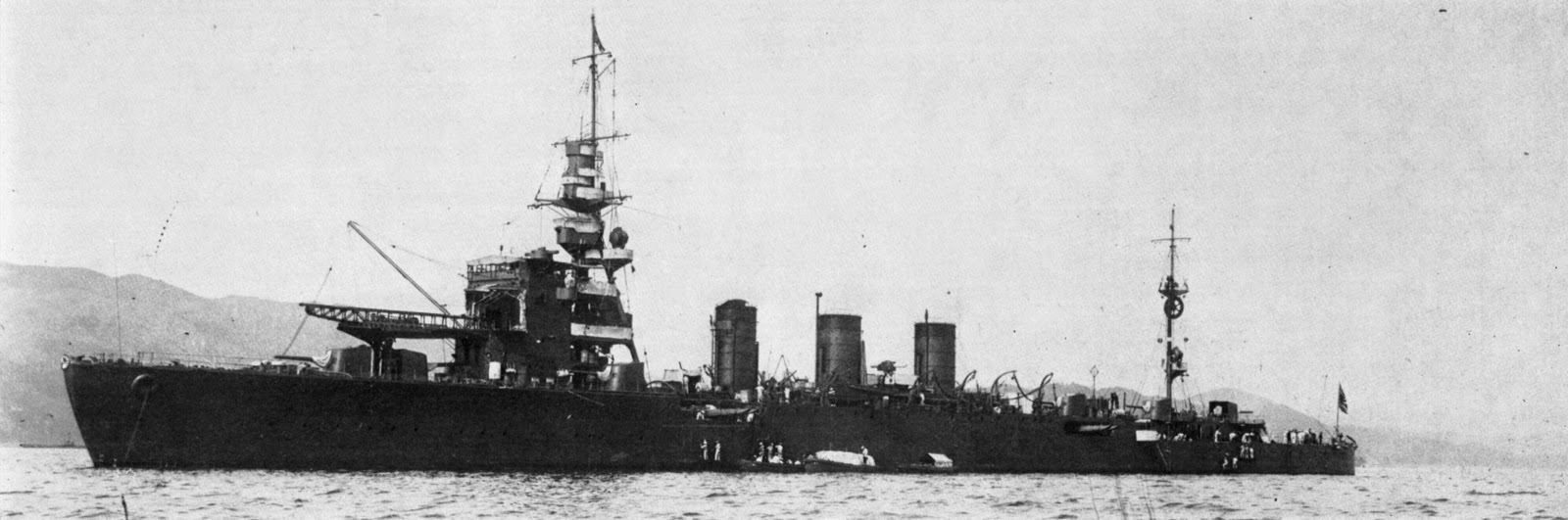
- Kinu in 1931

History

Empire of Japan
- Name: Kinu
- Namesake: Kinu River
- Ordered: 1920 Fiscal Year (1918 "8-6 Fleet" Plan)
- Builder: Kawasaki Shipyards, Kobe
- Laid down: 17 January 1921
- Launched: 29 May 1922
- Commissioned: 10 November 1922
- Stricken: 20 December 1944
- Fate: Sunk 26 October 1944; bombed by USN aircraft; SW of Masbate, Visayan Sea; 11°45′N 123°11′E

General characteristics
- Class & type: Nagara-class cruiser
- Displacement: 5088 tons (standard); 5832 tons (full load)
- Length: 534 ft 9 in (162.99 m)
- Beam: 48 ft 5 in (14.76 m)
- Draught: 16 ft (4.9 m)
- Propulsion: 4 shaft Gihon geared turbines; 12 Kampon boilers; 90,000 shp (67,000 kW)
- Speed: 36 knots (41 mph; 67 km/h)
- Range: 9,000 nautical miles (17,000 km) at 10 knots (19 km/h)
- Complement: 438
- Armament: (Initial); 7 × 14 cm/50 3rd Year Type naval guns; 2 × 8 cm/40 3rd Year Type naval gun s; 8 × 610 mm (24 in) torpedo tubes (4x2); 48 naval mines; (Final) 5 × 14 cm/50 3rd Year Type naval guns; 2 × 12.7 cm/40 Type 89 naval gun s; 2 × triple, 2x twin Type 96 25 mm AA guns; 10 × Type 93 13.2 mm machine guns; 8 × 610 mm (24 in) torpedo tubes (4x2)
- Armor: Belt: 60 mm (2.4 in); Deck: 30 mm (1.2 in)
- Aircraft carried: 1 x floatplane
- Aviation facilities: 1x aircraft catapult

Kinu (鬼怒) was the fifth of the six ships completed Nagara-class light cruiser in the Imperial Japanese Navy, named after the Kinu River in Tochigi prefecture Japan. She was active in World War II in various campaigns in Malaya, the Dutch East Indies and New Guinea before being sunk by United States Navy carrier-based aircraft in the Philippines in 1944.

== Background ==
Following the production of the five Kuma-class cruisers, an additional three 5,500-ton class light cruisers authorized under the 8-4 Fleet Program were ordered by the Imperial Japanese Navy in 1920 as flagships for submarine squadrons. Due to minor changes in design, primarily due to advances in torpedo technology, these three vessels were initially designated as "modified Kuma-class", or "5500-ton class Type II", before being re-designated as a separate class named after the lead vessel, Nagara. A second set of three vessels was authorized in late 1920.

== Design ==
The Nagara-class vessels were essentially identical to the previous Kuma-class cruisers, retaining the same hull design, engines and main weaponry, with the addition of the new 610 mm Type 93 Long Lance Torpedoes, which required a larger launcher. However, in silhouette, a major difference from the Kuma class was in the configuration of the bridge, which incorporated an aircraft hangar. Initially, a 33-foot (10 m) platform was mounted above the No.2 turret, extending over the forward superstructure below the bridge. This was later replaced by an aircraft catapult. Even so, the arrangement proved unwieldy, and the catapult was moved to the rear of each ship in the class, between the No.5 and No.6 turrets during retrofits in 1929-1934. Abukuma and Kinu, were scheduled to receive the new Type 93 torpedoes in early 1941. However, shortages meant that only Abukuma was refitted quadruple mounts in place of the aft twin mounts.

== Service career ==
=== Early career ===
Kinu was completed on 10 November 1922 at the Kawasaki Shipyard in Kobe. She was briefly commanded by Captain Koshirō Oikawa from December 1923 to January 1924. One year after commissioning, she returned to dry dock for the replacement of all four of her turbine engines, which had failed. The repair work was completed in May 1924. From 1934 to 1935 she was largely used as a training vessel. She was under the command of Captain Shigeyoshi Miwa from November 1935 to December 1936. As the Second Sino-Japanese War began to escalate, she supported landings of Japanese troops in central and southern China, and patrolled the China coast from 1937 to 1938.

On 20 November 1941, Kinu was flagship of Rear Admiral Setsuzo Yoshitomi's SubRon 4, based at Iwakuni, Yamaguchi, with SubDiv 18's I-53, I-54, and the I-55, and SubDiv 19's I-56, I-57, and I-58. She was based at Hainan and was engaged in covering landings of Japanese forces in the invasion of British Malaya at the time of the attack on Pearl Harbor.

=== The Hunt for Force Z ===
On 9 December 1941, I-65 reported sighting Force Z (the Royal Navy battleship Prince of Wales, battlecruiser Repulse and supporting destroyers). The report was received by Kinu, Yura and the 81st Naval Communications Unit in Saigon. The reception was poor and it took another 90 minutes to decode and relay the message to Vice Admiral Jisaburo Ozawa aboard his flagship, Chōkai. However, I-65's report was incorrect about the heading of Force Z, throwing the Japanese fleet into confusion. A Kawanishi E7K "Alf" from Kinu buzzed I-65, its pilot mistaking her for an enemy submarine. The following day, Force Z was overwhelmed by torpedo bombers of the 22nd Air Flotilla from French Indochina.

=== Invasion of Malaya and Dutch East Indies ===
On 13 December 1941, Kinu departed Cam Ranh Bay, Indochina with Chōkai, Mogami and Mikuma and the destroyers Hatsuyuki and Shirayuki to provide cover for the invasion landing at Kuantan, Malaya, and from 17–24 December 1941, to cover landings in Brunei and Miri, Seria, Lutong and Kuching in Sarawak. The 2500 men of the "Kawaguchi Detachment" and the No. 2 Yokosuka Special Naval Landing Force (SNLF) quickly captured Miri's airfield and oil fields. The operation was completed, and Kinu returned to its base at Cam Ranh Bay, Indochina by the end of the year.

From January through March, 1942, Kinu continued to provide coverage for further Japanese landings in Malaya, Sarawak and Java. On 1 March 1942, Kinu's convoy was attacked in the Java Sea 90 miles (140 km) west of Surabaya by ten obsolete Vickers Vildebeest biplane bombers and 15 fighters of the Australian and New Zealand Air Forces. Kinu was slightly damaged by near-misses and three crewmen were killed by shrapnel. The following day, north of Surabaya, Kinu was attacked by the submarine USS S-38, which launched four torpedoes, all of which missed.

From 10 March 1942, Kinu was assigned to Sentai-16 and was based at Makassar, Celebes and then Ambon.

=== New Guinea campaigns ===
From 29 March to 23 April 1942, Kinu was assigned to Rear Admiral Ruitaro Fujita's "N" Expeditionary Force for the invasion of Dutch New Guinea, which included the seaplane carrier Chitose, destroyers Yukikaze and Tokitsukaze, torpedo boats Tomozuru, Hatsukari, transports and a Naval Landing Force. Afterwards, for most of the month of May, Kinu returned to Kure Naval Arsenal for an overhaul. After returning to the southern front, Kinu was assigned to patrols of the Java Sea from June through September.

On 13 September 1942, Kinu embarked the 2nd Infantry Division at Batavia with the light cruiser Isuzu for the Solomon Islands. It disembarked the troops at Shortland Island and Bougainville on 22 September 1942 and remained on patrol in the Timor Sea and eastern Dutch East Indies through January 1943.

On 21 January 1943, Kinu was ordered to proceed to Makassar to assist its sister ship, light cruiser Natori which had been damaged by a single USAAF B-24 Liberator bomber at Amboina harbor on Ambon Island, and escorted the damaged cruiser back to Singapore. Kinu continued to patrol from Makassar through June, with an occasional troop and resupply run to New Guinea.

On 23 June 1943, while at Makassar Roads. Kinu and Kuma were anchored at Juliana Quay alongside the cruisers Ōi and Kitakami. The cruisers were attacked by 17 B-24 Liberator bombers of the 319th Squadron/90th Bomb Group (H) of the USAAF 5th Air Force. All four were straddled by near-misses, but suffered only slight damage. Kinu was ordered back to Japan for refit and modifications, arriving at Kure Naval Arsenal on 2 August 1943.

While at Kure, Kinu’s No. 5 and No.7 140-mm guns were removed as were her aircraft catapult and derrick. A twin 12.7 cm/40 Type 89 naval gun was fitted as were two triple mount Type 96 25-mm AA guns. This brought Kinu’s 25-mm anti-aircraft gun total to ten barrels (2x3, 2x2). A Type 21 air search radar was also fitted and depth charge rails were added to her stern. Refit and modifications were completed 14 October 1943, and Kinu immediately departed back for Singapore with troops and supplies. Kinu remained in Singapore, or Malacca or Penang in Malaya or at Batavia in the Dutch East Indies through January 1944.

On 23 January 1944, Kinu with Aoba accompanied by Ōi and Kitakami, and escorted by the destroyer Shikinami made a troop transport run from Singapore to Port Blair, Andaman Islands. On the return voyage to Singapore, Kinu towed Kitakami, which had been damaged by a submarine attack. Kinu remained on patrol in the western Dutch East Indies through April.

From April, Kinu starting escorting transport runs from Saipan via Palau to the Celebes and other locations in the Dutch East Indies.

On 27 May 1944, the United States began "Operation Horlicks" to retake Biak. Kinu, Aoba, and destroyers Shikinami, Uranami and Shigure departed Tarakan to reinforce Biak with 2,300 troops from Zamboanga on Mindanao; however, after being sighted by B-24 bombers and receiving word of the American invasion of Saipan, the operation was canceled and the troops were disembarked at Sorong instead.

On 6 June 1944, while anchored off Weigo Island, Vogelkop, New Guinea, Kinu and Aoba were attacked unsuccessfully by B-24 bombers of the Fifth Air Force's 380th Group. Kinu remained on station for a week, and then returned to her patrol area in the western Dutch East Indies through the end of August.

=== Actions in the Philippines ===
On 25 September 1944, during Japanese "Operation Sho-I-Go" to boost the defenses the Philippines, Kinu, Aoba and the destroyer Uranami were assigned to Vice Admiral Takeo Kurita's First Raiding Force. On 11 October 1944 Aoba collided with Kinu in a training accident off Lingga. Both ships were slightly damaged.

On 21 October 1944 Sentai-16 was detached from Vice Admiral Kurita's Force to assist the Southwest Area Fleet's transport of 2,500 soldiers of the IJA 41st Regiment from Cagayan, Mindanao to Ormoc, Leyte. The convoy was spotted by the submarine USS Bream on 23 October 1944. Bream fired six torpedoes at Aoba, one of which hit her No. 2 engine room. Rear Admiral Sakonjo transferred to Kinu, which towed Aoba to the Cavite Navy Yard near Manila for emergency repairs. The following day, as Kinu and Uranami sortied from Cavite for Cagayan, they were attacked by aircraft from Task Group 38.3's aircraft carriers USS Essex and Lexington. Near misses caused light structural damage, but strafing killed 47 crewmen aboard Kinu and 25 crewmen on Uranami.

On 25 October 1944, Kinu arrived at Cagayan. The naval transports T.6, T.9 and T.10 each embarked 350 troops and the T.101 and T.102 each loaded 400 men, Kinu embarked 347 men and Uranami 150 men. On 26 October 1944 in the Visayan Sea Kinu and Uranami were attacked by 75-80 aircraft from two groups of Task Group 77.4's escort carriers. TBM Avenger torpedo-bombers from USS Natoma Bay and 12 Avengers and FM-2 Wildcat fighters of VC-21 from USS Marcus Island made repeated bomb, rocket and strafing hits on Kinu and Uranami. An Avenger from USS Manila Bay scored two direct bomb hits on Kinu and several rocket hits on Uranami, which sank around noon. At 1130, two more waves of aircraft attacked. A third bomb hit the aft engine room and set Kinu on fire. The Japanese transports rescued most of Kinu's crew of 813 men, including Captain Harumi Kawasaki. Rear Admiral Sakonjo transferred his flag to the transport T.10 and made Manila the next day. At 1730, Kinu sank by the stern in 150 feet (46 m) of water 44 miles (71 km) southwest of Masbate, Philippine Islands.

Kinu was removed from the navy list on 20 December 1944.

On 15 July 1945 divers from USS Chanticleer explored the sunken Kinu, finding the wreck flat on the bottom with a 90 degree list to port, with her back broken in the well deck area behind the bridge, which was largely undamaged. Divers recovered classified documents and four coding machines.
