= Japanese cruiser Kitakami =

Kuma-class cruiser

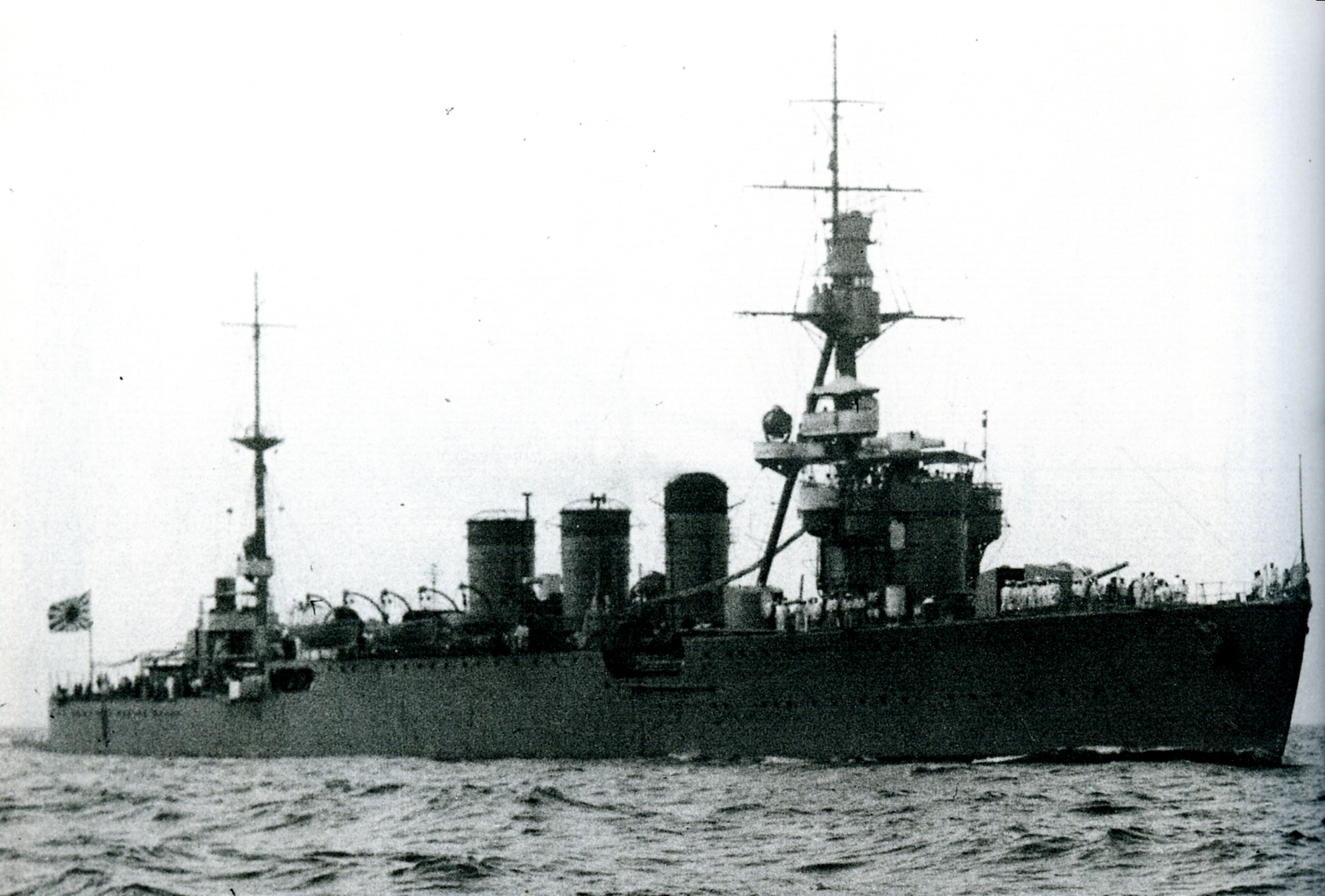
- Kitakami in 1935

History

Empire of Japan
- Name: Kitakami
- Namesake: Kitakami River
- Ordered: 1917 Fiscal Year
- Builder: Sasebo Naval Arsenal, Japan
- Laid down: 1 September 1919
- Launched: 3 July 1920
- Commissioned: 15 April 1921
- Stricken: 30 November 1945
- Fate: Scrapped, August 1946

General characteristics
- Class & type: Kuma-class cruiser
- Displacement: 5,100 long tons (5,182 t) standard
- Length: 152.4 m (500 ft 0 in) o/a
- Beam: 14.2 m (46 ft 7 in)
- Draught: 4.8 m (15 ft 9 in)
- Propulsion: 4 shaft Gihon geared turbines; 12 Kampon boilers; 90,000 shp (67,000 kW)
- Speed: 36 knots (41 mph; 67 km/h)
- Range: 5,000 nautical miles (9,300 km) at 14 knots (26 km/h)
- Complement: 450
- Armament: (initial); 7 × 14 cm/50 3rd Year Type naval guns; 2 × 8 cm/40 3rd Year Type naval guns; 8 × 533 mm (21.0 in) torpedo tubes (4x2); (as torpedo cruiser); 4 × 14 cm/50 3rd Year Type naval guns; 6 × Type 96 25-mm AA guns (2 triple); 40 × 610 mm (24 in) torpedo tubes (10x4); (final); 2 × Type 89 127-mm AA guns; 67 × Type 96 25-mm AA guns (12 triple mounts + 31 single)
- Armor: Belt: 64 mm (3 in); Deck: 29 mm (1 in)
- Aircraft carried: 1 × floatplane
- Aviation facilities: 1 aircraft catapult

Kitakami (北上) was a Kuma-class cruiser in the Imperial Japanese Navy, named after the Kitakami River in Iwate Prefecture, Japan.

== Background ==
After the construction of the Tenryū-class cruisers, the drawbacks of the small cruiser concept became apparent. At the end of 1917, plans for an additional six Tenryū-class vessels, plus three new-design 7,200 ton-class scout cruisers were shelved, in place of an intermediate 5,500 ton-class vessel which could be used as both a long-range, high speed reconnaissance ship, and also as a command vessel for destroyer or submarine flotillas. Kitakami was the third in a series of five vessels in this class which were built from 1918-1921.

== Design ==
The Kuma-class vessels were essentially enlarged versions of the Tenryū-class cruisers, with greater speed, range, and weaponry. With improvements in geared-turbine engine technology, the Kuma-class vessels were capable of the high speed of 36 knots (67 km/h), and a range of 9,000 nmi (17,000 km) at 10 kn (12 mph; 19 km/h).

The number of 14 cm/50 3rd Year Type naval guns was increased from four on the Tenryū class to seven on Kitakami: two forward, one on each side of the superstructure and three aft, which meant that only six guns could be brought to bear on a broadside. The torpedo launchers were also increased to four double launchers: however, the Kuma class remained highly deficient in anti-aircraft protection, with only two 8 cm/40 3rd Year Type naval guns and two machine guns.

== Service career ==
=== Early career ===
Kitakami was laid down on 1 September 1919, launched on 3 July 1920 and completed 15 April 1921 at Sasebo Naval Arsenal, Nagasaki. Soon after commissioning, she was based at Mako, Pescadores Islands. She was commanded by Captain Jinichi Kusaka from November 1931 through December 1932 and Captain Tomoshige Samejima from December 1932 to March 1934. With the start of the Second Sino-Japanese War, she was assigned to cover the landings of Japanese forces in central China.

On 25 August 1941, Kitakami returned to Sasebo for conversion to a "torpedo cruiser" with ten quadruple torpedo tube mounts for the 61 cm (24 in) Type 93 “Long Lance” torpedo, in line with Imperial Japanese Navy plans to create a special "Night Battle Force" of torpedo-cruisers. Modification was completed by 30 September 1941, and Kitakami was assigned to the Japanese First Fleet, CruDiv 9.

=== Early stages of the Pacific War ===
At the time of the attack on Pearl Harbor, Kitakami was escorting the Combined Fleet's battleships from Hashirajima to the Bonin Islands and back to Japan.

From January to May 1942, Kitakami was assigned largely to training duties around the Japanese home islands. At the time of the Battle of Midway on 29 May 1942, Kitakami and her sister ship Ōi were part of the Aleutian Screening Force, and returned safely to Japan on 17 June 1942.

=== As a fast troop transport ===
From August – September 1942, Kitakami and Ōi were converted into fast transports. Their ten quadruple torpedo launchers were reduced to six (a total of 24 tubes). They were equipped with two Daihatsu-class landing craft and were fitted with two triple mount Type 96 25-mm AA guns. Depth charge launch rails were also installed. After conversion, Kitakami and Ōi embarked the No. 4 Maizuiru Special Naval Landing Force, which they transported to Truk in the Caroline Islands and Shortland Island in the Solomon Islands by 6 October 1942.

CruDiv 9 was disbanded on 21 November 1942, and Kitakami was assigned directly to the Combined Fleet. In November, Kitakami transported troops from Manila to Rabaul, New Britain, and returned to Sasebo by the end of the year.

In January 1943, Kitakami was assigned to the reinforcement of Japanese forces in New Guinea, and escorted a convoy with the IJA 20th Infantry Division from Pusan to Wewak, New Guinea via Palau. In February, she escorted a convoy with the IJA 41st Infantry Division from Qingdao to Wewak, again via Palau.

On 15 March 1943, Kitakami was reassigned to CruDiv 16 of the Southwest Area Fleet as a guard ship based out of Surabaya. She escorted three troop convoys from Surabaya to Kaimana, New Guinea during April and May.

On 23 June 1943, while at Makassar, Kitakami, Ōi, Kinu and Kuma were bombed by Consolidated B-24 Liberators of the 5th Air Force's 319th Bomb Squadron. None of the cruisers were hit, but some sustained slight damage from near-misses.

After refit at Seletar Naval Base, Singapore in August, Kitakami escorted a troop convoy from Singapore to the Nicobar Islands in early September. Two more convoys were escorted to Port Blair, Andaman Islands in late October.

In late January 1944, Kitakami escorted another convoy to Port Blair. On its return voyage while transiting Malacca Strait, southwest of Penang, Malaya, on 27 January 1944, the Kitakami was hit aft by two torpedoes fired by the submarine HMS Templar. Kinu took Kitakami in tow to Angsa Bay, Malaya for emergency repairs, followed by extensive repairs at the No. 101 Repair Facility at Seletar Naval Base, Singapore in February. Repairs were not completed until 21 June 1944. However, after departing Singapore to escort the tanker Kyokuto maru, Kitakami began to take on water and had to put into Cavite Navy Yard in the Philippines from 12 July 1944 to 26 July 1944. Despite the additional repairs, Kitakami still took on water on her return voyage to Sasebo.

=== As a Kaiten carrier ===
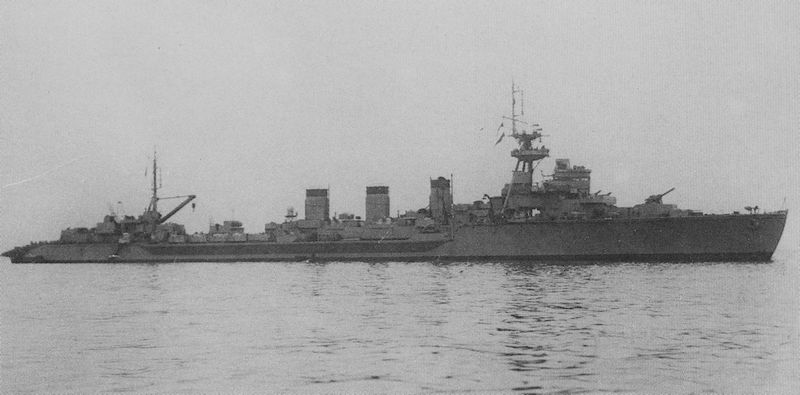
Kitakami on 20 January 1945 at Sasebo Naval Arsenal.

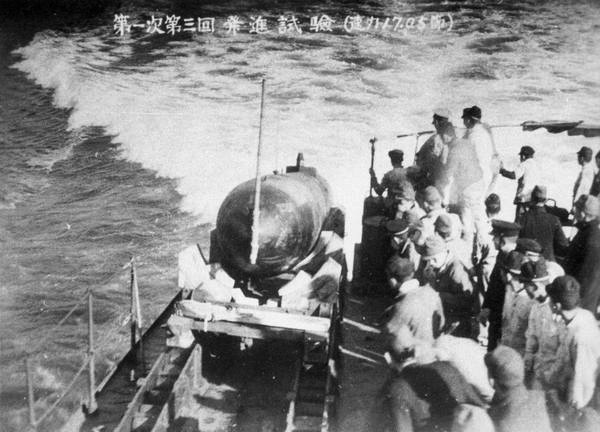
Kaiten Type 1 being first trial launched.

From 14 August 1944 Kitakami was repaired and modified at Sasebo Naval Arsenal into a Kaiten human torpedo carrier with a capacity for eight Kaiten. A 20-ton crane, formerly from the seaplane carrier Chitose, was fitted to raise and lower the Kaiten into the water. Her stern was remodeled into an overhanging ramp configuration and the aft turbines were removed as well, and the space used to hold spare parts and repair equipment. The removal of these turbines reduced Kitakami's top speed from 36 to 23 knots (67 to 43 km/h). All of Kitakami's remaining armaments were removed and replaced by two Type 89 127-mm AA guns and 67 Type 96 25-mm (twelve triple-mount and 31 single-mount) AA guns, two Type 13 air-search and one Type 22 surface-search radars. Two depth charge launching rails were installed at the stern and two depth charge throwers were also installed. The refit was completed on 20 January 1945, and Kitakami was reassigned directly to the Combined Fleet.

On 19 March 1945, American Task Force 58 aircraft carriers Essex, Intrepid, Hornet, Wasp, Hancock, Bennington and Belleau Wood made the first carrier attack of the war on Kure Naval Arsenal. More than 240 aircraft (Curtiss SB2C Helldivers, Vought F4U Corsairs and Grumman F6F Hellcats) attacked the battleships Hyūga, Ise, Yamato, Haruna, aircraft carriers Amagi, Katsuragi, Ryūhō, Kaiyō and other ships. Kitakami sustained no damage.

In July 1945, an additional twenty seven single mount Type 96 25-mm AA guns were fitted to Kitakami. However, on 24 July 1945 about 200 aircraft Task Force 38's Essex, Ticonderoga, Randolph, Hancock, Monterey and Bataan again attacked the Kure area. Kitakami was damaged by strafing and thirty-two crewmen were killed.

=== Post-war ===
After the surrender of Japan on 2 September 1945, Kitakami was moved to Kagoshima and assigned to the Repatriation Service. She was used as a repair tender for ships on repatriation duties.

Kitakami was removed from the navy list on 30 November 1945, and scrapped from 10 August 1946 – 31 March 1947.
