= 0Y =

0Y (zero Y) or 0-Y may refer to:

- 0 (year)
- 0y, the notation for zero yellow in CMYK

== See also ==
- OY (disambiguation)
- Y0 (disambiguation)
- Year Zero (disambiguation)
