= Ōi =

Ōi may refer to:

== Japanese geography ==
- Ōi, Fukui
- Ōi, Kanagawa
- Ōi, Saitama
- Ōi District, Fukui
- Ōi River, Shizuoka Prefecture
- Ōi River (Kyoto Prefecture), part of the Katsura River

== People with the surname ==
- Katsushika Ōi (c. 1800 – 1866), Japanese ukiyo-e artist
- Naoyuki Ōi (大井 直幸, born 1983), Japanese pool player

== Other uses ==
- Grey-faced petrel, also known by its Māori name Ōi
- Ōi (shogi), one of the eight titles of Japanese professional shogi (board game) tournament
- Ōi Dam, Gifu Prefecture, Japan
- Japanese cruiser Ōi, a former cruiser in the Imperial Japanese Navy

== See also ==
- Ooi – In some romanizations, ōi is sometimes written as ooi
- Oi (disambiguation)
