= Nishizō Tsukahara =

Admiral in the Imperial Japanese Navy during World War II

- 塚原 二四三
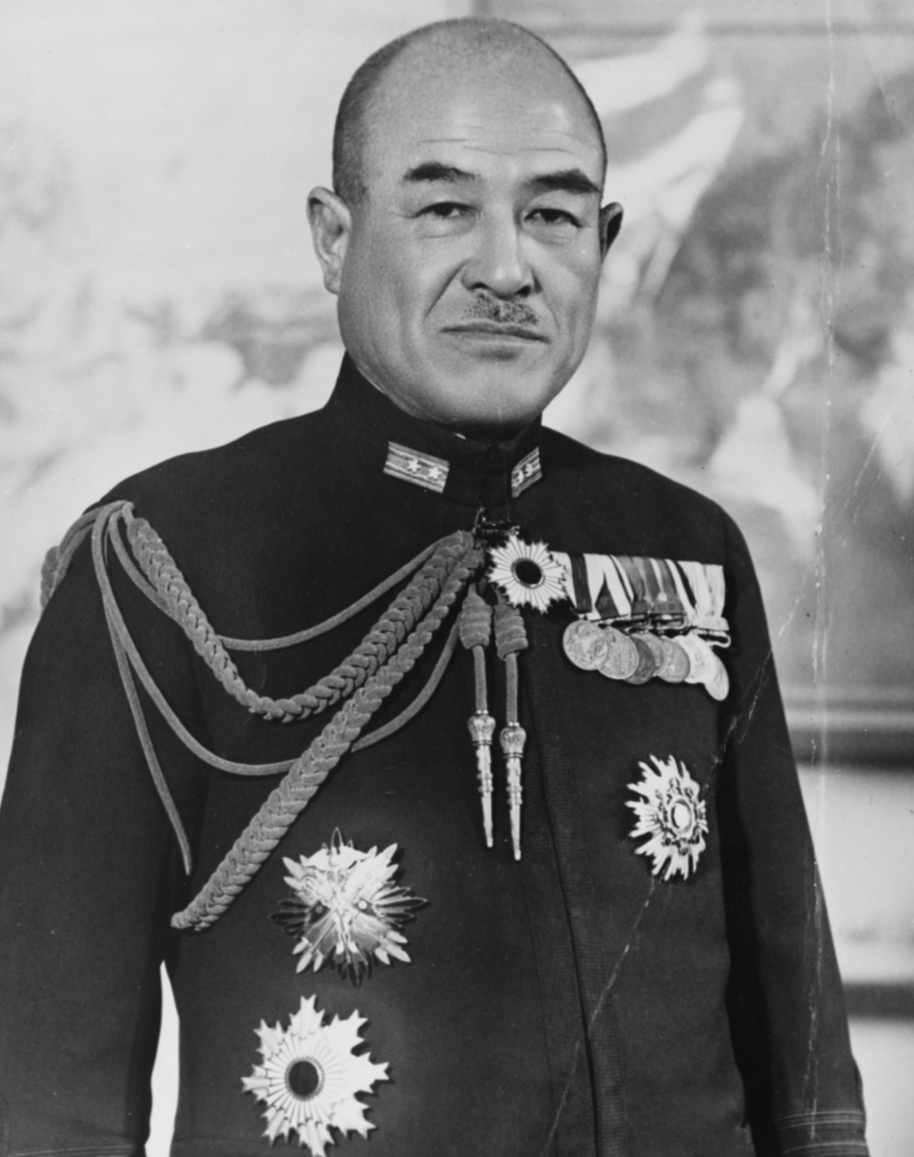
- Born: April 3, 1887; Fukui Prefecture, Japan
- Died: January 10, 1966 (aged 78); Tokyo, Japan
- Military career
- Allegiance: Empire of Japan
- Branch: Imperial Japanese Navy
- Service years: 1908–1945
- Rank: Admiral
- Commands: Ōi, Akagi, 2nd Carrier Division, 2nd Combined Air Group, 1st Combined Air Group, Chinkai Guard District, 11th Air Fleet, Naval Aviation Bureau, Senior Vice-chief of Navy General Staff, Naval Councillor, Yokosuka Naval District
- Conflicts: World War II; Pacific War; Malayan campaign; Battle of the Philippines (1941-42); New Guinea campaign; Battle of Makassar Strait; Guadalcanal campaign; Solomon Islands campaign
- Awards: Grand Cordon of the Order of the Sacred Treasure; Order of the Golden Kite, Second Class; Order of the Rising Sun, Second Class

Nishizō Tsukahara (塚原 二四三, Tsukahara Nishizō; April 3, 1887 – January 10, 1966), was an admiral in the Imperial Japanese Navy during World War II.

== Biography ==
Tsukahara was born in Fukui Prefecture, but his official residence was Kofu city, Yamanashi Prefecture, where he was raised. Tsukahara graduated from the 36th class of the Imperial Japanese Naval Academy in 1908. He was ranked 20th out of 119 cadets, and noted Admiral Chuichi Nagumo was his classmate. He served his midshipman duty aboard the cruisers Soya, and Iwate and battleship Okinoshima. After he was commissioned as an ensign in 1910, he was assigned to the Shikishima, followed by destroyer Yūdachi.

Tsukahara subsequently served on the Yamashiro and cruiser Aso. After his promotion to lieutenant in 1914, he was assigned to Umikaze, and was chief navigator on Mogami in 1916, followed by Chitose, repair ship Kanto, and battlecruiser Ibuki.

Tsukahara graduated from the Navy Staff College in 1920, and was promoted to lieutenant commander. He held a number of staff positions within the Yokosuka Naval District, particularly pertaining to naval aviation. He was sent to the United States and Europe from 1925–1926, and on his return was assigned as executive officer to the aircraft carrier Hōshō.

On November 29, 1929, Tsukahara was promoted to captain, and was also given command of Ōi. From 1931-1932, he was part of the Japanese delegation to the Geneva Naval Disarmament Conference. On October 20, 1933, he was given command of the aircraft carrier Akagi.

Tsukahara was promoted to Rear admiral on November 15, 1935. He commanded a number of fighter squadrons, and was promoted on to Vice admiral on November 15, 1939. In April 1940, he became commander of the Chinkai Guard District, and from September 10, 1941 until October 1, 1942, he was Commander in Chief of the 11th Air Fleet. Unlike western military services where most military aircraft were under Army control, the Japanese Imperial Navy maintained large land-based aerial forces. In addition to seaplanes and maritime patrol aircraft, each of these Air Fleets had several wings of land-based fighters, dive bombers, torpedo bombers, and twin-engined medium bombers. The exact composition was tailored by the Imperial Japanese Navy Air Service to the location and mission. They also included a number of support ships for resupply and destroyers for protection of supply lanes.

Based out of Taiwan Island when the war began, the 11th Air Fleet was involved in the invasion of the Philippines. Later it moved forward in support of Japanese offensives in the New Guinea campaign, and fought some air vs. naval actions south of New Guinea on the eastern side of Indonesia during the Dutch East Indies campaign.

Afterwards the 11th Air Fleet with the help of its dedicated supporting ships moved forward and engaged in operations flying during the Solomon Islands campaign from Rabaul, New Britain and other locations. On August 8, 1942, after the Allied landings on Guadalcanal and Tulagi Tsukahara moved to Rabaul to more closely direct air attacks against Allied forces around Guadalcanal. While at Rabaul, the scope of Vice admiral Tsukahara's command was expanded to include all naval forces in the New Guinea and Solomon Islands' area in addition to the 11th Air Fleet in what was renamed the Southeast Area Command. Soon after this change he fell ill, was relieved and replaced in Rabaul by Vice-Admiral Jin'ichi Kusaka on October 1, 1942.

After recovering from illness, Tsukahara was appointed Director of Naval Air Command from December 1, 1942 to September 15, 1944. Subsequently, he was commander in chief of the Yokosuka Naval District to May 1, 1945.

Tsukahara was promoted to (full) Admiral on May 15, 1945, one of the last two officers promoted to this rank. He died in 1966, and his grave is at the Tama Reien Cemetery in Fuchū, Tokyo.

== Notes ==
IJN Insignia	Rank	Date
	海軍少将 Kaigun Shōshō (Rear-Admiral)	15 November 1935
	海軍中将 Kaigun Chūjō (Vice-Admiral)	15 November 1939
	海軍大将 Kaigun Taishō (Admiral)	15 May 1945

Military offices
Preceded by Kobayashi Sōnosuke	Chinkai Naval Base; Commander; 15 April 1940 - 1 September 1941	Succeeded by Sakamoto Ikuta
Preceded by Katagiri Eikichi	11th Air Fleet; Commander-in-chief; 10 September 1941 - 1 October 1942	Succeeded by Kusaka Jinichi
Preceded by	Naval Aviation Bureau; Director; 1 December 1942 – 15 September 1944	Succeeded by
Preceded by Nomura Naokuni	Yokosuka Naval District; Commander-in-chief; 15 September 1944 - 1 May 1945	Succeeded by Tozuka Michitarō
