= Øye =

Øye may refer to the following locations:

- Øye, Innlandet, a village in Vang municipality, Innlandet county, Norway
- Øye Stave Church, a church in Vang municipality, Innlandet county, Norway
- Øye, Rogaland, a village in Hjelmeland Municipality, Rogaland county, Norway

== See also ==
- Oye (disambiguation)
