= Ooi =

OOI or Ooi may refer to:

- Ocean Observatories Initiative, a National Science Foundation Division of Ocean Sciences program
- Huang (surname), a Chinese surname that is sometimes romanized as Ooi
- Oosterhoff type I (OoI), a category of globular clusters
- In Japanese, ōi is sometimes written as ooi
