= Kuma-class cruiser =

Light cruisers of the Imperial Japanese Navy

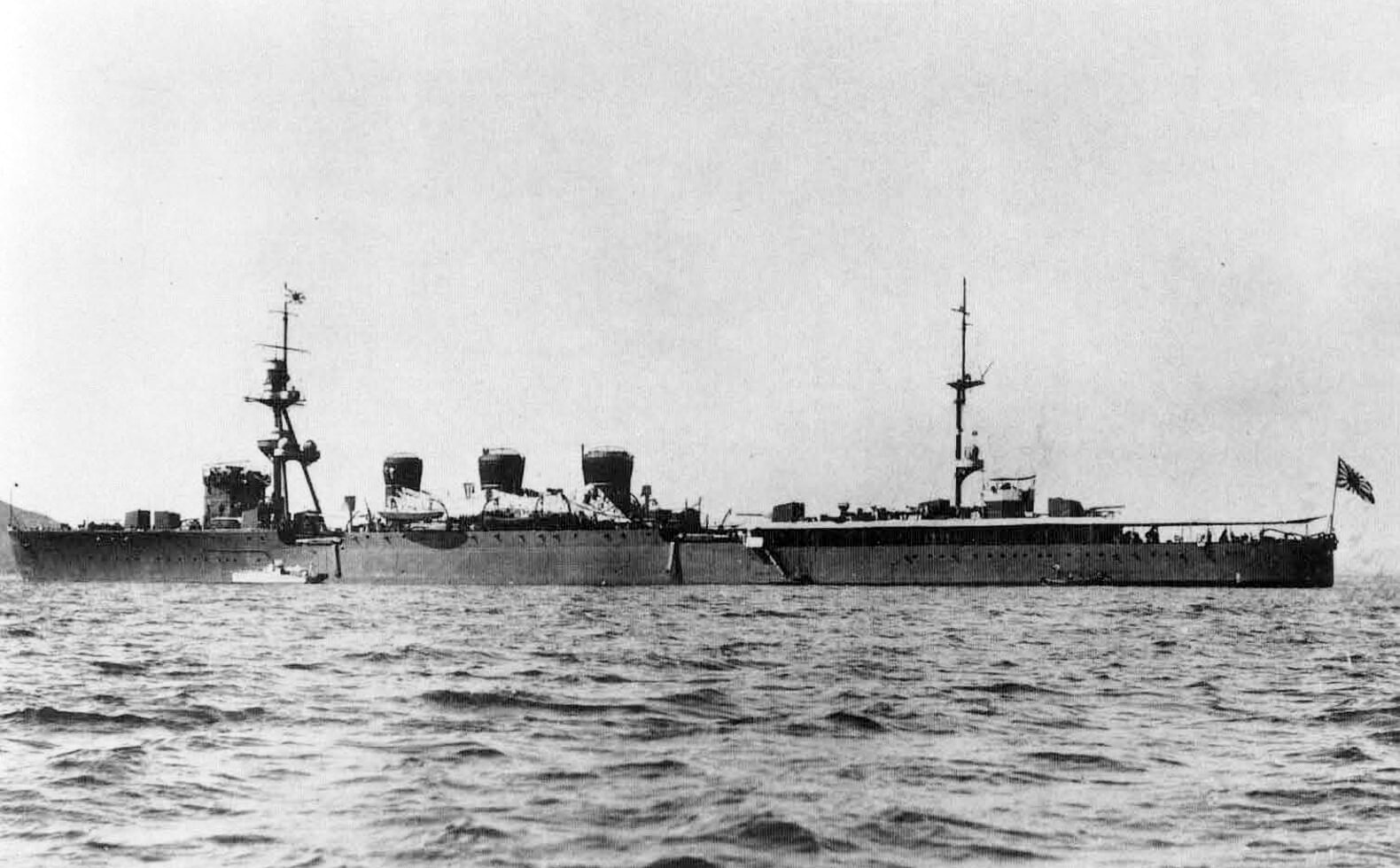
- Kuma off Tsingtao, 1930

Class overview
- Name: Kuma class
- Builders: Sasebo Naval Arsenal (2); Mitsubishi Shipbuilding, Nagasaki (2); Kawasaki Dockyard, Kobe (1)
- Operators: Imperial Japanese Navy
- Preceded by: Tenryū class
- Succeeded by: Nagara class
- Built: 1917–1921
- In commission: 1920–1946
- Planned: 5
- Completed: 5
- Lost: 4

General characteristics
- Type: Light cruiser
- Displacement: 5,500 long tons (5,588 t) normal; 5,832 long tons (5,926 t) full load
- Length: 162.1 m (531 ft 10 in) o/a; 158.6 m (520 ft 4 in) w/l
- Beam: 14.2 m (46 ft 7 in)
- Draft: 4.8 m (15 ft 9 in)
- Installed power: 154kW 110V electrical
- Propulsion: 4 shaft Gihon geared turbines; 12 Kampon boilers; 90,000 shp (67,000 kW)
- Speed: 36 knots (41 mph; 67 km/h)
- Range: 9,000 nmi (17,000 km) at 10 kn (12 mph; 19 km/h)
- Complement: 450
- Armament: 7 × 14 cm/50 3rd Year Type naval guns; 2 × 8 cm/40 3rd Year Type naval guns; 2 × 6.5mm light AA machine guns; 8 × 533 mm (21.0 in) torpedo tubes (4x2); 48 naval mines
- Armor: Belt: 60 mm (2.4 in); Deck: 30 mm (1.2 in)

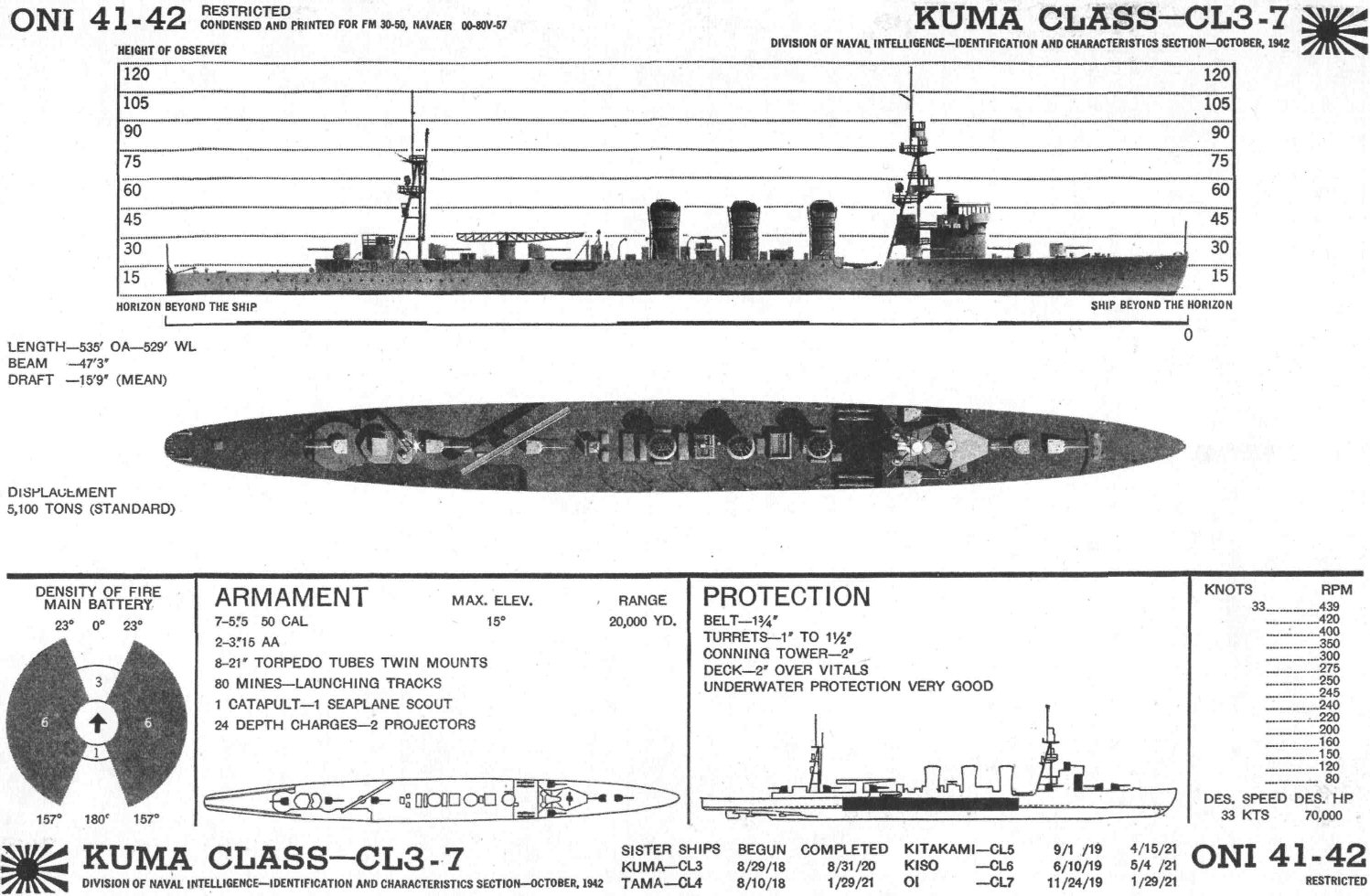
ONI drawing of the Kuma class

The Kuma-class light cruisers (球磨型軽巡洋艦, Kuma-gata keijun'yōkan) were a class of five light cruisers built for and operated by the Imperial Japanese Navy (IJN). The Kuma-class cruisers proved useful in combat operations ranging from the Aleutian Islands to the Indian Ocean throughout World War II.

The Kuma-class was followed by the very similar Nagara class.

== Background ==
Despite the success of the Tenryū-class high speed light cruiser design, the Imperial Japanese Navy realized that they would be outgunned by the larger US Navy Omaha class and the Dutch Java-class of light cruisers then under development. In addition, the Tenryū-class vessels, with a maximum speed of 33 knots (61 km/h; 38 mph), were unable to keep up with the newer Japanese destroyers, such as the Minekaze class, which had a design speed of 39 knots (72 km/h; 45 mph). At the end of 1917, plans for an additional six Tenryū-class vessels, plus three new-design 7200 ton-class scout cruisers were shelved, in place of an intermediate 5,500 ton-class vessel which could be used as both a long-range, high speed reconnaissance ship, and also as a command vessel for destroyer or submarine flotillas.

With the development of the long range oxygen-propelled Type 93 "Long Lance" torpedoes in the 1930s, the Imperial Japanese Navy General Staff drafted plans to create a special "Night Battle Force" of torpedo cruisers. The idea was based on Japan's success in the naval Battle of Port Arthur in the Russo-Japanese War. As the new Type 93 torpedoes had a range longer than that of contemporary battleships' main battery, the concept was to have a high speed strike force attack an enemy fleet at night with a massive and overwhelming barrage of torpedoes. Major surface combatants would follow up at dawn to finish off the wounded enemy.

Ōi and Kitakami were subsequently modified with ten quadruple mount torpedo launchers (a total of 40 tubes), arranged in two broadside rows of five, i.e. 20 per side. The ships were assigned to the CruDiv 9 of the IJN 1st Fleet. However, the rapid development of naval aviation and submarine warfare in the 1930s quickly made this plan obsolete. In January 1942, Chief of Staff Rear Admiral Matome Ugaki expressed strong disapproval of the newly remodeled torpedo cruisers and urged a revision to the Navy's tactics. While the Imperial Japanese Navy General Staff debated the issue, Ōi and Kitakami were converted to high speed transports, with Daihatsu-class landing craft, and Kitakami was subsequently converted into a carrier for kaiten suicide torpedoes.

== Design ==
The Kuma-class hull design was based on a 5,500 ton nominal displacement, with a high freeboard and light bridge structure, behind which was a tripod mast with the fire control platform and two searchlights. The design proved so versatile that it became the standard upon which all future light cruisers in the Japanese navy would be based.

The propulsion system for the Kuma class was based on four axial deceleration turbines with 12 boilers, providing 90,000 hp (67,000 kW). Ten boilers were designed to burn heavy oil, and the remaining two burned a mixture of coal and oil. With improvements in geared-turbine engine technology, the Kuma-class vessels were capable of the high speed of 36 knots (67 km/h), and a range of 9,000 nmi (17,000 km) at 10 kn (12 mph; 19 km/h). The silhouette of the Kuma class was discernible by its three smoke stacks, with the stacks flaring out in a trumpet shape.

The number of 14 cm/50 3rd Year Type naval guns was increased from four on the Tenryū class to seven on the Kuma class, centerline mounted in individual gun turrets, (two fore, three after and one on either side of the bridge). The positioning meant that only six of the guns could be brought to bear in a broadside. As with the Tenryū class, the Kuma class remained highly deficient in anti-aircraft protection, with only two 8 cm/40 3rd Year Type naval guns and two 6.5 mm machine guns. Provision was made for 48 naval mines. The two triple torpedo launchers on the Tenryū class was changed to four double launchers, placed in pairs so that four torpedoes could be fired on each side. Eight reloads were also provided.

Kiso was unique in that it had both a forward and aft flat surfaced superstructure, with a rotating floatplane take-off platform located aft. The platform appears to have never been used, and was removed in 1922, but her superstructure retained the shape of the hangar.

=== In service modifications ===
From 1931-1932, provision was made for a catapult to launch one floatplane (typically a Kawanishi E7K1 "Alf" floatplane ) for scouting purposes on Kuma and Tama. The catapult was situated aft, in between the No.5 and No.6 turrets.

From 1933-1934, the ships were renovated with a modified superstructure, replacing the canvas sides of the bridge with steel plate, and building a rangefinder tower behind the bridge was with either an 11.5-foot (3.5 m) or 13-foot (4.0 m) rangefinder. Kiso was also given anti-rain caps on her two forward stacks, which gave her a unique appearance.

By 1941, the 8-cm Type 3 guns were replaced by a twin-mount Type 96 25 mm AA guns, and the 6.5 mm machine guns were upgraded to 13.2 mm. All of the ships in the Kuma class were progressively upgraded during the Pacific War. The modifications varied from vessel to vessel, but consisted of removing the aircraft catapult and at least one of the main 140-mm turrets, and replacing with twin or triple-mount Type 96 25-mm anti-aircraft guns. From 1943-1944, Kiso and Tama were given a twin turret with 12.7 cm/40 Type 89 naval guns. Kiso, Tama and Kitakami were the only in the class to receive radar.

In August 1941 Ōi, Kitakami and Kiso were to undergo a conversion to torpedo cruisers to form a special torpedo attack squadron, but not enough Type 92 quadruple torpedo mounts were available so only the first two were converted, both ships three aft turrets were replaced by ten quadruple torpedo mounts, five per side, with a total of 40 torpedoes. In August 1942, they were modified into fast transports, with all of the torpedo tubes removed and replaced by Daihatsu class landing craft, with depth charge racks and two Type 96 triple-mount anti-aircraft guns.

After Kitakami was damaged in 1944, she was converted into a kaiten carrier, with all of her armament removed, and replaced by two Type 89 single gun turrets (fore and aft), a total of 67 Type 96 anti-aircraft guns(12 triple, 31 single), two depth charge racks and eight Model 1 Kaiten. Removal of the aft turbine engines reduced her speed to 23 knots.

== Ships History ==
Five vessels were built in the Kuma class. Only one (Kitakami) survived the Pacific War.

Kuma (球磨)
Ordered in 1917 to the Sasebo Naval Arsenal, launched 14 July 1919, and completed 31 August 1920, Kuma was active in screening the landings of Japanese troops in the Philippines in the early months of World War II, and remained stationed there for local defense. Later assigned to the Southwest Area Fleet in the Netherlands East Indies, she was refit at Singapore from October–November 1943. She was torpedoed by the submarine HMS Tally-Ho off the west coast of Malaya on 10 March 1944.
Tama (多摩)
Ordered in 1917 to Mitsubishi Shipbuilding & Engineering Company in Nagasaki, launched 10 February 1920, and completed 29 January 1921, Camouflaged in Arctic colors, Tama participated in the Aleutian Islands Campaign and the Battle of the Komandorski Islands and spent most of the early part of World War II in northern waters. She was later used as a fast transport and made numerous sorties to Rabaul and other locations in the Solomon Islands. After refit in Japan in late 1943, she remained in Japanese home waters until reassigned to the Imperial Japanese Navy’s all-out final defense of the Philippines in October 1944. She was at the Battle of Leyte Gulf, where she was damaged by USN aircraft and was torpedoed by USS Jallao northeast of the Philippines on 25 October 1944 while attempting to return to Okinawa.
Kitakami (北上)
Ordered in 1917 to the Sasebo Naval Arsenal, launched 3 July 1920, and completed 15 April 1921, Kitakami was converted into a torpedo cruiser under a short-lived Imperial Japanese Navy program, which was abandoned at the eve of World War II. She subsequently participated in Battle of Midway as part of the Aleutian screening force. She was later used as a fast transport and made numerous sorties to Rabaul and other locations in the Solomon Islands and New Guinea. From March 1943, she was assigned to the Southwest Area Fleet for escort and transport duties. After taking severe damage in a torpedo attack by the submarine HMS Templar on 27 January 1944, she returned to Japan for conversion to carrier for Kaiten human torpedoes, but never served in this capacity due to lack of fuel. She survived the end of the war, and was used as a tender for repatriation vessels after the war. She was scrapped from 10 August 1946 – 31 March 1947.
Ōi (大井)
Ordered in 1917 to the Kawasaki Dockyard Company in Kobe, launched 15 July 1920, and completed 3 November 1921, Ōi was converted into a torpedo cruiser under a short-lived Imperial Japanese Navy programme, which was abandoned at the eve of World War II. She subsequently participated in the Battle of Midway as part of the Aleutian screening force. She was later used as a fast transport and made numerous sorties to Rabaul and other locations in the Solomon Islands and New Guinea. From March 1943, she was assigned to the Southwest Area Fleet for escort and transport duties. She was torpedoed by the submarine USS Flasher west of Manila on 10 September 1944.
Kiso (木曾)
Ordered in 1917 to the Mitsubishi Shipbuilding & Engineering Company in Nagasaki, launched 14 December 1920, and completed 4 May 1921, Kiso participated in the Battle of the Aleutian Islands and spent most of the early part of World War II in northern waters. She was later used as a fast transport. After refit in Japan in late 1943, she remained in Japanese home waters until reassigned to the Imperial Japanese Navy’s all-out final defense of the Philippines in October 1944. She survived the Battle of Leyte Gulf, and was assigned guard duties in the Philippines. She was sunk by USN carrier-based aircraft west of Manila on 13 November 1944.

== Ships of the class ==
Construction data
Ship name	Namesake	Builder	Ordered	Launched	Completed	Sunk	Fate
Kuma (球磨)	Kuma River (球磨川, Kuma-gawa)	Sasebo Naval Arsenal in Sasebo	1917	14 July 1919	31 August 1920	11 January 1944	Torpedoed by HMS Tally-Ho 11 January 1944
Tama (多摩)	Tama River (多摩川, Tama-gawa)	Mitsubishi Shipbuilding & Engineering Company in Nagasaki	1917	10 February 1920	29 January 1921	25 October 1944	Torpedoed by USS Jallao 25 October 1944
Kitakami (北上)	Kitakami River (北上川, Kitakami-gawa)	Sasebo Naval Arsenal in Sasebo	1917	3 July 1920	15 April 1921		Scrapped from 10 August 1946 – 31 March 1947
Ōi (大井)	Ōi River (大井川, Ōi-gawa)	Kawasaki Dockyard Company in Kobe	1917	15 July 1920	3 November 1921	10 September 1944	Torpedoed by USS Flasher 10 September 1944
Kiso (木曾)	Kiso River (木曽川, Kiso-gawa)	Mitsubishi Shipbuilding & Engineering Company in Nagasaki	1917	14 December 1920	4 May 1921	13 November 1944	Sunk by USN carrier-based aircraft 13 November 1944
