= Oi =

Oi (also as OI) may refer to:

== In biology ==
- Grey-faced petrel, also known by its Māori name oi
- Orthostatic intolerance, a disorder of the autonomic nervous system
- Osteogenesis imperfecta, a group of genetic bone disorders

== In business ==
- Oi (telecommunications), the largest landline telephone company in Brazil
- Organizational intelligence, in business manage

== In linguistics ==
- Oi (digraph), a Latin-script digraph
- Oi (interjection), an interjection used to get someone's attention, or to express surprise or disapproval
- Oi language, a Mon–Khmer dialect cluster of southern Laos
- Gha, a letter (Ƣ ƣ) erroneously referred to by Unicode as "oi"

== In music ==
- Oi!, a subgenre of punk rock
- "Oi!" (song), a 2002 hit song for British grime music crew More Fire Crew

== Organisations ==
- Oi! (Hong Kong), a visual arts organisation in Hong Kong
- Oi (Indonesia), an Iwan Fals fanbase foundation in Indonesia
- Oriental Institute (disambiguation)
- Orphans International, a global charitable organization that benefits orphans and abandoned children

== Other uses ==
- Oi (general), Goguryeo general
- Japanese cruiser Ōi
- O-I, a Japanese tank design of the Second World War
- Organoid intelligence, a field of study related to computer science and biology
- Object Invasion, an American animated webseries from 2016-2020
- Object Insanity, an Irish animated webseries from 2014-2018
- Operating income

== See also ==
- Ōi (disambiguation), a number of places in Japan and the name of a light cruiser launched in 1920
- Aussie Aussie Aussie, Oi Oi Oi, an Australian chant
- Oi Oi Oi (album), an album by Boys Noize
- Oy (disambiguation)
- Hoy (disambiguation)
