= Y0 =

Y0 may refer to:

- year 0, first year
- Y0 class, a star class with brown dwarfs
- Yakuza 0

== See also ==
- 0Y (disambiguation)
- YO (disambiguation)
