= Japanese cruiser Ōi =

1920 Kuma-class cruiser

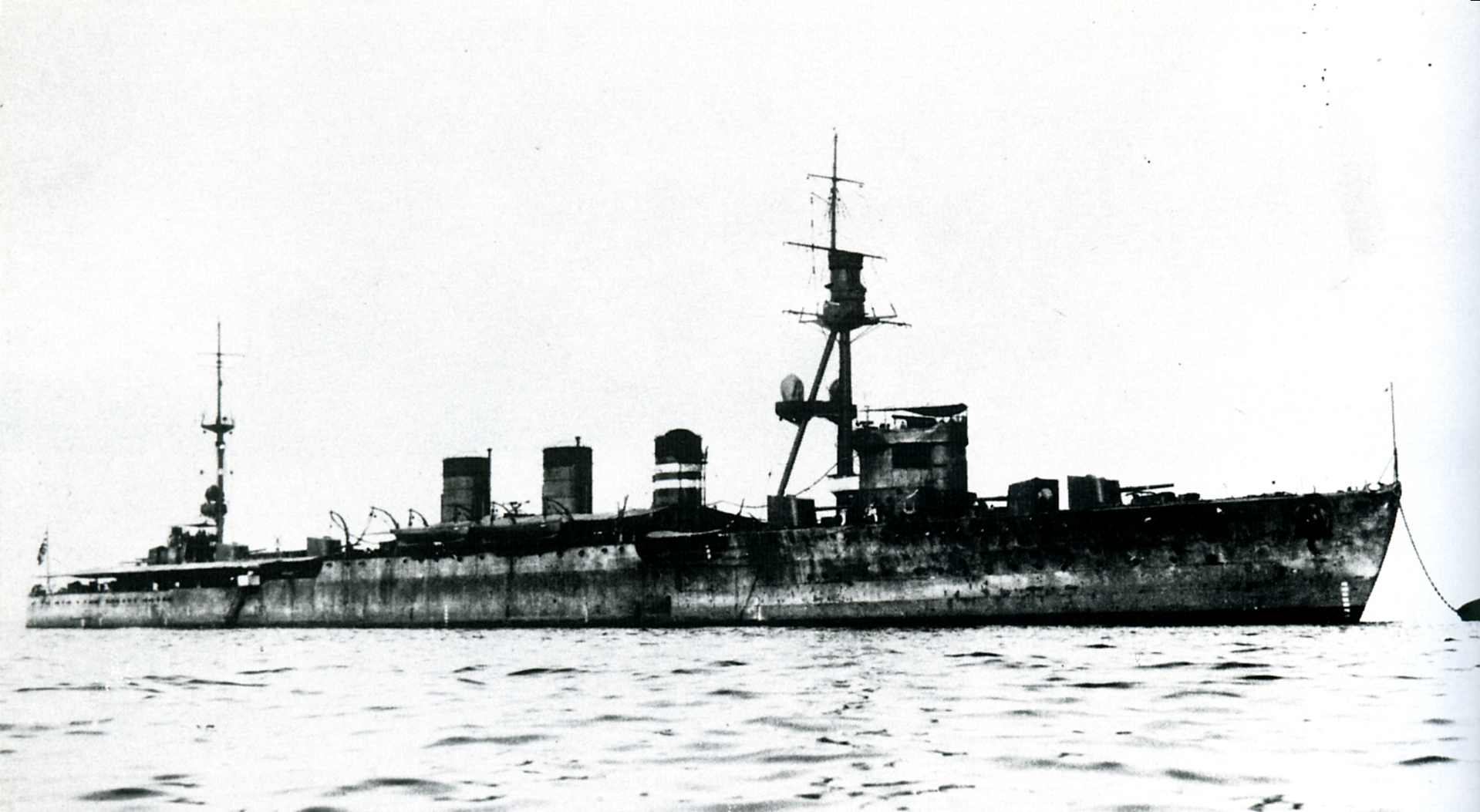
- Ōi in 1923 at Kure Harbor, Hiroshima

History

Empire of Japan
- Name: Ōi
- Namesake: Ōi River
- Ordered: 1917 Fiscal Year
- Builder: Kawasaki Shipbuilding, Kobe, Japan
- Laid down: 24 November 1919
- Launched: 15 July 1920
- Commissioned: 10 October 1921
- Out of service: 19 July 1944
- Stricken: 10 September 1944
- Fate: Torpedoed south of Hong Kong, South China Sea, 19 July 1944

General characteristics
- Class & type: Kuma-class light cruiser
- Displacement: 5,100 long tons (5,182 t) (standard)
- Length: 152.4 m (500 ft 0 in)
- Beam: 14.2 m (46 ft 7 in)
- Draft: 4.8 m (15 ft 9 in)
- Installed power: 90,000 shp (67,000 kW)
- Propulsion: 4 × Brown-Curtis geared steam turbines; 12 × Kampon boilers; 4 × shafts
- Speed: 36 kn (67 km/h; 41 mph)
- Range: 5,000 nmi (9,300 km; 5,800 mi) at 14 kn (26 km/h; 16 mph)
- Complement: 450
- Armament: (as built); 7 × 14 cm/50 3rd Year Type naval guns (7x1); 2 × 8 cm/40 3rd Year Type naval gun s; 8 × 533 mm (21.0 in) torpedo tubes (4x2); 48 × mines; (as torpedo cruiser); 4 × 14 cm/50 3rd Year Type naval guns; 6 × Type 96 25-mm AA guns (2 triple); 40 × 610 mm (24 in) torpedo tubes (10x4)
- Armor: Belt: 64 mm (3 in); Deck: 29 mm (1 in)
- Aircraft carried: 1 × floatplane
- Aviation facilities: 1 × catapult

Ōi (大井) was the fourth of five Kuma-class light cruiser, which served in the Imperial Japanese Navy during World War II. She was named after the Ōi River in Shizuoka prefecture, Japan. Designed as a command vessel for a destroyer squadron, she was converted into a torpedo cruiser with forty torpedo launch tubes in a plan abandoned by the Japanese Navy in 1942. During most of the Pacific War, she was used primarily as a fast troop transport and was sunk by a United States Navy submarine in 1944.

== Background ==
After the construction of the Tenryū-class cruisers, the demerits of the small cruiser concept became apparent. At the end of 1917, plans for an additional six Tenryū-class vessels, plus three new-design 7,200 long tons (7,316 t)-class scout cruisers were shelved, in place of an intermediate 5,500 long tons (5,588 t)-class vessel which could be used as both a long-range, high speed reconnaissance ship, and also as a command vessel for destroyer or submarine flotillas. Kuma was the lead ship of the five vessels in this class which were built from 1918-1921.

== Design ==
The Kuma-class vessels were essentially enlarged versions of the Tenryū-class cruisers, with greater speed, range, and weaponry.

With improvements in geared-turbine engine technology, the Kuma-class vessels were capable of the high speed of 36 kn (67 km/h; 41 mph), and a range of 9,000 nmi (17,000 km; 10,000 mi) at 10 kn (19 km/h; 12 mph). The number of 14 cm/50 3rd Year Type naval guns was increased from three on the Tenryū class to seven on the Kuma class and provision was made for 48 naval mines. However, the two triple torpedo launchers on the Tenryū class was reduced to two double launchers, and the Kuma class remained highly deficient in anti-aircraft protection, with only two 8 cm/40 3rd Year Type naval guns .

== Service career ==
=== Early career ===
Ōi was completed at Kawasaki Yards at Kobe on 4 May 1921. From 1928-1931, she was assigned to be a training ship at the Imperial Japanese Navy Academy in Etajima, Hiroshima, and was commanded by Captain Nishizō Tsukahara from November 1929 to December 1930 and by Captain Masaichi Niimi from April to October 1931. At the time of the Shanghai Incident of 1932, Ōi was reassigned to patrols of the China coast, but she resumed her training role from the end of 1933 to mid-1937. After August 1937, as the Second Sino-Japanese War continued to escalate, Ōi (under the command of Captain Kiyohide Shima) was assigned to cover the landings of Japanese forces in central China, but it was again assigned to training duties from December 1937 through the end of 1939.

On 25 August 1941, Ōi returned to Maizuru Naval Arsenal for conversion to a torpedo cruiser with 10 quadruple mount torpedo launchers (a total of 40 tubes), housing long-range oxygen-propelled Type 93 "Long Lance" torpedoes arranged in two broadside rows of five, i.e. 20 per side. Modifications were completed on 30 September, and Ōi was assigned to the CruDiv 9 of the IJN 1st Fleet together with her sister ship Kitakami.

=== Early stages of the Pacific War ===
During the attack on Pearl Harbor of 7 December 1941, Ōi escorted the battleship force of the Combined Fleet from its anchorage at Hashirajima in Hiroshima Bay to the Bonin Islands and back.

On 12 January 1942, Chief of Staff Rear Admiral Matome Ugaki inspected Ōi, and expressed strong disapproval of the Navy's plans for the use of the newly remodeled torpedo cruisers and urged a revision to the Navy's tactics. While the Imperial Japanese Navy General Staff debated the issue, Ōi was assigned to escorting transports between Hiroshima and Mako, Pescadores Islands from the end of January through mid-April.

On 29 May, during the Battle of Midway, Ōi was part of Vice Admiral Shirō Takasu's (Aleutian Screening) force, and returned safely to Yokosuka Naval District on 17 June.

=== As a fast transport ===
From August–September, Ōi and Kitakami were converted into fast transports. Their 10 quadruple torpedo tubes were reduced to six, for a total of 24 tubes. They were equipped with two Daihatsu-class landing craft and fitted with two triple-mount Type 96 25 mm AA guns. Depth charge launching rails were also installed. Ōi was then used to transport the Maizuru No. 4 Special Naval Landing Force to Truk in the Caroline Islands .

From the end of October through most of December, Ōi ferried troops and supplies from Truk and Manila to Rabaul, New Britain and Buin, Bougainville. On 21 November, CruDiv 9 was disbanded and Ōi was assigned directly to the Combined Fleet. On 24 December, Ōi returned to Kure Naval Arsenal for maintenance.

From 12 January 1943, Ōi participated in the operation to reinforce Japanese forces in New Guinea. She ferried a convoy with the Imperial Japanese Army (IJA)'s 20th Infantry Division from Pusan to Wewak, New Guinea via Palau in January, and a convoy with the 41st Infantry Division from Qingdao to Wewak in February.

On 15 March, Ōi was assigned to the Southwest Area Fleet and was assigned to escort two convoys from Surabaya to Kaimana, New Guinea in April, and from Surabaya to Ambon and Kaimana in May. While at Makassar on 23 June, she was attacked by Consolidated Aircraft B-24 Liberator heavy bombers of the United States Army Air Forces 5th Air Force's 319th Bombardment Squadron, but she was not damaged.

On 1 July, Ōi was assigned to CruDiv 16 of the Southwest Area Fleet, and was based at Surabaya as a guard ship. After patrols in the Java Sea, she was repaired at Seletar Naval Base, Singapore in August.

=== Operations in the Indian Ocean ===
From the end of August 1943 to the end of January 1944, Ōi and Kitakami made four troop transport runs from Singapore and Penang to the Andaman Islands and Nicobar Islands in the Indian Ocean.

From 27 February, Ōi, together with light cruiser Kinu and destroyers Uranami, Amagiri and Shikinami, was assigned to escort the heavy cruisers Tone, Chikuma and Aoba for commerce raiding in the Indian Ocean, but in general remained in the vicinity of Singapore and Balikpapan and Tarakan in Borneo until the end of April. During the month of May, Ōi was primarily involved in troop transport operations between Tarakan, Palau and Sorong, and in June she was reassigned to patrols in the Java Sea.

On 6 July, Ōi departed Surabaya for Manila. On 19 July, she was sighted in the South China Sea, 570 nmi (1,060 km; 660 mi) south of Hong Kong by the United States Navy submarine USS Flasher. When the cruiser was 1,400 yd (1,300 m) astern, Flasher fired her four stern tubes, hitting Ōi with two torpedoes portside aft. One was a dud, but the other torpedo exploded and flooded Ōi's aft engine room. Flasher then fired four bow torpedoes from 3,500 yd (3,200 m), but all missed. At 17:25, Ōi sank by the stern at 13°12′N 114°52′E. The destroyer Shikinami, which had attempted to tow the stricken cruiser to safety before she broke in two and sank, rescued Captain Shiba and 368 crewmen, but another 153 crewmen went down with the ship.

Ōi was removed from the navy list on 10 September 1944.
