= HMS Templar =

Submarine of the Royal Navy

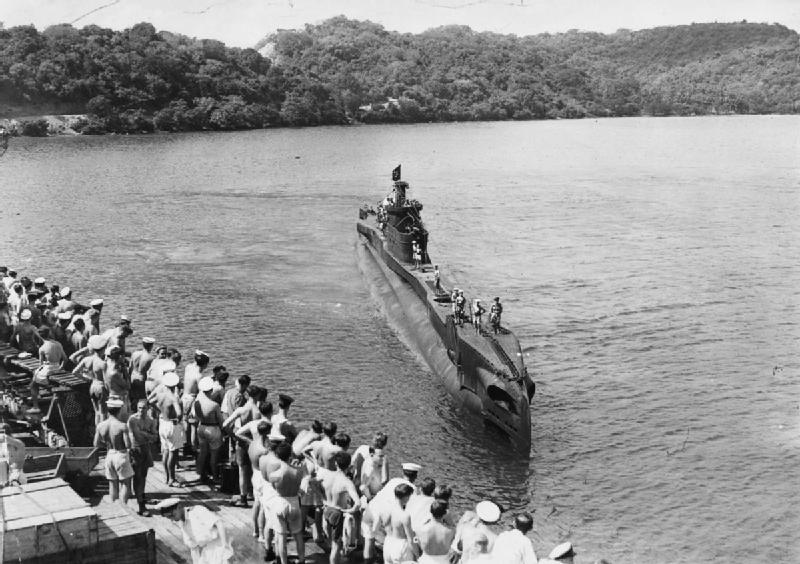
- HMS Templar

History

United Kingdom
- Name: HMS Templar
- Builder: Vickers-Armstrongs, Barrow
- Laid down: 28 December 1941
- Launched: 26 October 1942
- Commissioned: 15 February 1943
- Identification: Pennant number P316
- Fate: Sunk as target 1954, scrapped July 1959
- Badge

General characteristics
- Class & type: T-class submarine
- Displacement: 1,290 tons surfaced; 1,560 tons submerged
- Length: 276 ft 6 in (84.28 m)
- Beam: 25 ft 6 in (7.77 m)
- Draught: 12 ft 9 in (3.89 m) forward; 14 ft 7 in (4.45 m) aft
- Propulsion: Two shafts; Twin diesel engines 2,500 hp (1,900 kW) each; Twin electric motors 1,450 hp (1,080 kW) each
- Speed: 15.5 kn (28.7 km/h; 17.8 mph) surfaced; 9 kn (17 km/h; 10 mph) submerged
- Range: 4,500 nmi (8,300 km; 5,200 mi) at 11 kn (20 km/h; 13 mph) surfaced
- Test depth: 300 ft (91 m) max
- Complement: 61
- Armament: 6 internal forward-facing 21-inch (533 mm) torpedo tubes; 2 external forward-facing torpedo tubes; 2 external amidships rear-facing torpedo tubes; 1 external rear-facing torpedo tubes; 6 reload torpedoes; 1 x 4-inch (102 mm) deck gun; 3 anti aircraft machine guns

HMS Templar was a British submarine of the third group of the T class. She was built by Vickers-Armstrongs at Barrow-in-Furness, and launched on 26 October 1942 with the pennant number P316. So far she has been the only ship of the Royal Navy to bear the name Templar, probably after the crusading order, the Knights Templar.

== Service ==
Templar served in the Far East for much of her wartime career, where she sank the Japanese merchant cargo ship Tyokai Maru and laid mines. She torpedoed and damaged the Japanese light cruiser Kitakami, and attacked the U-1062 but missed her with torpedoes.

She survived the war and continued in service with the Navy, finally being used as a target and sunk in Loch Striven, Scotland in 1954. She was salvaged on 4 December 1958 and arrived at Troon, Scotland on 19 July 1959 to be scrapped.
