= Japanese aircraft carrier Hōshō =

Aircraft carrier of the Imperial Japanese Navy

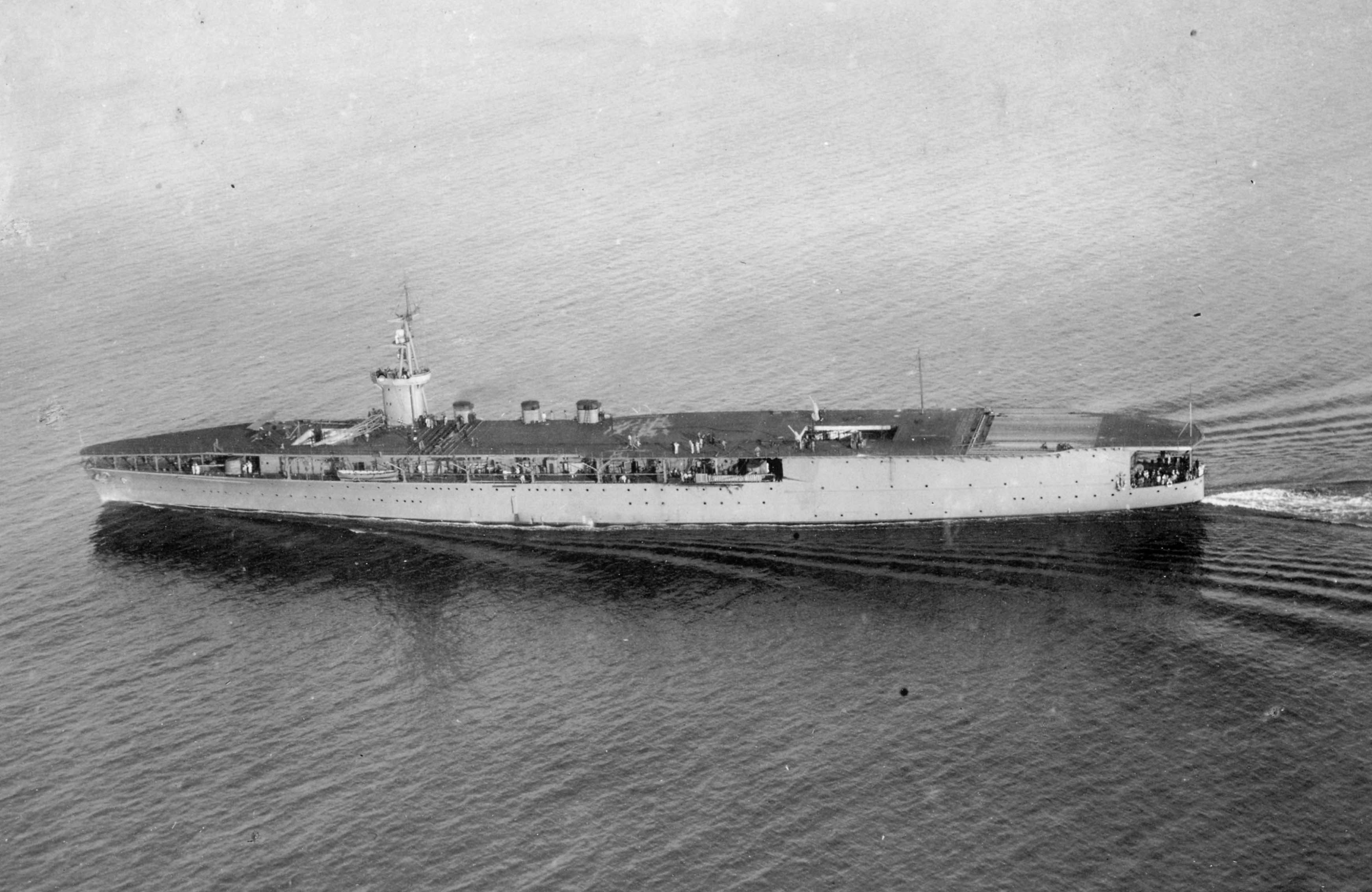
- Aerial view of Hōshō as completed in December 1922

Class overview
- Operators: Imperial Japanese Navy
- Preceded by: None
- Succeeded by: Akagi
- Built: 1920–1922
- In service: 1922–1946
- In commission: 1922–1945
- Planned: 2
- Completed: 1
- Scrapped: 1

History

Japan
- Name: Hōshō
- Namesake: Phoenix
- Builder: Asano Shipbuilding Company, Tsurumi-ku, Yokohama
- Laid down: 16 December 1920
- Launched: 13 November 1921
- Commissioned: 27 December 1922
- Stricken: 5 October 1945
- Fate: Scrapped beginning 2 September 1946

General characteristics (as built)
- Type: Aircraft carrier
- Displacement: 7,470 long tons (7,590 t) (standard); 9,494 long tons (9,646 t) (normal)
- Length: 168.25 m (552 ft)
- Beam: 17.98 m (59 ft)
- Draught: 6.17 m (20 ft 3 in) (mean)
- Installed power: 8 small-tube boilers; 30,000 shp (22,000 kW)
- Propulsion: 2 shafts; 2 geared steam turbines
- Speed: 25 knots (46 km/h; 29 mph)
- Range: 8,680 nmi (16,080 km; 9,990 mi) at 12 knots (22 km/h; 14 mph)
- Complement: 512
- Armament: 4 × single 14 cm (5.5 in) guns; 2 × single 8 cm (3 in) AA guns
- Aircraft carried: 15

Hōshō (Japanese: 鳳翔; meaning "Soaring Phoenix") was the world's first commissioned ship that was built as an aircraft carrier, (Note: HMS Argus pre-dated Hōshō and had a long landing deck, but was designed and initially built as an ocean liner. The first purpose-designed aircraft carrier to be laid down was HMS Hermes in 1918, but she was completed after Hōshō.) and the first aircraft carrier of the Imperial Japanese Navy (IJN). Commissioned in 1922, the ship was used for testing carrier aircraft operations equipment, techniques, such as take-offs and landings, and carrier aircraft operational methods and tactics. The ship provided valuable lessons and experience for the IJN in early carrier air operations. Hōshō's superstructure and other obstructions to the flight deck were removed in 1924 on the advice of experienced aircrews.

Hōshō and her aircraft group participated in the Shanghai Incident in 1932 and in the opening stages of the Sino-Japanese War in late 1937. During those two conflicts, the carrier's aircraft supported Imperial Japanese Army ground operations and engaged in aerial combat with aircraft of the Nationalist Chinese Air Force. The small size of the ship and her assigned airgroups (usually around 15 aircraft) limited the effectiveness of her contributions to combat operations. As a result, the carrier was placed in reserve after her return to Japan from China and she became a training ship in 1939.

During World War II, Hōshō participated in the Battle of Midway in June 1942 in a secondary role. After the battle, the carrier resumed her training role in Japanese home waters for the duration of the conflict and survived the war with only minor damage from air attacks. She was surrendered to the Allies at the end of the war and used to repatriate Japanese troops until she was scrapped in 1946.

== Design and description ==
Construction of a seaplane carrier was authorized by the Japanese government in its "eight-six" fleet program of 1918. A planned sister ship, named Shokaku, was cancelled in 1922 before any construction started. (Note: Gardiner and Gray and Jentschura, Jung, and Mickel state that Hōshō was initially laid down as a tanker named Hiryu. According to Milanovich, this is only partially correct at best. The ship was ordered as one of six Special Ships (Tokumukan) as part of the "eight-six" fleet program; the other five ships were completed as oil tankers.) Hōshō was the second warship, after the British HMS Hermes, to be built from the keel up as an aircraft carrier, but was launched and completed earlier than Hermes.

Hōshō was initially designed as a seaplane carrier like HMS Campania with a forward flying-off deck, 32 aircraft, four low-angle 14-centimeter (5.5 in) guns, and four anti-aircraft (AA) guns. The plan was revised after reports were received from Japanese observers with the Royal Navy in Europe about the desirability to be able to land aircraft on the ship. The new requirements were modeled on HMS Furious after she received her rear flight deck in 1918. The ship was to be capable of 30 knots (56 km/h; 35 mph) and fitted with a forward flight deck, island and funnels amidships, and a large hangar aft. Shortly thereafter based on observations of landing trials on Furious and HMS Argus, the world's first flush-decked aircraft carrier, Hōshō's flight deck design was revised in April 1919. The island was removed and the funnels were moved to one side to create an unobstructed, full-length flight deck, and the ship was reclassified as an aircraft carrier. The ship's hull was based on that of a large cruiser and she was given a small island. Her three funnels were mounted on the starboard side and swiveled to lie horizontal during flight operations. Hōshō's designed speed was reduced to 25 knots (46 km/h; 29 mph), based on British experiences during World War I.

=== General characteristics ===
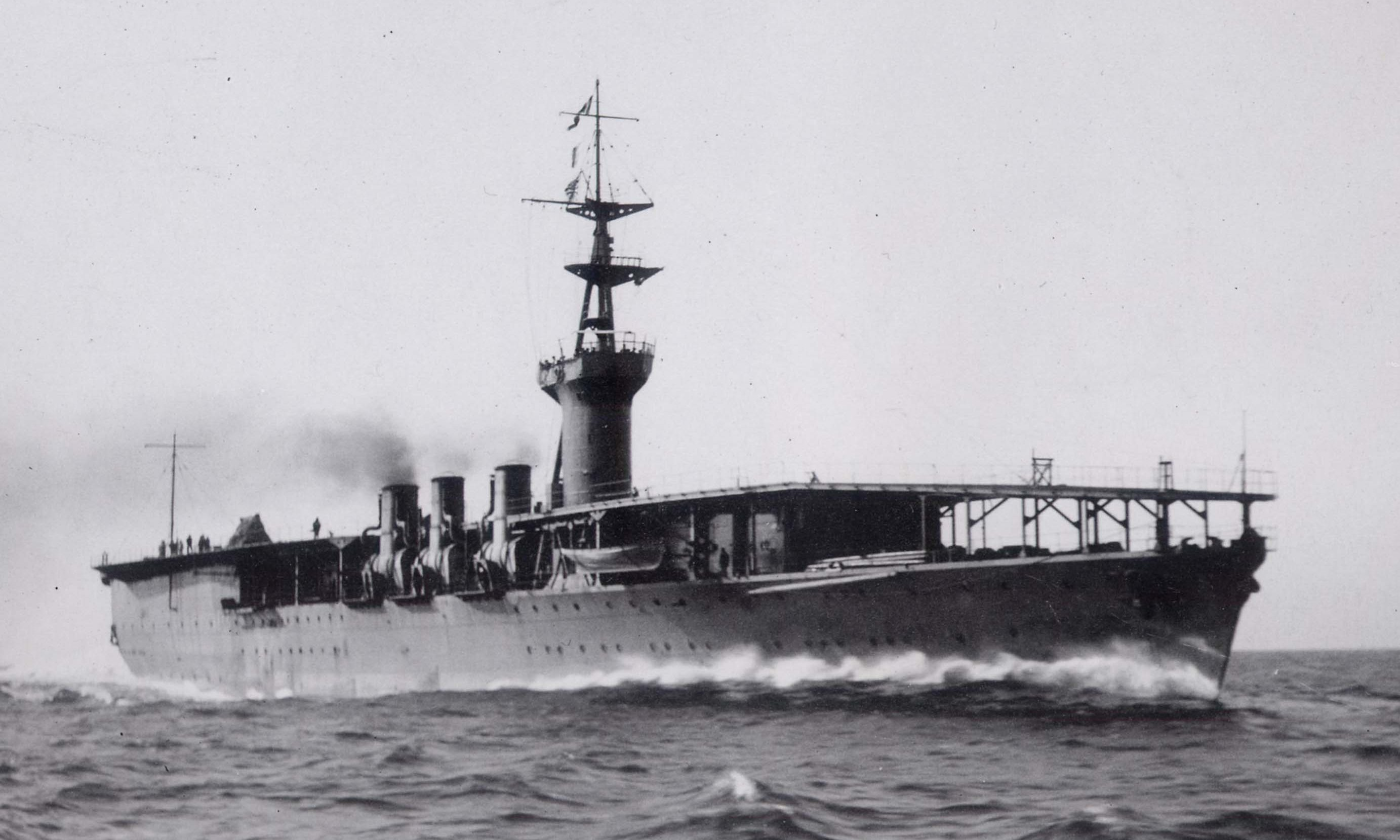
Hōshō conducts full-power trials with funnels swiveled up near Tateyama, Japan, on 4 December 1922

Hōshō was completed with an overall length of 168.25 meters (552 ft). She had a beam of 17.98 meters (59 ft) and a mean draft of 6.17 meters (20 ft 3 in). The ship displaced 7,470 long tons (7,590 t) at standard load, and 9,494 long tons (9,646 t) at normal load. Her crew totaled 512 officers and men. The ship was almost completely unarmored.

=== Propulsion ===
Hōshō had two Parsons geared turbine sets with a total of 30,000 shaft horsepower (22,000 kW) driving two propeller shafts. Eight Kampon Type B water-tube boilers with a working pressure of 18.3 kg/cm^{2} (1,790 kPa; 260 psi) and a temperature of 138 °C (280 °F) provided steam to the turbines, although only four were oil-fired. The other four used a mix of oil and coal. The ship's designed speed was 25 knots, but she made 26.66 knots (49.37 km/h; 30.68 mph) from 31,117 shp (23,204 kW) on her sea trials on 30 November 1922. She carried 2,700 long tons (2,740 t) of fuel oil and 940 long tons (960 t) of coal, an extraordinary total for such a small ship, to give her a range of 8,680 nautical miles (16,080 km; 9,990 mi) at 12 knots (22 km/h; 14 mph).

To reduce rolling and increase stability for aircraft operations, a gyrostabilizer produced by the American Sperry Gyroscope Company was installed. The installation initially proved unreliable as the Japanese technicians were badly trained by Sperry, but eventually the system proved its worth as the technicians gained experience.

=== Flight deck arrangements ===
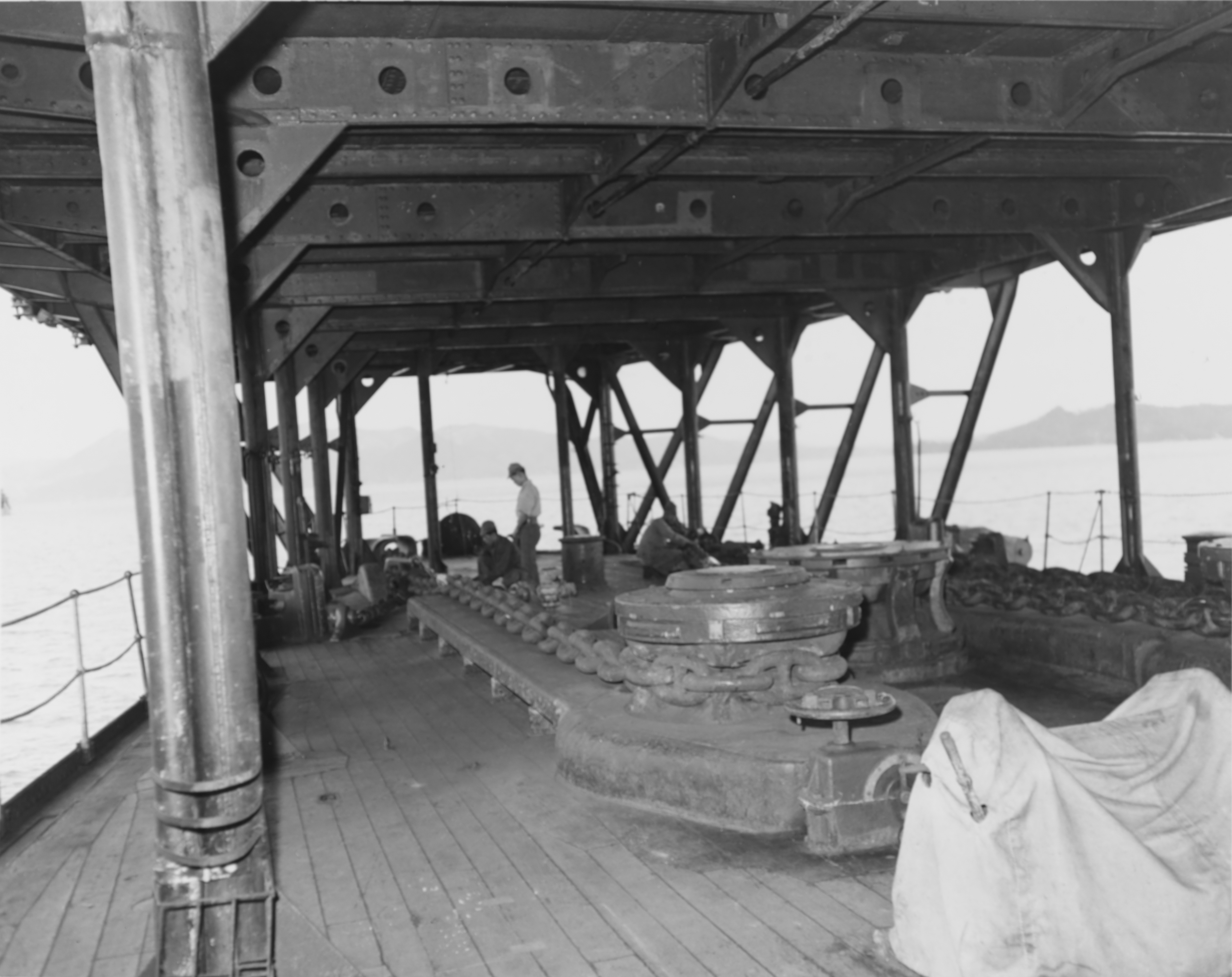
A view of the underside of Hōshō's narrow flight deck looking from the forecastle forward, October 1945

Hōshō's flight deck was 168.25 meters (552 ft) long and 22.62 meters (74 ft 3 in) wide. The forward end sloped down at an angle of −5° to help aircraft accelerate during takeoff. A small island was mounted well forward on the starboard side and contained the ship's bridge and air-operations control center. The island was fitted with a small tripod mast intended to carry the ship's fire-control system. Fifteen different types of arresting gear were evaluated before the British longitudinal wire system was adopted. Low landing speeds of the time meant that aircraft had little difficulty in stopping, but their light weight made them vulnerable to wind gusts that could blow them over the side of the carrier, and the longitudinal wires helped to prevent that. Forward of the island was a collapsible crane for loading aircraft into the forward hangar.

The flight deck, unlike those on Royal Navy carriers, was superimposed on the ship's hull rather than constructed as a strength deck supporting the carrier's hull structure. A system of lights and mirrors along the flight deck assisted pilots in landing on the carrier.

Hōshō was the only Japanese aircraft carrier with two hangars. The forward hangar was 67.2 by 9.5 meters (220 ft 6 in by 31 ft 2 in) and only one deck in height as it was intended to house nine small aircraft, such as fighters. The two-story rear hangar measured 16.5 by 14 meters (54 ft 2 in by 45 ft 11 in) at the forward end and 29.4 by 12 meters (96 ft 5 in by 39 ft 4 in) at the rear end. It was designed to house six large aircraft, such as torpedo bombers, as well as six reserve aircraft. Each hangar was served by an aircraft elevator. The forward elevator was 10.35 by 7.86 meters (34.0 by 25.8 ft) and the aft elevator measured 13.71 by 6.34 meters (45 ft 0 in by 20 ft 10 in).

=== Air group ===
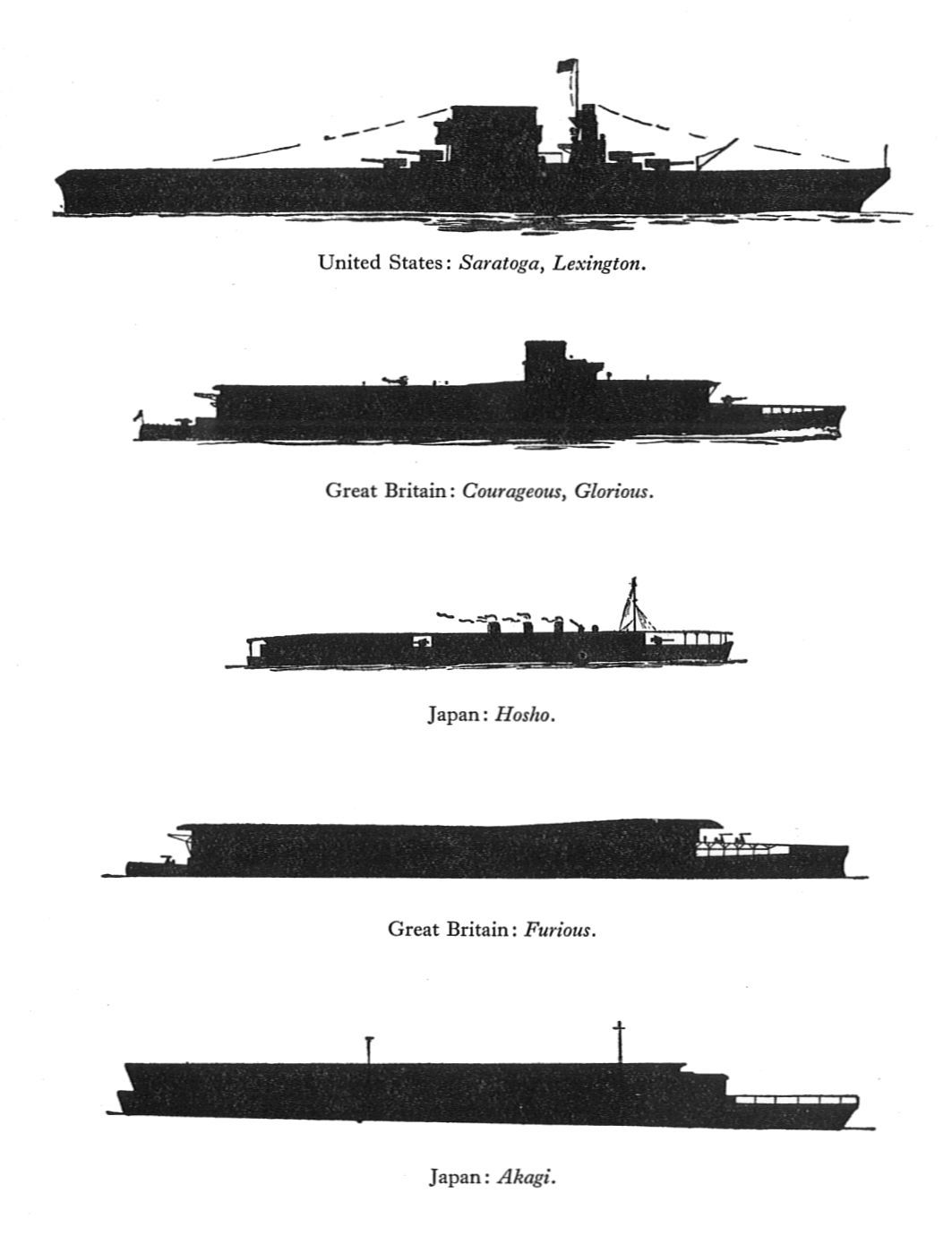
Hōshō (middle) compared with other aircraft carriers constructed during the same time period

Hōshō had a normal capacity of fifteen aircraft, subject to the limitations of her hangars. She was first commissioned with an air group of nine Mitsubishi 1MF (Type 10) fighters and three to six Mitsubishi B1M3 (Type 13) torpedo bombers. In 1928, the fighters were replaced by the A1N1 (Type 3). Three years later the air group consisted of Nakajima A2N (Type 90) fighters and Mitsubishi B2M (Type 89) torpedo bombers. In 1938 Nakajima A4N (Type 95) fighters and Yokosuka B3Y (Type 92) bombers flew from the ship. In 1940 the air group was modernized with Mitsubishi A5M (Type 96) "Claude" fighters and Yokosuka B4Y1 (Type 96) "Jean" bombers.

=== Armament ===
Hōshō was armed with four 50-caliber 14 cm/50 3rd Year Type guns, two on each side. The two forward guns had a firing arc of 150°, including straight ahead, while the rear guns could fire 120° on either side. They fired 38-kilogram (84 lb) projectiles at a rate of six to ten rounds per minute with a muzzle velocity of about 850 m/s (2,800 ft/s); at 35°, they had a maximum range of 19,750 m (21,600 yd). A heavy gun armament was provided for Hōshō; as carrier doctrine was just evolving at this time, the impracticability of carriers engaging in gun duels had not yet been realized. Her large flight deck and lack of armor made her a vulnerable target in surface battles.

A pair of 40-caliber 8 cm/40 3rd Year Type guns on retractable mounts provided Hōshō's only anti-aircraft defense. They were positioned on the flight deck, just forward of the rear elevator. These guns fired 5.67–5.99-kilogram (12.5–13.2 lb) projectiles at a muzzle velocity of about 680 m/s (2,231 ft/s); at 45°, this provided a maximum range of 10,800 meters (11,800 yd), and they had a maximum ceiling of 7,200 meters (23,600 ft) at 75° elevation. Their effective rate of fire was 13 to 20 rounds per minute.

== Service ==
=== Early career ===
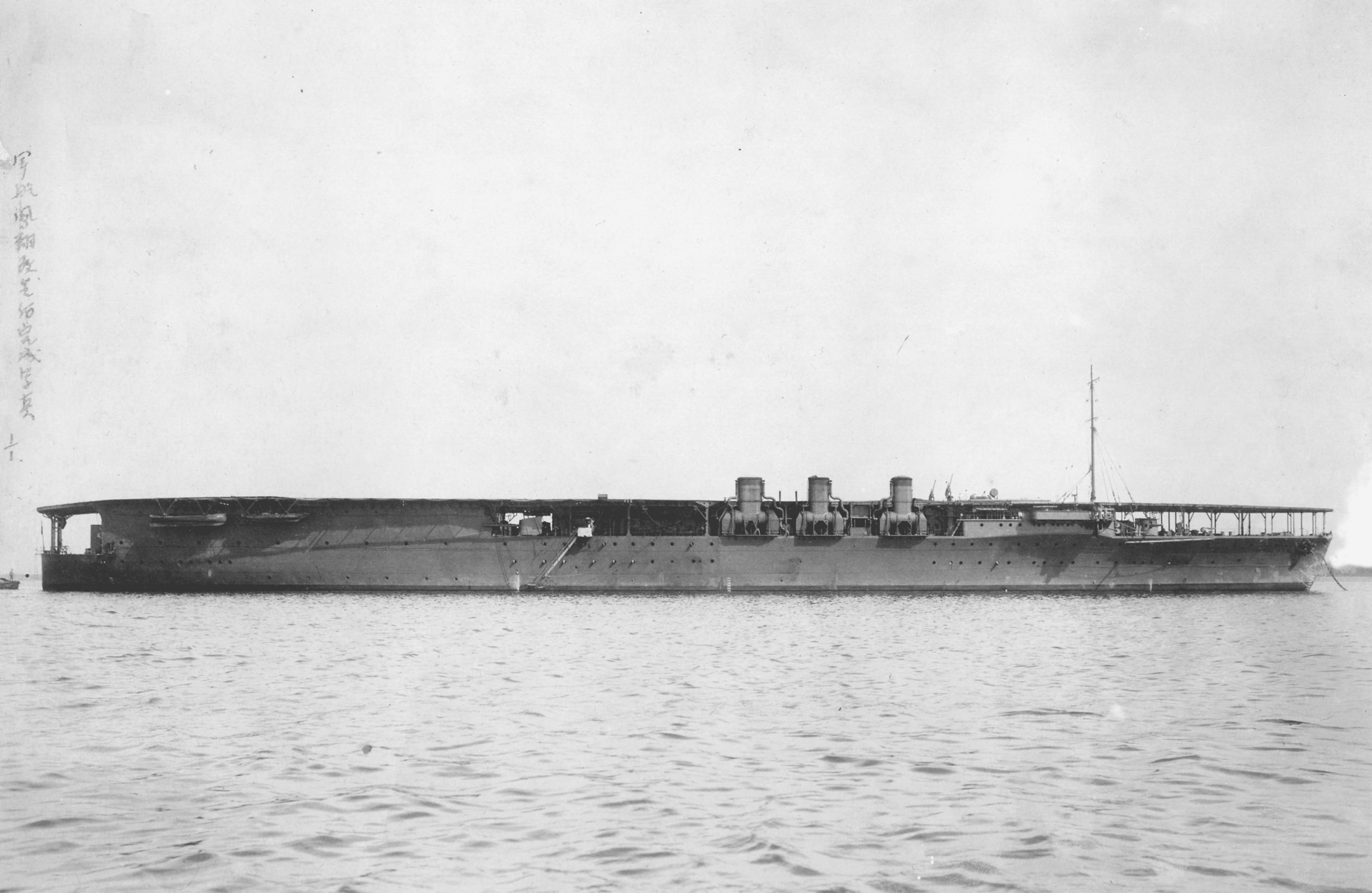
Hōshō in 1924 after her island was removed

Hōshō was laid down by the Asano Shipbuilding Company in Tsurumi-ku, Yokohama, on 16 December 1920. She was launched on 13 November 1921 and towed to Yokosuka Naval Arsenal for completion on 10 January 1922. Hōshō was delayed by repeated design changes and late deliveries of equipment, pushing the commissioning date from March to 27 December 1922. She was commissioned lacking much of her aviation equipment, and did not begin landing trials until 22 February 1923. The first landings were made by British pilots under contract, who were quickly replaced by Japanese pilots trained by the British Aviation Mission. After Hōshō was commissioned, experienced aircrews requested changes, and the ship was modified by the shipyard from 6 June to 20 August 1924. The island, tripod mast, and aircraft crane were removed since they partially obstructed the flight deck and obscured pilot visibility. The forward part of the flight deck was made horizontal, and the 8 cm AA guns were moved forward, close to the position of the former island and out of the way of landing operations. Another reason for removal of the island was that the IJN found that it was too small and cramped to be of effective use in controlling air operations or conning the ship. After the island was removed, the carrier's flight operations were controlled from a platform extending from the side of the flight deck, a design that would be repeated in subsequent Japanese aircraft carriers. The ship was then assigned to the 1st Fleet until 15 November 1924.

Hōshō was fitted with a net used as a barricade aft of the forward elevator between 10 March and 2 July 1925. It was intended to prevent landing aircraft from colliding with aircraft preparing to take off, and stop them from falling into the open elevator well. The barrier was hydraulically operated and could be erected in three seconds.

As the first of her kind, Hōshō provided valuable experience and insight into carrier air operations for the IJN. The ship was used for testing aircraft and equipment, particularly various types of arresting gear and optical landing aids. The lessons learned influenced the design and construction of Ryūjō and the subsequent conversions of battlecruiser Akagi and battleship Kaga into aircraft carriers. Hōshō was actively used to develop carrier operational methods and tactics for the IJN during the 1920s. She was assigned to the First Carrier Division with Akagi on 1 April 1928. During the 1930s Hōshō was fitted with three different types of transverse arresting gear for trials.

=== Shanghai ===
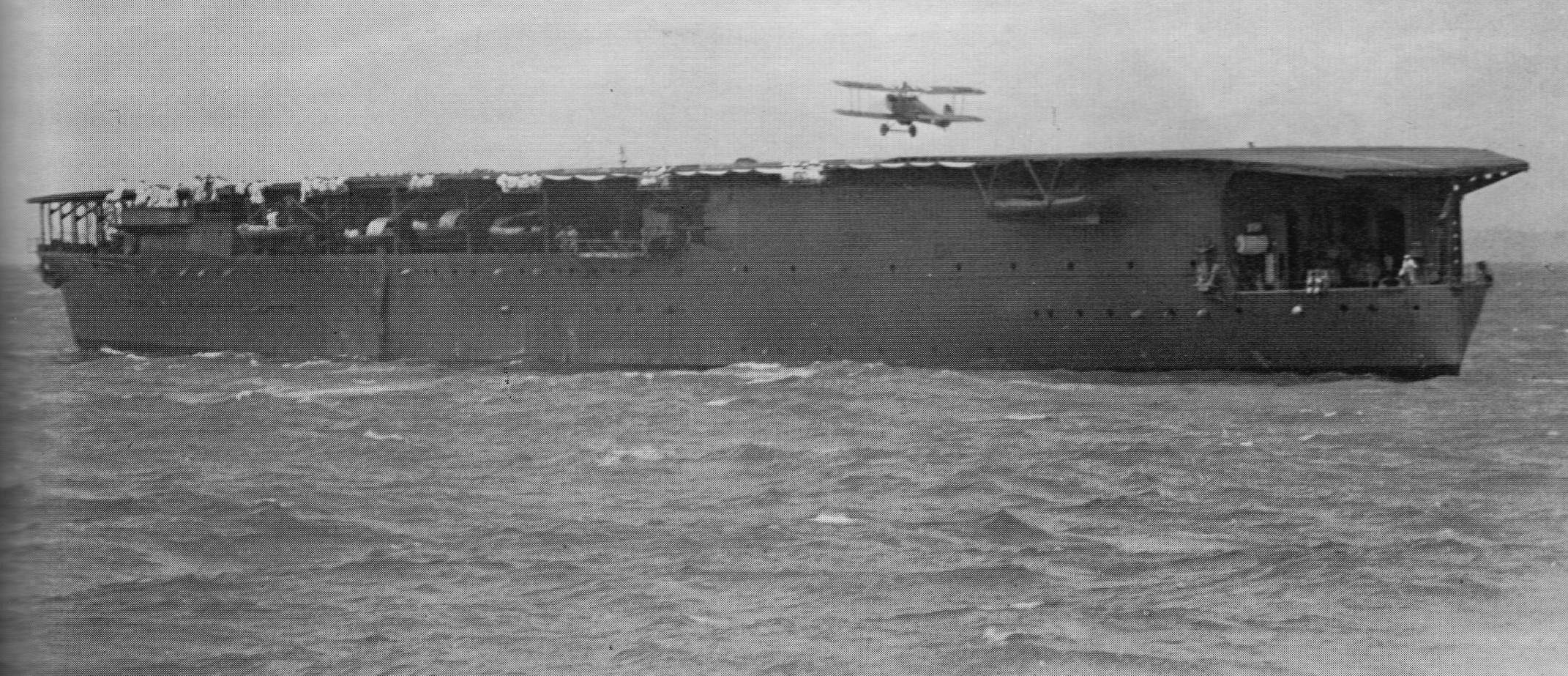
Hōshō conducts air operations around the time of the Shanghai Incident

Along with Kaga, Hōshō was assigned to the First Carrier Division and sent to China during the Shanghai Incident that began in January 1932. Operating with the Third Fleet, Hōshō arrived at the mouth of the Yangtze River on 1 February. Her aircraft participated in the IJN's first aerial combat on 5 February when three fighters, escorting two attack aircraft, were engaged by nine Chinese fighters over Shanghai; one Chinese fighter was damaged, although the Japanese pilots made no claim. Two days later, the two carriers sent some of their aircraft to Kunda Airfield where they flew ground attack missions in support of the Imperial Japanese Army. Between 23 and 26 February, Kaga and Hōshō bombers attacked Chinese airfields at Hangzhou and Suzhou, destroying a number of Chinese aircraft on the ground. On 26 February, six fighters from Hōshō, escorting nine attack aircraft from Kaga on one of the bombing raids, shot down three of five Chinese fighters that engaged them. The First Carrier Division rejoined the Combined Fleet on 20 March, after a ceasefire had been declared on 3 March.

=== Fourth Fleet incident ===
Hōshō participated in the Combined Fleet Maneuvers of 1935 during which she was attached to the IJN Fourth Fleet. Caught in a typhoon on 23 September, the carrier and a number of other Japanese ships were badly damaged in what was referred to as the "Fourth Fleet incident." The ship's forward flight deck collapsed and part had to be cut away before the carrier could proceed to Yokosuka for repairs. The Fourth Fleet incident and the Tomozuru Incident of 1934, in which a top-heavy torpedo boat capsized in heavy weather, caused the Japanese command to investigate the stability of all their ships, resulting in a number of design changes to improve stability and increase hull strength.

While the Hōshō was at the dockyard between 22 November 1935 and 31 March 1936, her stability was improved; the forward flight deck's supports were reinforced and increased in number; the ship's AA guns, aircraft crane and upper deck aviation fuel tanks were removed; the funnels were fixed in the horizontal position with their mouths angled slightly downwards; the front sides of Hōshō's forward hangar and bridge were reinforced; and the ship's hull was reinforced in the vicinity of her rear hangar to increase her longitudinal strength. At full load, her metacentric height after these changes was 1.11 meters (3 ft 8 in). Six twin 13.2 mm Type 93 Hotchkiss machine guns were also fitted.

=== Sino-Japanese War ===
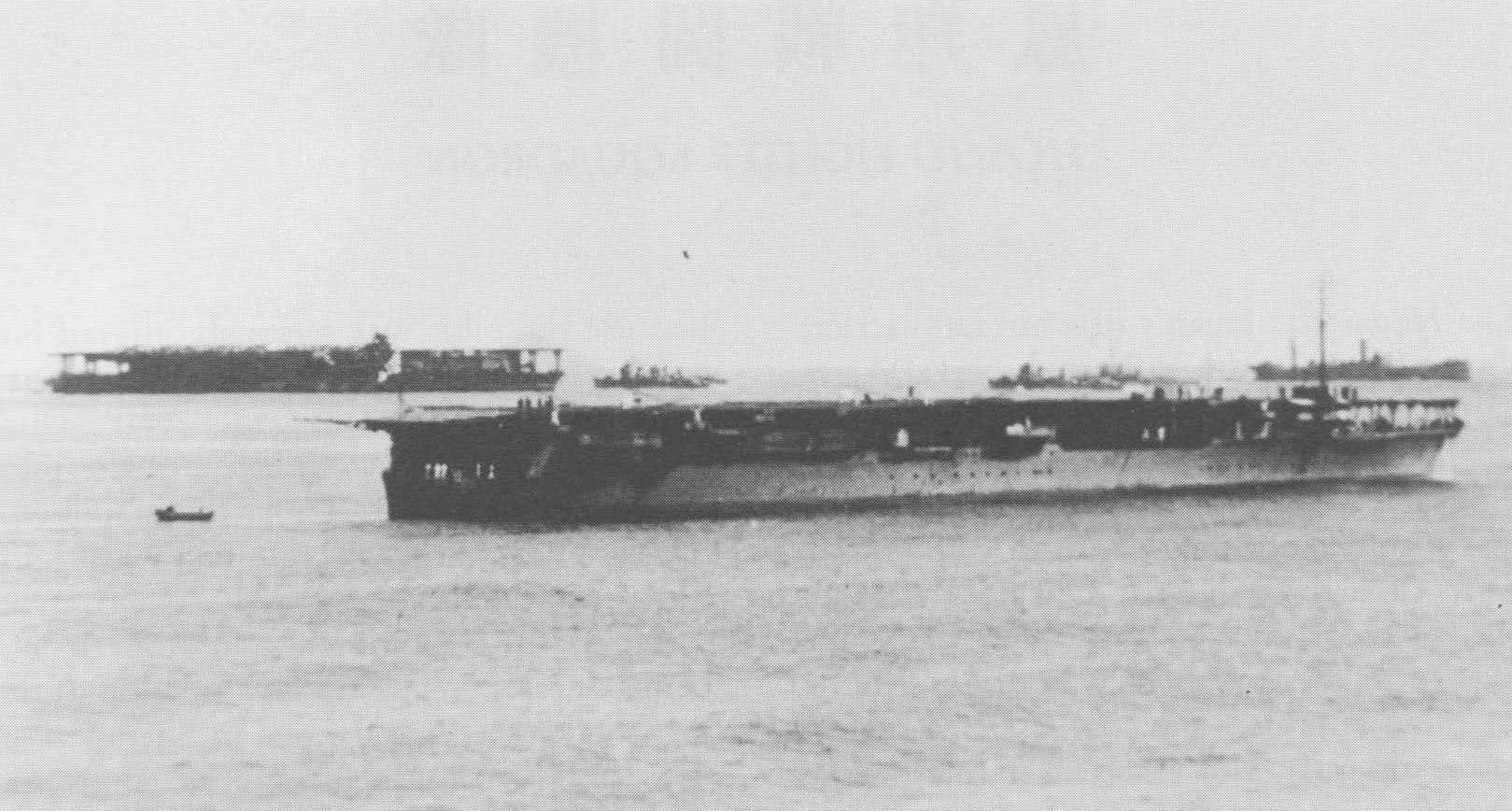
Hōshō (foreground) with Kaga (left background) around the time of the Sino-Japanese War

During the Sino-Japanese War, Hōshō rejoined the Third Fleet and supported land operations of the army in Central China in August 1937 with Ryūjō, later joined by Kaga. The three carriers carried a total of 90 aircraft to the conflict in China, including 15 from Hōshō, 27 on Ryūjō, and the rest with Kaga. Details of the activities of Hōshō's aircraft are scarce, but three of the ship's Nakajima A2N fighters shot down a Martin B-10 bomber on 25 July.

The carrier returned to Japan to refuel on 1 September and then sailed to the South China coast, accompanied by Ryūjō, and began operations against Chinese forces near Canton, now Guangzhou, on 21 September. That day, Hōshō contributed six fighters to escort bombers attacking airfields and the combined force encountered seven Curtiss Hawk III fighters, shooting down two, in addition to a pair of observation planes, for no combat losses of their own. Five of the Japanese fighters ran out of fuel during the return flight and had to ditch in the sea, although the aircrews were rescued. A followup air strike that afternoon was unsuccessfully attacked by the five remaining Hawks, at the cost of one of their own. The Japanese pilots claimed to have shot down sixteen enemy aircraft and an additional probable loss during the day's fighting. Hōshō and Ryūjō returned to the Shanghai area on 3 October and Hōshō's aircraft were temporarily transferred to Kunda airfield to support ground operations. On 17 October, the carrier transferred all of her aircraft to Ryūjō and returned to Japan where she was placed in reserve on 1 December.

During this time, her aircraft elevators were enlarged in 1939: the forward elevator to 12.8 by 8.5 meters (42 by 28 ft) and the rear elevator to 13.7 by 7 meters (45 by 23 ft). On 12 August 1939 Hōshō was deemed useful as a training carrier and, in critical battles, as a platform for A4N1 (Type 95) fighters and B4Y1 (Type 96) torpedo bombers, for as long as those planes remained serviceable. A later investigation determined on 23 December 1940 that she could not operate the latest aircraft types like the Mitsubishi A6M Zero, the Aichi D3A "Val", or the Nakajima B5N "Kate" in combat. Also, the small size of the carrier's airgroup limited the ship's potential value to the fleet in any future conflicts.

=== World War II ===
==== Pearl Harbor and Midway ====
Hōshō began the Pacific War in the Third Carrier Division assigned to the 1st Fleet under Vice Admiral Shirō Takasu. The carrier, captained by Kaoru Umetani, was tasked along with Zuihō to provide air support, including scouting, anti-submarine patrols, and combat air patrol for the Combined Fleet's "Main Body" battle-line of six battleships: Nagato, Mutsu, Fusō, Yamashiro, Ise, and Hyūga. With the Main Body, Hōshō sortied from the Inland Sea on 7 December 1941 to provide distant cover for the carrier forces under Chūichi Nagumo which were attacking Pearl Harbor. The battleship force turned back 300 nautical miles (556 km) east of Japan, but Hōshō became separated on 10 December due to radio silence restrictions while conducting anti-submarine air operations. The ship lost contact because she had launched aircraft near dusk to investigate a submarine sighting. The aircraft returned after dark and landed safely after the carrier turned on its lights. In order to recover the aircraft, however, the carrier and her three escorting destroyers had to steam east and therefore lost sight of the Main Body in the darkness. There does not appear to have been any enemy submarines in Japanese waters at this time. The carrier was located by scout aircraft the next day 500 nautical miles (926 km) east of the Main Body and returned to port at Kure on 12 December.

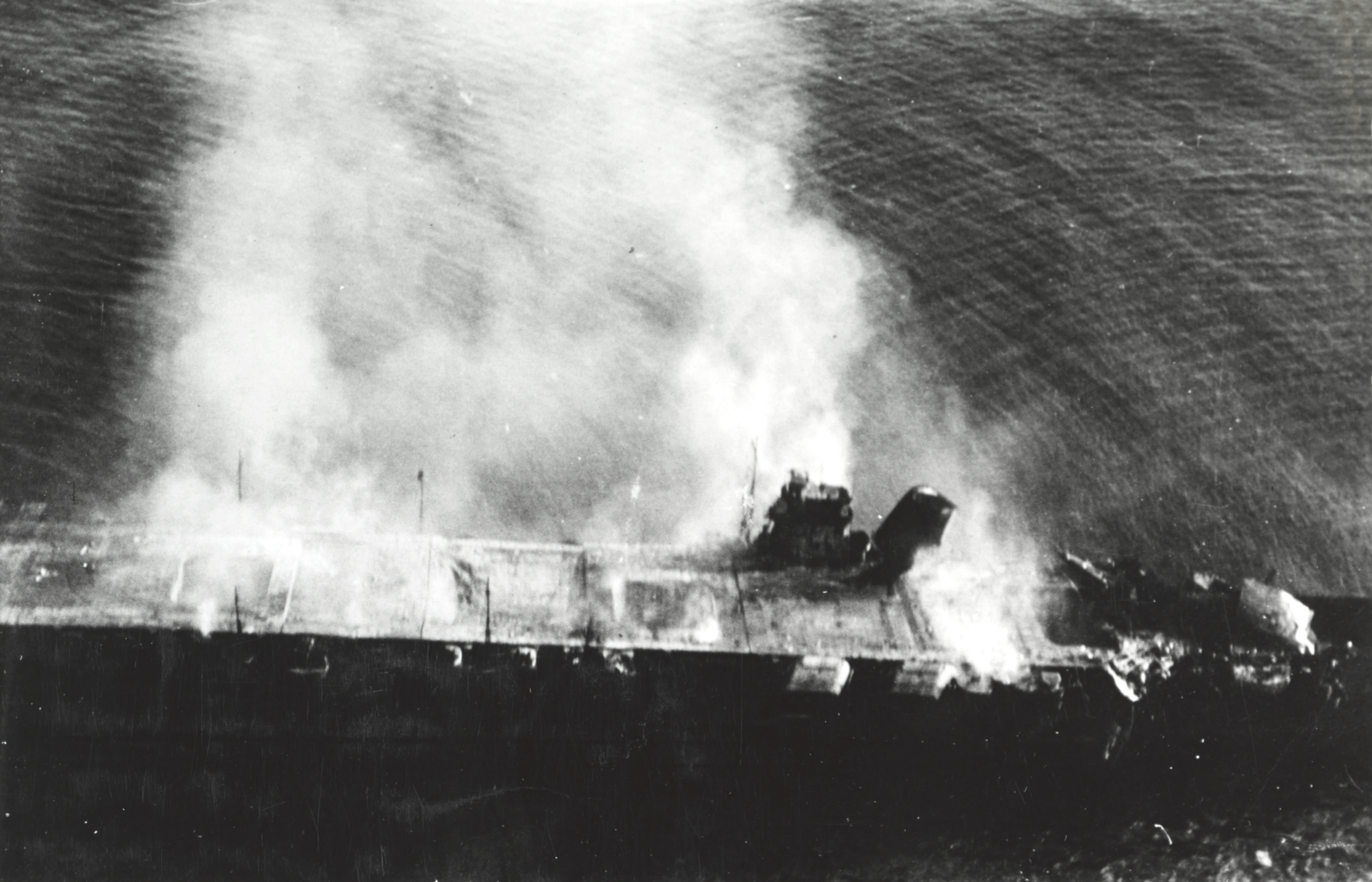
Hiryū on 5 June 1942 during the Battle of Midway, photographed from a Yokosuka B4Y biplane launched from Hōshō

On 29 May 1942, Hōshō sortied from Japan with the rest of the fleet for the operation which resulted in the Battle of Midway, providing modest air protection, scouting, and anti-submarine support for the Main Body, now consisting of the battleships Yamato, Nagato, and Mutsu. Her aircraft complement for the operation consisted of eight obsolete Yokosuka B4Y "Jean" torpedo bombers. (Note: Willmott states that Hōshō's airgroup at Midway also included nine Mitsubishi A5M ("Claude") Type 96 fighters. Matome Ugaki, in his diary, mentions only that Hōshō had six Type 96 bombers, but then states that Zuihō had nine fighters.)

With the Main Body trailing 300 nautical miles (556 km) behind the carrier striking force, Hōshō missed the major portion of the battle in which Nagumo's four fleet carriers were ambushed and fatally damaged by US carrier aircraft on 4 June. The next day, the carrier's aircraft helped guide the remnants of Nagumo's force to a rendezvous with the Main Body as well helped other Japanese warships to rendezvous during and after the battle, including the cruiser Sendai. Around the same time, one of Hōshō's aircraft discovered the burning, sinking Hiryū. Photographs of the abandoned carrier have been described as "among the most dramatic of the war in the Pacific". The observer aboard the aircraft also reported seeing survivors left behind on Hiryū so the destroyer Tanikaze was sent to unsuccessfully search for the wrecked carrier. With the battle lost, a significant strategic defeat for Japan, the carrier returned to Japan with the rest of the fleet, arriving at the Hashirajima anchorage on 14 June.

==== Training ship ====
After her return to Japan, Hōshō was transferred to the Third Fleet, unofficially assigned to the training fleet (later called the Mobile Force Training Force), and officially assigned in October. She conducted flight training in the Inland Sea for aircraft that flew in from shore bases, since no aircraft were based onboard Hōshō. On 15 January 1943, the 50th Air Flotilla was created for carrier aircrew training and both Hōshō and Ryūhō were assigned to the new unit. The two ships provided carrier landing training and served as target ships for torpedo training. In January 1944, Hōshō was reassigned to the 12th Air Fleet, then to the Combined Fleet, but continued to perform the same mission of training fleet carrier pilots in the Inland Sea. In this role, Hōshō shuttled back and forth between Kure and the Western Inland Sea, spending equal amounts of time at each location.

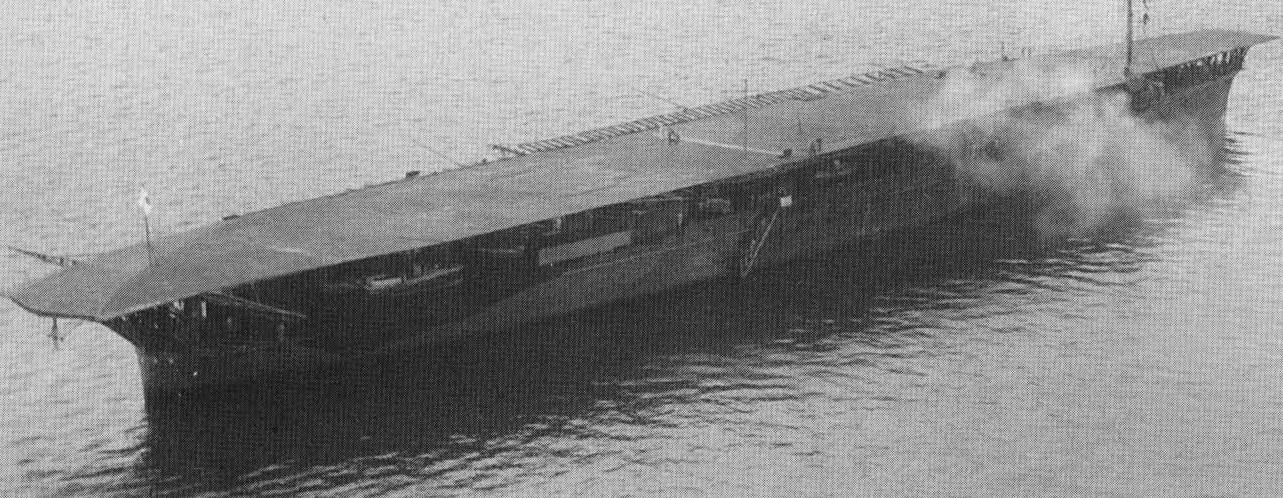
Hōshō with her extended and widened flight deck, photographed in October 1945

In order to service new and larger aircraft like the Nakajima B6N "Jill" torpedo bomber and the Yokosuka D4Y "Judy" dive bomber, the flight deck was extended over 6 meters (19 ft 8 in) at each end to a total length of 180.8 meters (593 ft 2 in) from 27 March to 26 April 1944. Hōshō also received new arresting gear and a new crash barrier. The additional weight high up in the ship adversely affected her stability and she was restricted from operations in bad weather lest she capsize. At some point during the war the ship's 14 cm guns were removed and she received about twenty 25-millimeter Type 96 autocannons in single mounts. They fired .25-kilogram (0.55 lb) projectiles at a muzzle velocity of 900 m/s (3,000 ft/s); at 50°, this provided a maximum range of 7,500 meters (8,202 yd), and an effective ceiling of 5,500 meters (18,000 ft). The 15-round magazines needed to be changed frequently, and the maximum effective rate of fire was only between 110 and 120 rounds per minute.

After the modifications, Hōshō continued to provide training to navy pilots in the Inland Sea, including acting as a target ship for torpedo training. At 05:30 on 19 March 1945, possibly while berthed at Kure, the carrier was caught in an air raid by carrier aircraft from the United States Task Force 58. Hōshō's flight deck was damaged by three bomb hits which killed six crewmen. Emergency repairs were made and her captain was ordered to keep her in readiness on 10 April. However, this order was revoked two days later and the carrier became a "4th reserve ship" with most of her crew transferred elsewhere. Hōshō was taken out of reserve as a "special guard ship" on 1 June and many of her crew were transferred back. During this time, the ship remained moored and camouflaged off Nishinomishima at Kure. (Note: Tully states that records, both Japanese and Allied, are unclear on the carrier's location during the 19 March airstrikes. The ship may not have been at Kure at the time, instead in the Seto Inland Sea conducting training or possibly in Hiroshima Bay.)

Hōshō was slightly damaged by a single bomb or aerial rocket hit when the Allies attacked Kure again on 24 July 1945. Information is scarce on the extent of the ship's involvement in the action, but it appears the carrier's participation was minimal, as she embarked no aircraft at the time. Hōshō was repaired within 15 days, although the ship relocated to Moji two days later.

== Post-war ==
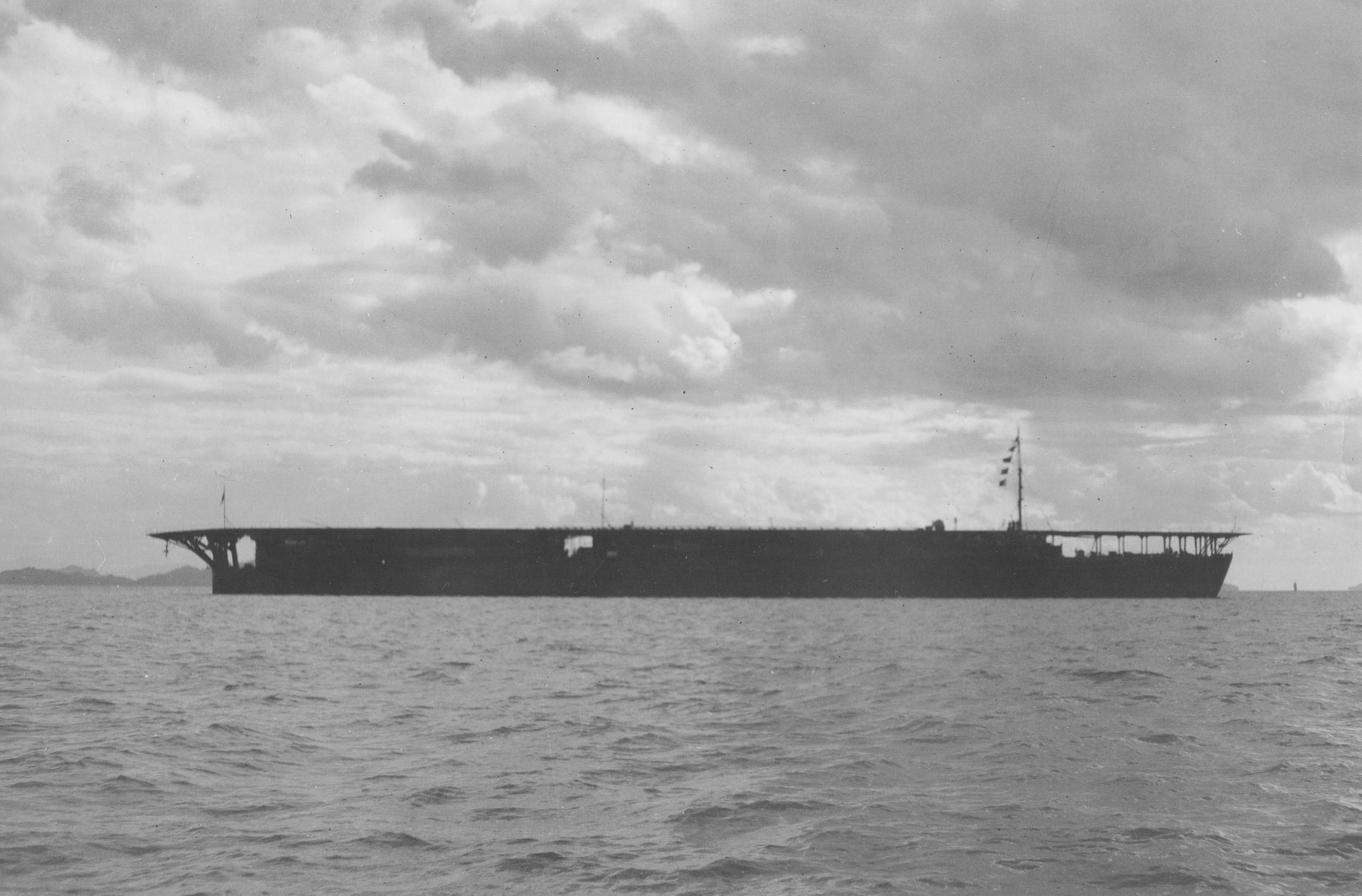
Hōshō at Kure, Japan, in October 1945 shortly before departing on a repatriation mission

The ship was turned over to Allied forces at the time of the surrender of Japan on 2 September and was stricken from the navy list on 5 October. Hōshō then served as a repatriation transport to retrieve Japanese servicemen and civilians stationed overseas and return them to Japan. In October and November 1945, accompanied by the cruiser Kashima, she carried 700 passengers from Wotje Atoll, 311 from Jaluit Atoll, and an undocumented number from Enewetak Atoll to Uraga, Kanagawa.

In December 1945, Hōshō's overhanging flight deck at the bow was cut off to improve visibility from the bridge and her hangars were modified to carry more passengers. Thereafter, she undertook more repatriation missions beginning with one to Wewak on 5 January 1946 and subsequent trips to China. In total, the carrier made nine repatriation trips before 15 August 1946 and transported about 40,000 passengers. Hōshō was transferred to the Home Ministry on 31 August for disposal. She was scrapped in Osaka from 2 September 1946 to 1 May 1947 by the Kyōwa Shipbuilding Company.
