= Oy =

Oy or OY may refer to:

== Arts and entertainment ==
- Oy, an animal character in Stephen King's Dark Tower series
- Oy (album), a studio album of Iranian singer-songwriter Mohsen Namjoo
- Oy! (film), a 2009 Indian Telugu-language film starring Siddharth Narayan and Shamili

== Business ==
- Osakeyhtiö, often abbreviated Oy, a type of Finnish limited company

== Places ==
- Oy, a village in the Oy-Mittelberg municipality, Bavaria, Germany
- Oy, Russia, a rural locality (selo) in Khangalassky District of the Sakha Republic, Russia
- County Offaly, Ireland (code OY)

== People ==
- Edin Øy (born 1997), Norwegian footballer
- Nils E. Øy (born 1946), Norwegian newspaper editor
- Jenna von Oÿ (born 1977), American actress and country music singer

== Transportation ==
- Conair of Scandinavia, former Danish airline (flight code prefix OY-)
- Omni Air International IATA airline designator
- "OY" (Oscar Yankee), an aircraft registration code prefix for airplanes from Denmark
- Bedford OY, a British army lorry introduced in 1939

== Language ==
- Oy or Oi language, spoken in Laos
- Oy, a Yiddish exclamation of chagrin, dismay, exasperation or pain, commonly used in the phrase oy vey
- oy, a digraph found in many languages
- Oi (interjection), sometimes spelled "oy", a British slang interjection used to get someone's attention
- Uk (Cyrillic) (Оу оу), an old Cyrillic homoglyph of Oy

== Titles ==
- Order of Yukon (post-nominal letters)

== See also ==
- Oi (disambiguation)
