= 14 cm/50 3rd Year Type naval gun =

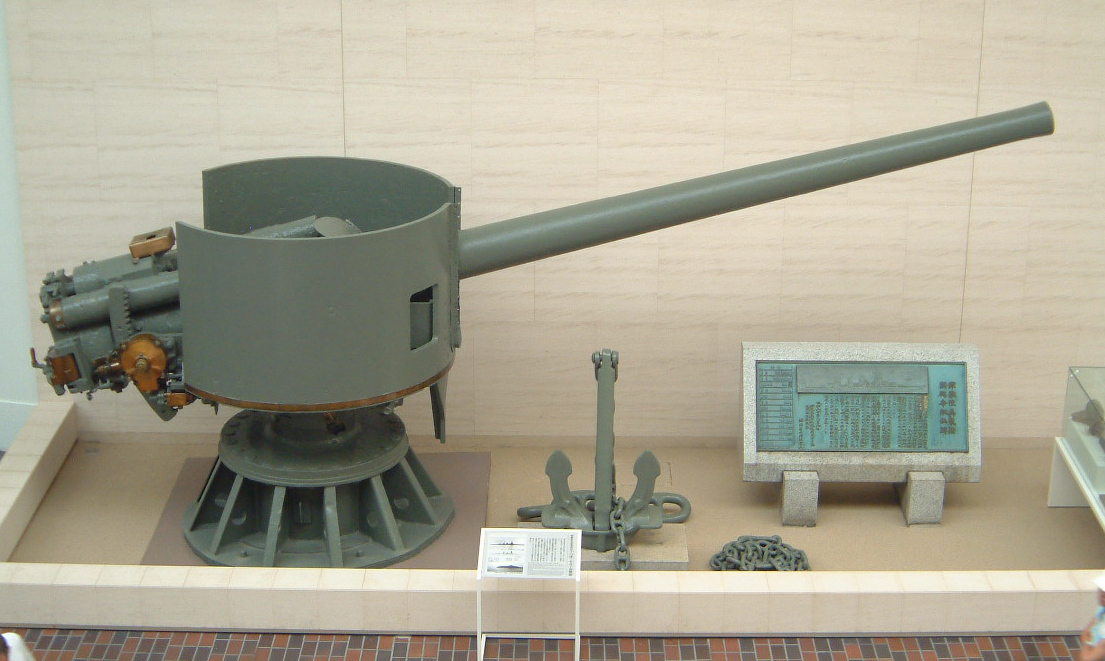
- 14 cm/50 3rd Year Type naval gun from the battleship Mutsu
- Type: Naval gun Coast-defense gun
- Place of origin: Japan

Service history
- In service: 1914–1945
- Used by: Imperial Japanese Navy
- Wars: World War I; World War II

Specifications
- Mass: 5,600–5,700 kilograms (12,346–12,566 lb)
- Barrel length: 7.0 meters (23 ft 0 in) (bore length)
- Shell: separate-loading, bagged charge
- Shell weight: 38 kilograms (84 lb)
- Caliber: 14 centimeters (5.5 in)
- Breech: Welin breech block
- Elevation: -7° to +35° depending on mount
- Rate of fire: About 6 rounds per minute
- Muzzle velocity: 850–855 meters per second (2,790–2,810 ft/s)
- Maximum firing range: 19,750 meters (21,600 yd) at +35°

The 14 cm/50 3rd Year Type naval gun was a Japanese low-angle weapon introduced during World War I.

== History ==
It served as the secondary armament in a number of Japanese dreadnoughts and as the main armament in light cruisers and some auxiliary ships. It was also the most common Japanese coast-defense gun during World War II. "Third year type" refers to the Welin breech block on this gun. Breech-block design began in 1914, the third year of the Taishō period. This breech-block design was also used on Japanese 41 cm (16 in), 20.3 cm (8.0 in), 15.5 cm (6.1 in), 12.7 cm (5.0 in), and 12 cm (4.7 in) naval guns.

This gun was not mounted aboard submarines. Submarine cruisers used the shorter-barreled 14 cm/40 11th Year Type naval gun.

== Naval Use ==
- single casemate mounts
  - 20x1 Ise-class battleship (removed during conversion to hybrid carrier)
  - 20x1 Nagato-class battleship
- single pedestal mounts
  - 7x1 Sendai-class cruiser
  - 7x1 Nagara-class cruiser
  - 7x1 Kuma-class cruiser
  - 4x1 Tenryū-class cruiser
  - 2x1 light cruiser Yūbari (also had twin mounts)
  - 4x1 aircraft carrier Hōshō
- twin mounts
  - 3x2 seaplane carrier Nisshin
  - 2x2 Jingei-class submarine tender
  - 2x2 Katori-class cruiser
  - 2x2 minelayer Okinoshima
  - 2x2 light cruiser Yūbari (also had single mounts)
- (uncertain mount)
  - Akagi Maru-class armed merchantmen
  - Kongō Maru-class armed merchantmen
  - Ning Hai-class cruiser

== See also ==
=== Weapons of comparable role, performance and era ===
- BL 5.5 inch Mark I naval gun : British equivalent
- Canon de 138 mm Modèle 1910 Naval gun : French equivalent

== Gallery ==
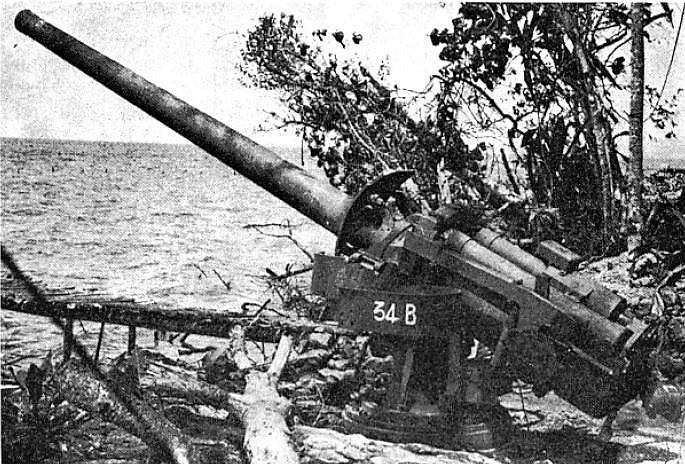
A 3rd Year Type gun used for coastal defense.

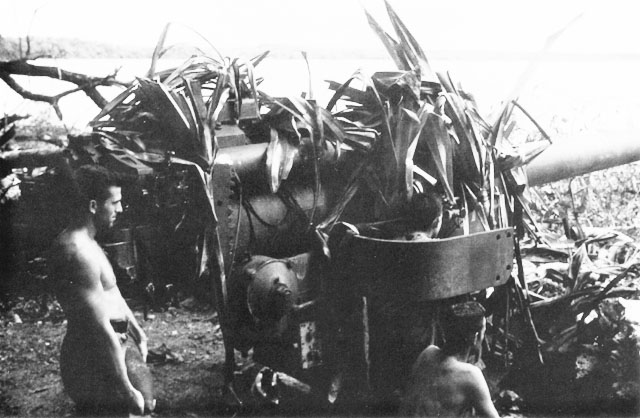
A captured gun after the Battle of Enogai.

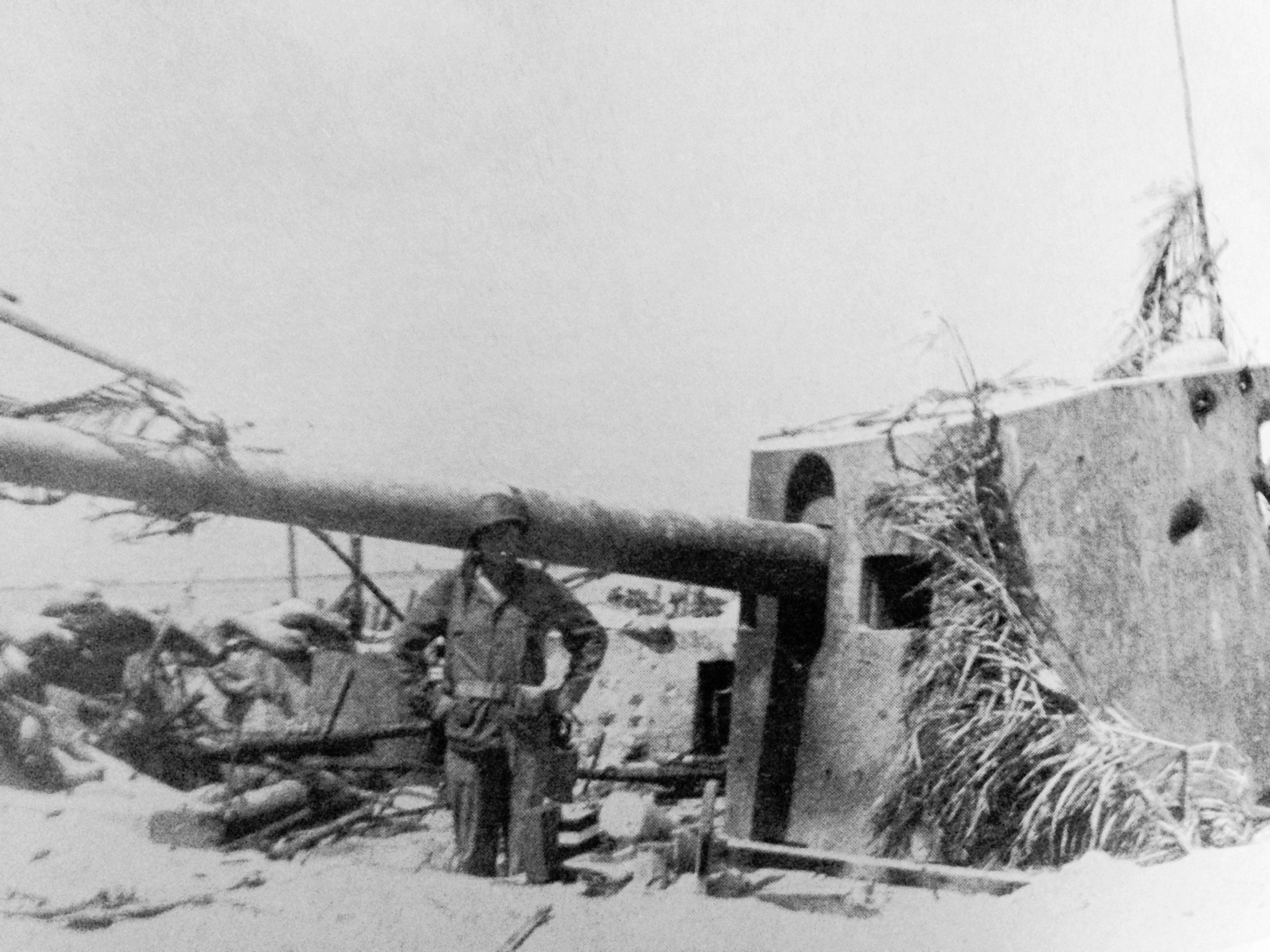
A turret mounted gun captured on Tarawa.

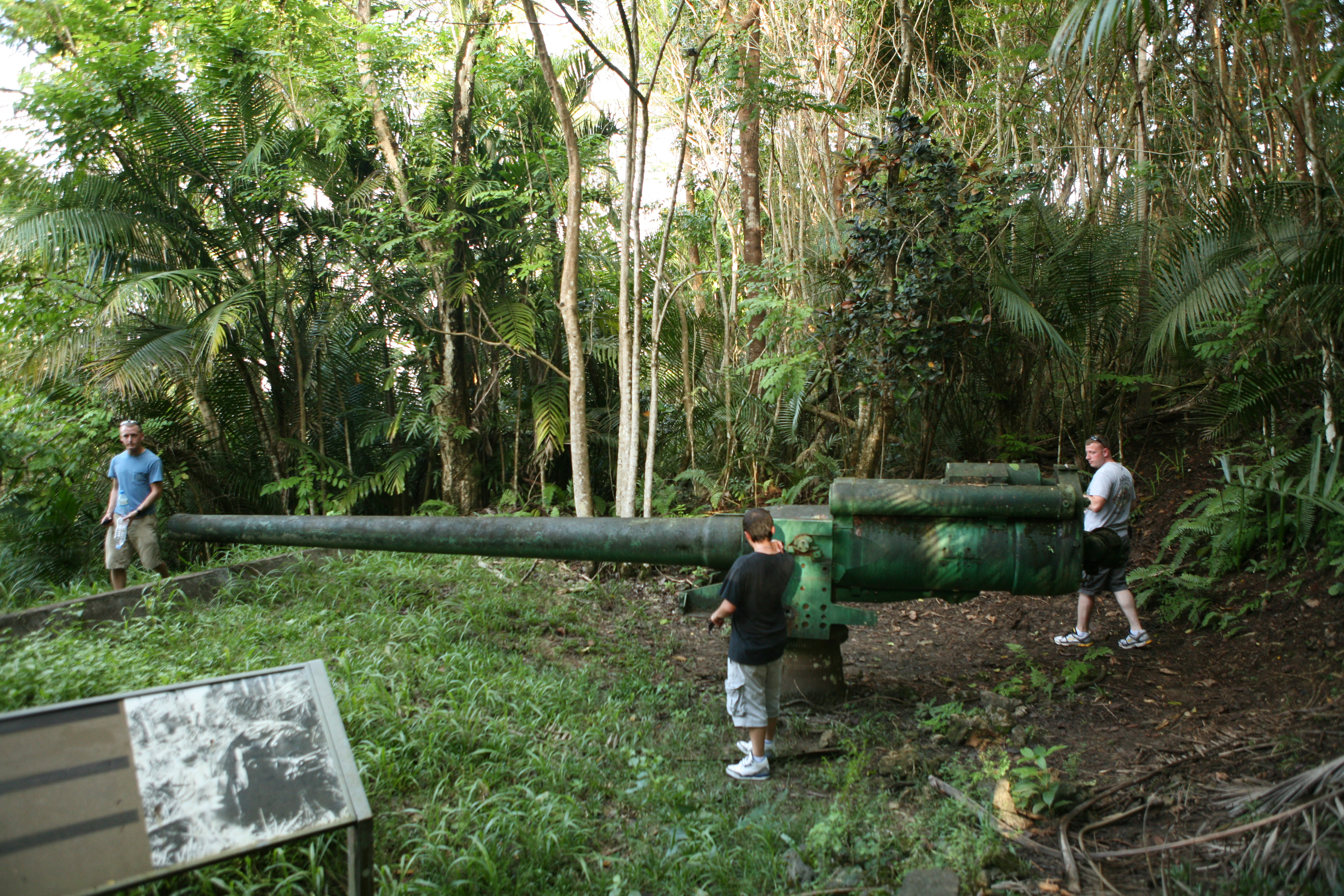
One of the three surviving Piti Guns on Guam.
