= List of cruiser classes of the Imperial Japanese Navy =

This is a list of cruisers of the Imperial Japanese Navy built between 1885 and 1945.

== Armoured cruisers (Sōkō jun'yōkan) ==
Ship	Builder	Class and type	Displacement (tons)	Commissioned into IJN	Fate
Asama	Armstrong Whitworth, UK	Asama-class armoured cruiser	9,700	18 March 1899	30 November 1945; Scrapped
Tokiwa	Armstrong Whitworth, UK	Asama-class armoured cruiser	9,700	18 May 1899	9 August 1945; destroyed by USN aircraft at Ominato
Yakumo	Stettiner Vulcan AG, Germany	Armoured cruiser	9,646	20 June 1900	20 July 1946; scrapped
Azuma	Saint-Nazaire shipyards, France	Armoured cruiser	9,307	28 July 1900	15 February 1944; Scrapped
Izumo	Armstrong Whitworth, UK	Izumo-class armoured cruiser	9,750	25 September 1900	24 July 1945; destroyed at mooring by USN aircraft at Kure
Iwate	Armstrong Whitworth, UK	Izumo-class armoured cruiser	9,750	18 March 1901	26 July 1945; destroyed at mooring by USN aircraft at Kure
Kasuga	Gio. Ansaldo & C., Italy	Kasuga-class armoured cruiser	7,680	4 January 1904	18 July 1945; destroyed at mooring by USN aircraft at Yokosuka
Nisshin	Gio. Ansaldo & C., Italy	Kasuga-class armoured cruiser	7,689	7 January 1904	18 January 1942; scuttled 1936
Tsukuba	Kure Naval Arsenal, Japan	Tsukuba-class armoured cruiser	13,750	14 January 1907	14 January 1917; Accidental explosion
Ikoma	Kure Naval Arsenal, Japan	Tsukuba-class armoured cruiser	13,750	28 March 1908	20 September 1923; Scrapped
Ibuki	Kure Naval Arsenal, Japan	Ibuki-class armoured cruiser	14,636	1 November 1909	20 September 1923; Scrapped
Aso	La Seyne-sur-Mer, France	Bayan-class armoured cruiser	7,726	30 November 1908	1 April 1931; Retired; subsequently expended as target off Izu Oshima
Kurama	Yokosuka Naval Arsenal, Japan	Ibuki-class armoured cruiser	14,636	28 February 1911	20 September 1923; Scrapped

Note that the four Tsukuba and Ibuki class armoured cruisers were re-classed as "battlecruisers" by the Imperial Japanese Navy in 1912.

== Battlecruisers (jun'yōsenkan) ==
Ship	Builder	Class and type	Displacement (tons)	Commissioned into IJN	Fate
Kongō	Vickers Shipbuilding, Barrow-in-Furness	Kongō-class battlecruiser	26,230	16 August 1913	21 November 1944; sunk by USS Sealion in the Formosa Strait
Hiei	Yokosuka Naval Arsenal, Japan	Kongō-class battlecruiser	26,230	4 August 1914	13 November 1942; sunk by USN ships and aircraft in the Naval Battle of Guadalcanal
Haruna	Kawasaki, Kobe	Kongō-class battlecruiser	26,230	19 April 1915	28 July 1945; sunk by USN aircraft at Kure
Kirishima	Mitsubishi, Nagasaki	Kongō-class battlecruiser	26,230	19 April 1915	15 November 1942; sunk by USS Washington in the Naval Battle of Guadalcanal

== Heavy cruisers (jū jun'yōkan) ==
Ship	Builder	Class and type	Displacement (tons)	Commissioned into IJN	Fate
Furutaka	Mitsubishi, Nagasaki	Furutaka-class heavy cruiser	9,150	31 March 1926	12 October 1942; Sunk by USN cruisers, Battle of Cape Esperance
Kako	Kawasaki, Kobe	Furutaka-class heavy cruiser	9,150	30 July 1926	10 August 1942; Sunk by USS S-44 off New Ireland (island)
Aoba	Mitsubishi, Nagasaki	Aoba-class heavy cruiser	10,822	20 September 1927	28 July 1945; Sunk by USN aircraft, Kure, raised and scrapped post war.
Kinugasa	Kawasaki, Kobe	Aoba-class heavy cruiser	10,822	30 September 1927	14 November 1942; Sunk by USN aircraft at Naval Battle of Guadalcanal
Myōkō	Yokosuka Naval Arsenal, Japan	Myōkō-class heavy cruiser	13,300	31 July 1929	8 June 1946; Scuttled in the Strait of Malacca after surrender to the Royal Navy
Nachi	Kure Naval Arsenal, Japan	Myōkō-class heavy cruiser	13,300	28 November 1928	5 November 1944; Sunk by USN aircraft at Manila Bay
Ashigara	Kawasaki, Kobe	Myōkō-class heavy cruiser	13,300	8 February 1929	8 June 1945; Sunk by HMS Trenchant in Bangka Strait
Haguro	Mitsubishi, Nagasaki	Myōkō-class heavy cruiser	13,300	25 April 1929	16 May 1945; Sunk by Royal Navy at Battle of the Malacca Strait
Takao	Yokosuka Naval Arsenal, Japan	Takao-class heavy cruiser	15,490	31 May 1932	29 October 1946; Sunk as a target ship in the Strait of Malacca after surrender to the Royal Navy
Atago	Kure Naval Arsenal, Japan	Takao-class heavy cruiser	15,490	30 March 1932	23 October 1944; Sunk by USS Darter at in Palawan Passage during the Battle of Leyte Gulf
Chōkai	Mitsubishi, Nagasaki	Takao-class heavy cruiser	15,490	30 June 1932	25 October 1944; Sunk by USN during Battle off Samar
Maya	Kawasaki, Kobe	Takao-class heavy cruiser	15,490	30 June 1932	23 October 1944; Sunk by USS Dace at in the Palawan Passage during the Battle of Leyte Gulf
Mogami	Kure Naval Arsenal, Japan	Mogami-class heavy cruiser	13,440	28 July 1935	25 October 1944; Scuttled after Battle of the Surigao Strait
Mikuma	Mitsubishi, Nagasaki	Mogami-class heavy cruiser	13,440	29 August 1935	6 June 1942; Sunk by USN aircraft, Battle of Midway
Suzuya	Yokosuka Naval Arsenal, Japan	Mogami-class heavy cruiser	13,440	31 October 1937	25 October 1944; Scuttled after Battle off Samar
Kumano	Kawasaki, Kobe	Mogami-class heavy cruiser	13,440	31 October 1937	25 November 1944; Sunk by USN aircraft at Santa Cruz, Philippines
Tone	Mitsubishi, Nagasaki	Tone-class heavy cruiser	15,200	20 November 1938	24 July 1945; Sunk at Etajima, Hiroshima, raised and scrapped post war.
Chikuma	Mitsubishi, Nagasaki	Tone-class heavy cruiser	15,200	20 May 1939	25 October 1944; Sunk at Battle off Samar

== Protected cruisers (Bōgo jun'yōkan) & unprotected cruisers (Mubōbina jun'yōkan) ==
Ship	Builder	Class and type	Displacement (tons)	Commissioned into IJN	Fate
Tsukushi	Armstrong Whitworth, United Kingdom	Tsukushi-class unprotected cruiser	1,350	18 June 1883	26 May 1906; Decommissioned; Scrapped in 1911
Naniwa	Armstrong Whitworth, United Kingdom	Naniwa-class protected cruiser	3,650	1 December 1885	12 August 1912; Grounded off Urup, Kurile Islands
Takachiho	Armstrong Whitworth, United Kingdom	Naniwa-class protected cruiser	3,650	1 December 1885	17 October 1914; Torpedoed during the Battle of Tsingtao
Unebi	Forges et Chantiers de la Gironde, France	Protected cruiser	3,615	18 October 1886	December 1886; Vanished in South China Sea
Takao	Yokosuka Naval Arsenal	Unprotected cruiser	1,750	16 November 1889	1 April 1911; Decommissioned; Scrapped in 1912
Yaeyama	Yokosuka Naval Arsenal	Unprotected cruiser	1,584	15 March 1890	1 April 1911; Decommissioned; Scrapped in 1912
Chiyoda	John Brown & Company, United Kingdom	Protected cruiser	3,615	1 January 1891	28 February 1927; Decommissioned; Expended as target on 5 August 1927
Chishima	Ateliers et Chantiers de la Loire, France	Unprotected cruiser	741	27 November 1892	30 November 1892; Sunk after collision with SS Ravenna, Seto Inland Sea
Matsushima	Société Nouvelle des Forges et Chantiers de la Méditerranée, France	Matsushima-class protected cruiser	4,217	5 April 1892	30 April 1908; Sunk after accidental explosion, Makung, Pescadores Islands
Itsukushima	Société Nouvelle des Forges et Chantiers de la Méditerranée, France	Matsushima-class protected cruiser	4,278	3 September 1891	12 March 1926; Decommissioned and scrapped
Hashidate	Yokosuka Naval Arsenal	Matsushima-class protected cruiser	4,287	26 June 1894	1 April 1922; Decommissioned; Scrapped in 1927
Yoshino	Armstrong Whitworth, United Kingdom	Protected cruiser	4,150	30 September 1893	15 May 1904; Sunk after collision with Kasuga, Yellow Sea
Akitsushima	Yokosuka Naval Arsenal	Protected cruiser	3,100	31 March 1894	10 January 1927; Decommissioned and scrapped
Tatsuta	Armstrong Whitworth, United Kingdom	Unprotected cruiser	650	31 July 1894	26 March 1926; Decommissioned and scrapped
Izumi	Armstrong Whitworth, United Kingdom	Protected cruiser	2,920	8 January 1895	1 April 1912; Decommissioned; Scrapped in 1913
Saien	Stettiner Vulcan AG Germany	Protected cruiser	2,440	16 March 1895 (as prize of war)	30 November 1904; Mined off Port Arthur
Suma	Yokosuka Naval Arsenal	Suma-class protected cruiser	2,657	12 December 1896	4 April 1923; Decommissioned; Scrapped in 1928
Akashi	Yokosuka Naval Arsenal	Suma-class protected cruiser	2,657	30 March 1899	1 April 1928; Decommissioned; Expended as target in 1930
Chitose	Union Iron Works, United States	Kasagi-class protected cruiser	4,900	1 March 1898	1 April 1928; Decommissioned; Expended as target off Shikoku in 1931
Kasagi	William Cramp & Sons, United States	Kasagi-class protected cruiser	4,900	24 October 1898	8 October 1916; Grounded off Tsugaru Strait
Takasago	Armstrong Whitworth, United Kingdom	Protected cruiser	4,160	17 May 1898	13 December 1904; Mined off Port Arthur
Miyako	Kure Naval Arsenal	Unprotected cruiser	1,772	31 March 1899	14 May 1904; Mined off Port Arthur
Chihaya	Yokosuka Naval Arsenal	Unprotected cruiser	1,238	9 September 1901	1 September 1929; Decommissioned; Scrapped in 1939
Niitaka	Yokosuka Naval Arsenal	Niitaka-class protected cruiser	3,366	27 January 1904	26 August 1923; Sunk by typhoon off Kamchatka Peninsula
Tsushima	Kure Naval Arsenal	Niitaka-class protected cruiser	3,366	14 February 1904	1 April 1940; Decommissioned; Expended as target off Miura in 1944
Otowa	Yokosuka Naval Arsenal	Protected cruiser	3,000	6 September 1904	10 August 1917; Grounded off Mie Prefecture
Suzuya	Schichau shipyards, Danzig, Germany	Protected cruiser	3,080	20 August 1906 (as prize of war)	1 April 1913; Decommissioned and scrapped
Soya	William Cramp & Sons, United States	Protected cruiser	6,500	9 July 1907 (as prize of war)	5 April 1916; Sold back to Russia
Tsugaru	Admiralty Shipyard, Russia	Protected cruiser	6,932	22 August 1908 (as prize of war)	1 April 1922; Decommissioned; Scuttled off Yokosuka on 27 May 1924
Yodo	Kawasaki Yards, Kobe	Yodo-class protected cruiser	1,250	8 April 1908	1 April 1940; Decommissioned; Scrapped in 1945
Mogami	Mitsubishi Yards, Nagasaki	Yodo-class protected cruiser	1,350	16 September 1908	1 April 1928; Decommissioned; Scrapped in 1929
Tone	Sasebo Naval Arsenal	Protected cruiser	4,900	5 May 1910	1 April 1931; Decommissioned; Expended as target in 1933
Chikuma	Sasebo Naval Arsenal	Chikuma-class protected cruiser	5,040	17 May 1912	1 April 1931; Decommissioned; Expended as target in 1935
Hirado	Kawasaki Yards, Kobe	Chikuma-class protected cruiser	5,040	17 June 1912	1 April 1940; Decommissioned; Scrapped in 1947
Yahagi	Mitsubishi Yards, Nagasaki	Chikuma-class protected cruiser	5,040	27 June 1912	1 April 1940; Decommissioned; Scrapped in 1947

== Light cruisers (Kei jun'yōkan) ==
Ship	Builder	Class and type	Displacement (tons)	Commissioned into IJN	Fate
Tatsuta	Sasebo Navy Yard	Tenryū-class light cruiser	3,948	31 May 1919	13 March 1944; Sunk by USS Sand Lance east of Hachijojima
Tenryū	Yokosuka Naval Arsenal	Tenryū-class light cruiser	3,948	20 November 1919	18 December 1942; Sunk by USS Albacore E of Madang
Kuma	Sasebo Navy Yard	Kuma-class light cruiser	5,100	31 August 1920	10 March 1944; Sunk by HMS Tally-Ho west of Penang
Tama	Sasebo Navy Yard	Kuma-class light cruiser	5,100	29 January 1921	25 October 1944; Sunk by USS Jallao northeast of Luzon
Kiso	Mitsubishi, Nagasaki	Kuma-class light cruiser	5,100	29 January 1921	20 March 1944; Sunk by USN aircraft west of Cavite
Kitakami	Sasebo Navy Yard	Kuma-class light cruiser	5,100	15 April 1921	30 November 1945; scrapped 10 August 1946 – 31 March 1947
Ōi	Kawasaki, Kobe	Kuma-class light cruiser	5,100	10 October 1921	19 July 1944; Sunk by USS Flasher south of Hong Kong
Nagara	Sasebo Navy Yard	Nagara-class light cruiser	5,832	21 April 1922	7 August 1944; Sunk by USS Croaker off Amakusa
Natori	Mitsubishi, Nagasaki	Nagara-class light cruiser	5,832	15 September 1922	18 August 1944; Sunk by USS Hardhead east of Samar
Kinu	Kawasaki, Kobe	Nagara-class light cruiser	5,832	10 November 1922	26 October 1944; Sunk by USN aircraft in Sibuyan Sea
Yura	Sasebo Navy Yard	Nagara-class light cruiser	5,832	20 March 1923	25 October 1942; Scuttled off Savo Island after bombing by USAAF
Isuzu	Uraga Dock Company	Nagara-class light cruiser	5,832	15 August 1923	7 April 1945; Sunk by USN submarines off Sumbawa
Abukuma	Uraga Dock Company	Nagara-class light cruiser	5,832	26 May 1925	26 October 1944; Sunk by USAAF aircraft off Negros Island
Sendai	Mitsubishi, Nagasaki	Sendai-class light cruiser	5,195	29 April 1924	3 November 1943; Sunk by USN cruisers at Empress Augusta Bay
Jintsu	Kawasaki, Kobe	Sendai-class light cruiser	5,195	31 July 1925	13 July 1943; Sunk by USN cruisers off Kolombangara
Naka	Sasebo Navy Yard	Sendai-class light cruiser	5,195	30 November 1925	18 February 1944; Sunk by USN aircraft off Truk
Yūbari	Sasebo Navy Yard	Yūbari-class light cruiser	2,840	23 July 1923	28 April 1944; Sunk by USS Bluegill off Palau
Katori	Mitsubishi, Yokohama	Katori-class training cruiser	5,890	20 April 1940	18 February 1944; Sunk by USS Iowa off Truk
Kashima	Mitsubishi, Yokohama	Katori-class training cruiser	5,890	31 May 1940	5 October 1945; Scrapped
Kashii	Mitsubishi, Yokohama	Katori-class training cruiser	5,890	15 July 1941	20 March 1945; Sunk by USN aircraft, South China Sea
Agano	Sasebo Navy Yard	Agano-class light cruiser	6,650	31 October 1942	15 February 1944; Sunk by USS Skate north of Truk
Noshiro	Mitsubishi, Nagasaki	Agano-class light cruiser	6,652	30 June 1943	26 October 1944; Sunk by USN aircraft south of Mindoro
Yahagi	Sasebo Navy Yard	Agano-class light cruiser	6,650	29 December 1943	7 April 1945; Sunk by USN aircraft south of Kagoshima
Sakawa	Sasebo Navy Yard	Agano-class light cruiser	6,652	30 November 1944	10 October 1945; war prize to USA, expended at atomic bomb test at Bikini Atoll on 2 July 1946
Ōyodo	Kure Naval Arsenal	Ōyodo-class light cruiser	8,164	28 February 1943	25 July 1945; Sunk by USN aircraft at Kure
Ioshima	Harima Shipyards	Ioshima-class light cruiser	2,526	28 June 1944	19 September 1944; Sunk by USS Shad south of Cape Omaezaki
Yasoshima	Kiangnan Dockyard, China	Ioshima-class light cruiser	2,448	25 September 1944	25 November 1944; Sunk by USN aircraft west of Luzon

== See also ==
- List of Japanese battleships
- List of Japanese battlecruisers
- List of destroyers of Japan
- Submarines of the Imperial Japanese Navy

== Bibliography ==
- Jentschura, Hansgeorg; Jung, Dieter & Mickel, Peter (1977). Warships of the Imperial Japanese Navy, 1869–1945. Annapolis, Maryland: United States Naval Institute. ISBN 978-0-87021-893-4.
- Friedman, Norman (1985). "Japan". In Gray, Randal (ed.). Conway's All the World's Fighting Ships 1906–1921. Annapolis, Maryland: Naval Institute Press. pp. 221–251. ISBN 0-87021-907-3.
- Sturton, Ian (1980). "Japan". In Chesneau, Roger (ed.). Conway's All the World's Fighting Ships 1922–1946. Greenwich, UK: Conway Maritime Press. pp. 167–217. ISBN 0-85177-146-7.
- Watts, A. J. (1979). "Japan". In Chesneau, Roger & Kolesnik, Eugene M. (eds.). Conway's All the World's Fighting Ships 1860–1905. New York: Mayflower Books. pp. 216–239. ISBN 0-8317-0302-4.
