= Shigematsu Sakaibara =

Japanese officer, war criminal 1898–1947

- 酒井原 繁松
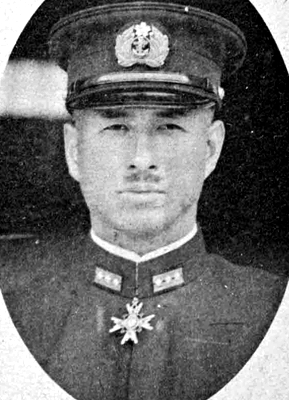
- Born: December 28, 1898; Yamagata Prefecture, Japan
- Died: June 19, 1947 (aged 48); Asan-Maina, Guam
- Education: Imperial Japanese Navy Academy
- Military career
- Allegiance: Empire of Japan
- Branch: Imperial Japanese Navy
- Service years: 1918–1945
- Rank: Rear Admiral
- Units: Tokiwa, Hirado, Kaba, Mutsu, Iwate, Hiei, Yura, Sendai, Tatsuta, Takao, Chikuma
- Commands: 65th Base Garrison (Wake Island)
- Conflicts: World War II; Battle of Wake Island
- Criminal information
- Known for: Wake Island massacre
- Status: Executed by hanging
- Conviction: War crimes
- Penalty: Death

Details
- Victims: 98
- Date: October 7, 1943
- Location: Wake Island
- Target: American civilians

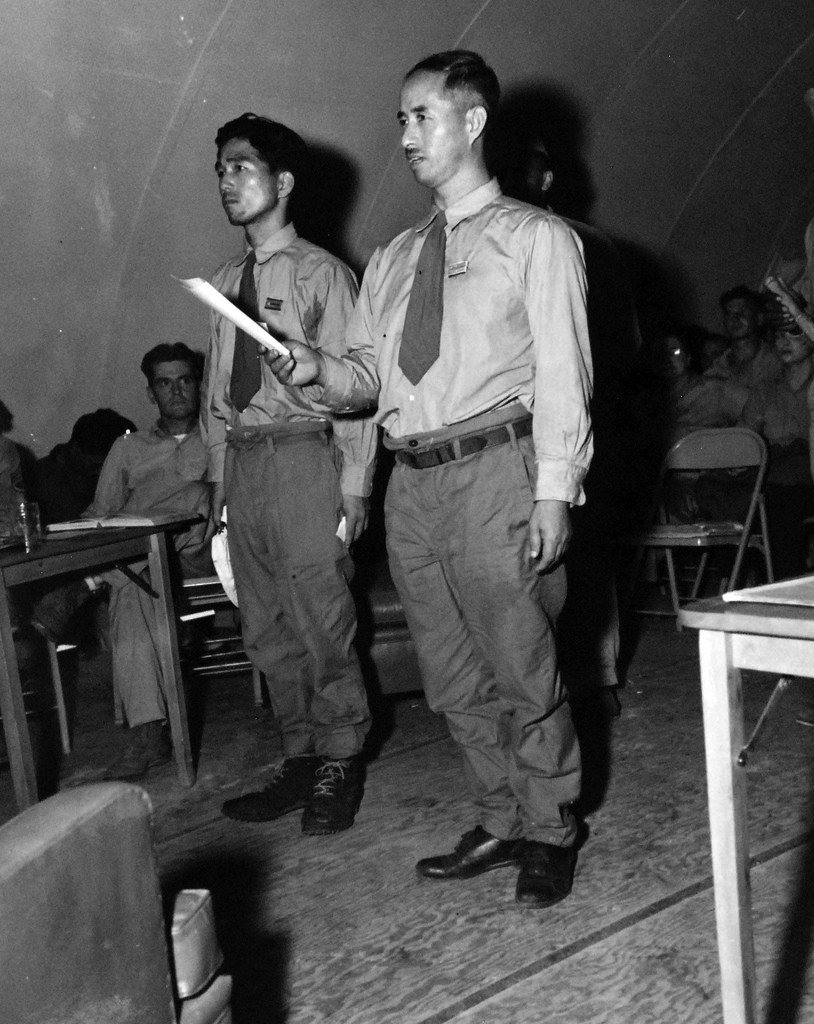
Sakaibara reads his final statement before being sentenced for ordering the Wake Island massacre (December 27, 1945)

Shigematsu Sakaibara (酒井原 繁松, Sakaibara Shigematsu; December 28, 1898 – June 19, 1947) was an admiral in the Imperial Japanese Navy, the Japanese garrison commander on Wake Island during World War II, and a convicted war criminal.

He was responsible for ordering the Wake Island massacre, in which 98 American civilians were murdered by Japanese soldiers. Following Japan's surrender, Sakaibara was tried for war crimes and executed for his involvement.

== Biography ==
A native of Yamagata prefecture in northern Japan, Sakaibara was a graduate of the 46th class of the Imperial Japanese Navy Academy in 1918, placing 36th in a class of 124. He served his midshipman tour on the cruiser Tokiwa, and after his commission as an ensign, was assigned to Hirado. He later served on the destroyer Kaba and battleship Mutsu.

As a sub-lieutenant, he served on the Iwate and after his promotion to lieutenant on December 1, 1924, he was assigned to the Hiei, Yura, and Sendai. He was chief gunnery officer on the Tatsuta. Promoted to lieutenant commander in 1930, he served as chief gunnery officer on Takao in 1934, followed by Mutsu in 1935. He was executive officer on Chikuma in 1939. After his promotion to captain in 1940, he served in a number of staff positions.

After the Battle of Wake Island on December 23, 1941, Sakaibara was appointed the garrison commander of the Japanese occupation force. Fearing an imminent attempt by American forces to retake the island, Sakaibara put 98 American civilians they had captured to work building a series of bunkers and fortifications in preparation for a suspected amphibious invasion.

On October 5, 1943, aircraft from USS Yorktown bombed Wake Island. Two days later, Sakaibara ordered the beheading of an American civilian worker who was caught stealing. Fearing an invasion, Sakaibara ordered the rest of them to be killed. They were taken to the northern end of the island, blindfolded and machine-gunned. One prisoner (whose name has never been discovered) escaped, carved a message into a rock about the incident but was then recaptured and personally beheaded by Sakaibara.

However, despite the massive assembly, the attack never came. Instead the United States Navy established a submarine blockade, causing the Japanese garrison to starve. United States forces bombed the island periodically from 1942 until Japan's surrender in 1945.

Sakaibara was promoted to rear admiral a year later, on October 15, 1944. The Japanese garrison on Wake Island formally surrendered to the United States on September 4, 1945.

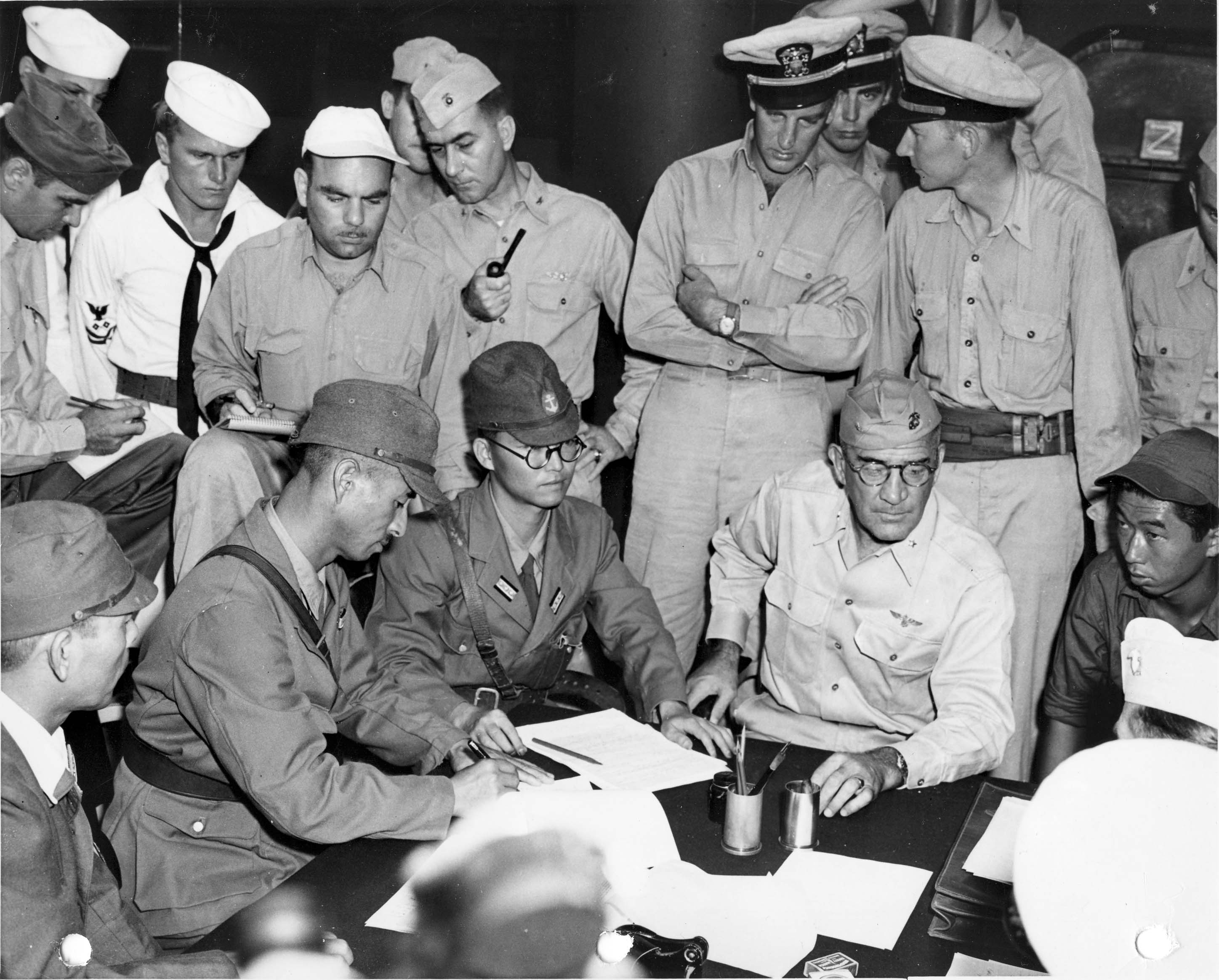
Admiral Shigematsu Sakaibara (seated second from left) signing the surrender of Wake Island aboard USS Levy on September 4, 1945

After the war, Sakaibara, his subordinate, Lieutenant Commander Shoichi Tachibana, and Toraji Ito, were taken into custody by the American occupation authorities. They initially claimed that the victims were killed in a bombing raid by U.S. forces, but later confessed to the massacre.

Sakaibara, Tachibana, and Ito were extradited to Kwajalein Island, where they were tried for war crimes by a U.S. military commission. Ito killed himself in custody. Sakaibara and Tachibana were both found guilty and sentenced to death in December 1945. Tachibana's sentence was commuted to life in prison, and he was sent to Sugamo Prison to serve out his sentence. Sakaibara was extradited to Guam for execution.

Just before he was sentenced, Sakaibara read out a final statement to the commission. He admitted that what he did was wrong and said he wished that he had never heard of Wake Island. However, Sakaibara also claimed that the United States had no moral authority to try him or others after using nuclear weapons on Japan. With that statement, many people in Sakaibara's hometown saw him as a victim of victor's justice.

Sakaibara was hanged in Guam on June 19, 1947. Until the end, he maintained, "I think my trial was entirely unfair and the proceeding unfair, and the sentence too harsh, but I obey with pleasure."
