= Ro-53 =

Ro-53 may refer to:

- Japanese submarine Ro-53, an Imperial Japanese Navy submarine in commission from 1921 to 1938
- Ro-53-class submarine, an alternative name for the L2 subclass of the Japanese Type L submarine
