= Japanese cruiser Tatsuta (1918) =

1918 Tenryū-class cruiser

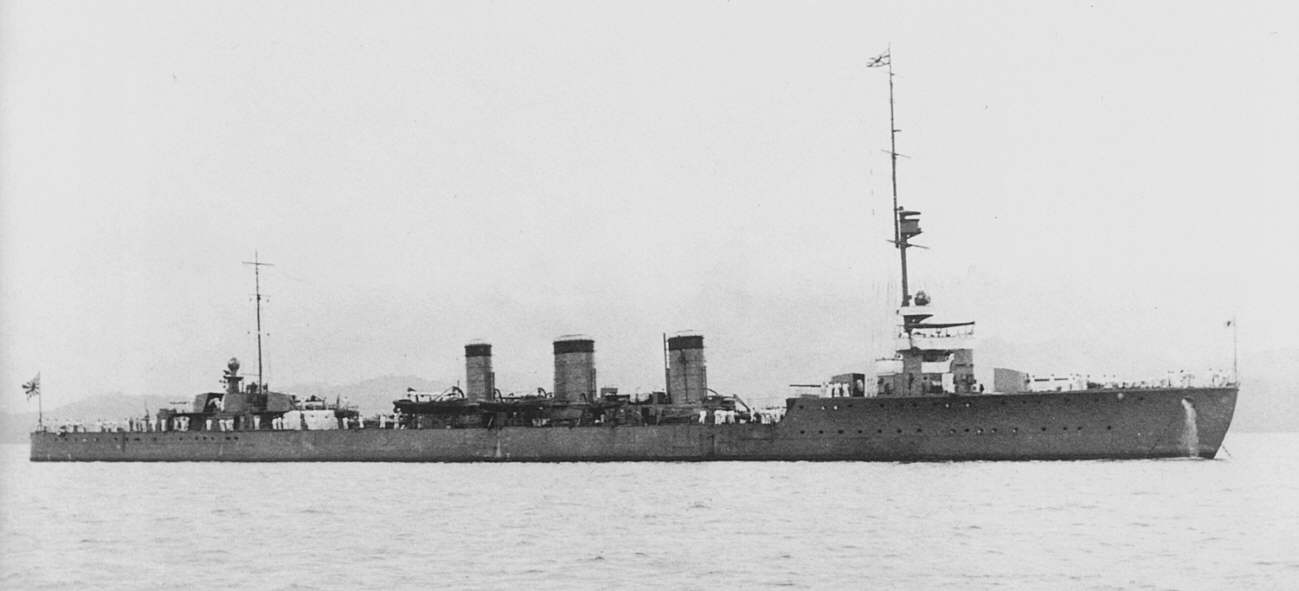
- Tatsuta in August 1919

History

Empire of Japan
- Name: Tatsuta
- Namesake: Tatsuta River
- Ordered: 1915 Fiscal Year
- Builder: Sasebo Naval Arsenal
- Laid down: 24 July 1917
- Launched: 29 May 1918
- Commissioned: 31 May 1919
- Out of service: 13 March 1944
- Stricken: 10 May 1944
- Fate: Sunk by USS Sand Lance NNE of Hachijōjima

General characteristics
- Class & type: Tenryū-class cruiser
- Displacement: 3,948 long tons (4,011 t) standard; 4,350 long tons (4,420 t) full load
- Length: 142.9 m (468 ft 10 in) o/a
- Beam: 12.3 m (40 ft 4 in)
- Draught: 4 m (13 ft 1 in)
- Propulsion: 3 shaft Brown Curtiss geared turbine engines; 10 Kampon boilers; 51,000 shp (38,000 kW); 920 tons oil, 150 tons coal
- Speed: 33 knots (38 mph; 61 km/h)
- Range: 5,000 nmi (9,300 km) at 14 kn (16 mph; 26 km/h)
- Complement: 327
- Armament: 4 × 14 cm/50 3rd Year Type naval guns; 1 × 8 cm/40 3rd Year Type naval gun; 2 × Type 93 13 mm AA machine guns; 6 × 533 mm (21.0 in) Type 6 torpedo tubes (2x3)
- Armour: Belt: 63 mm (2.5 in); Deck: 25 mm (1 in); Conning tower: 51 mm (2 in)

Tatsuta (龍田) was the second ship in the two ship Tenryū class of light cruisers in the Imperial Japanese Navy (IJN). She was named after the Tatsuta River in Nara Prefecture, Japan.

== Background ==
The Tenryū class was designed to act as flagships for destroyer flotillas. The design represented an intermediate class between the light cruiser and the destroyer, which had few counterparts in other navies of the time, although it was inspired by a similar concept to the Royal Navy's Arethusa and C-class cruisers. The IJN and Japanese shipbuilding industry were still closely associated with that of the British because of the Anglo-Japanese Alliance, and were able to improve on that experience.

== Design ==
The Tenryū-class vessels, termed "small-model" (or "3,500-Ton") cruisers, were designed as fast flotilla leaders for the Imperial Navy's new first- and second-class destroyers. With improvements in oil-fired turbine engine technology and the use of Brown Curtiss geared turbine engines, the Tenryū class had more than twice the horsepower of the previous Chikuma class, and were capable of the high speed of 33 knots (61 km/h), which was deemed necessary in their role as flagships for destroyer squadrons. However, by the time of their completion, newer Japanese destroyers, such as the Minekaze class had a design speed of 39 knots (72 km/h), and newer American cruisers, such as the Omaha class also exceeded it in firepower.

In terms of weaponry, the Tenryū class was weaker than any other contemporary cruiser. The main battery consisted of four 14 cm/50 3rd Year Type naval guns, which were also utilized as the secondary battery on the Ise-class battleships. However, the guns were situated in single mounts on the centerline, with only a limited angle of fire, and could fire only one gun at a target immediately in front or aft of the vessel. A further weakness was the lack of room for anti-aircraft guns. Despite awareness increasing about the growing threat of aircraft to surface ships, the secondary battery of the Tenryū class consisted of only a single dual-purpose 8 cm/40 3rd Year Type naval guns, plus two 6.5 mm machine guns. The class also was the first to use triple torpedo launchers, with two centerline-mounted Type 6 533 mm (21 in) launchers. No reloads were carried.

== Service career ==
=== Early career ===
Tatsuta was completed at the Sasebo Naval Arsenal on 31 March 1919, and was assigned as flagship of the 1st Destroyer Squadron based at the Sasebo Naval District, replacing the cruiser Tone.

The following year, Tatsuta was assigned to the IJN 2nd Fleet, and patrolled the east coast of Russia, providing support to Japanese troops in the Siberian Intervention against the Bolshevik Red Army. She was transferred to the reserves at Sasebo on 1 December 1921. Tatsuta was reactivated for one year, from 1 December 1922 to 1 December 1923, and again from 6 June - 31 August 1926, when she was assigned to patrols of the mouth of the Yangtze River.

In 1923, in the aftermath of the Great Kantō earthquake, Tatsuta made use of its high speed to transport emergency relief supplies from Kure to Tokyo.

During maneuvers on 19 March 1924, Tatsuta was involved in a collision 3 nautical miles (5.6 km; 3.5 mi) outside Sasebo harbor, where she rammed and sank the submarine Submarine No. 43 (later raised, repaired, and returned to service as Ro-25) with the loss of submarine's entire crew of 46.

Tatsuta was refitted in late 1926, when she was given a tripod foremast, serving on active duty again from 1 December 1926 to 1 December 1927, and from December 1930 to November 1931.

On 6 March 1934, during fleet maneuvers off Sasebo, the torpedo boat Tomozuru capsized due to design defects in what later came to be known as the Tomozuru Incident. Tatsuta found the capsized vessel and towed it back to Sasebo for examination. From 15 November 1934, Tatsuta, under the command of Captain Chūichi Hara, was made flagship of the 5th Destroyer Squadron within the IJN 3rd Fleet and was assigned to patrols of the China coast. She was relieved by the new cruiser Yūbari on 15 November 1935 and returned to Sasebo.

From November 1936, Tatsuta was paired with her sister ship Tenryū in the 10th Cruiser Squadron of the IJN 3rd Fleet, replacing the cruiser Kuma. As the situation between Japan and China deteriorated into the Second Sino-Japanese War, Tatsuta supported the landings of the Imperial Japanese Army and Japanese naval forces in Shanghai, and the blockade of the Chinese coast. As a component of the IJN 5th Fleet, on 10 May 1938 she covered the landing of Japanese forces at Amoy and on 1 July 1938 supported operations in Guangzhou. Tatsuta and Tenryū operated in Chinese waters until 14 December 1938, when they were withdrawn from front line service and assigned to the reserves. From 1 December 1939, Tatsuta was based at Maizuru Naval District.

However, from 15 November 1940, in preparation for the upcoming hostilities with the United States, Tenryū and Tatsuta were extensively modernized and renovated. Their coal/oil boilers were replaced with oil-fired boilers and a steel roof replaced the former canvas covering of the bridge. The two Type 93 13.2 mm (0.52 in) AA machine guns (which had been added in 1937) were replaced with two twin-mountType 96 25 mm AA guns.

=== Early Pacific War ===
From 12 September 1941, Tatsuta and Tenryū were redeployed to Truk, in the Caroline Islands, as CruDiv 18 of the Fourth Fleet. At the time of the attack on Pearl Harbor, CruDiv 18 had deployed from Kwajalein as part of the Wake Island invasion force. Tatsuta was strafed with machine-gun fire by a USMC Grumman Wildcat on 11 December, but otherwise suffered no damage during the first Battle of Wake Island. Tatsuta also participated in the second (successful) invasion attempt on Wake Island on 21 December.

On 20 January 1942, Tatsuta and Tenryū were assigned to cover troop transports during the invasion of Kavieng, New Ireland and Gasmata, New Britain from 3–9 February, and patrolled from Truk in late February.

During a refit at Truk on 23 February, two additional Type 96 twin-mount 25 mm AA guns were installed aft, as part of the heightened awareness of the threat posed by American aircraft.

=== Solomon Islands and New Guinea campaigns ===
From March, Tatsuta with CruDiv 18 covered numerous troop landings throughout the Solomon Islands and New Guinea, including Lae and Salamaua, Buka, Bougainville, Rabaul, Shortland, and Kieta, and Manus Island, Admiralty Islands, and Tulagi returning to Truk on 10 April.

Tatsuta and Tenryū were both assigned to the aborted "Operation Mo" (the occupation of Port Moresby, and covered the establishment of a seaplane base at Rekata Bay at Santa Isabel Island from 3–5 May. The operation was cancelled following the Battle of the Coral Sea, and Tatsuta was recalled to Maizuru Naval Arsenal in Japan for repairs on 24 May, remaining for a month. On 23 June, she returned to Truk. Tatsuta and Tenryū escorted a convoy to Guadalcanal on 6 July, which contained an engineering battalion assigned to build an airstrip.

On 14 July 1942, in a major reorganization of the Japanese navy, CruDiv 18 under Rear Admiral Mitsuharu Matsuyama came under the newly created IJN Eighth Fleet, commanded by Vice Admiral Gunichi Mikawa and based at Rabaul. On 20 July, Tatsuta was assigned to cover Japanese troop landings in the invasion of Buna, New Guinea ("Operation RI"). The invasion force was attacked by USAAF Boeing B-17 Flying Fortress and Martin B-26 Marauder bombers on its return to Rabaul, but Tatsuta was unharmed. Tatsuta escorted three more convoys to Buna in August, two of which were successful.

On 25 August, Tatsuta was again bombed by B-17s during its coverage of the landing of 1,200 troops of the Kure No. 5 Special Naval Landing Force at Milne Bay, New Guinea ("Operation RE"), again escaping without damage. On 6 September, Tatsuta was part of the force assigned to evacuate the surviving troops after their defeat. On 6 October, Tatsuta was tasked with the mission to transport the Seventeenth Army led by General Harukichi Hyakutake and troops to Guadalcanal, followed by escort of two "Tokyo Express" high speed transport runs with supplies and reinforcements in October.

On 1 November, Tatsuta was designated flagship of CruDiv18 under Admiral Mitsuharu Matsuya. However, due to damage to her rudder, she remained at Truk from 5 November to 12 January 1943.

=== Return to Japan ===
Tatsuta returned to Maizuru on 19 January - 28 March 1943 for repairs, and remained in Japan until October making training cruises in the Seto Inland Sea with newly commissioned destroyers of the 11th Destroyer Squadron of the IJN 1st Fleet. On 8 June, while Tatsuta was moored near Hashirajima, the battleship Mutsu exploded and sank due to an accidental magazine explosion. Tatsuta participated in the rescue operation and recovered 39 wounded survivors.

During overhaul at Kure Naval Arsenal from 12 August to 9 September 1943, her anti-aircraft weaponry was increased by an additional twin-mount Type 96 25 mm AA gun, and possibly by a Type 22 radar.

In view of the worsening military situation for Japan on the islands of the Pacific, on 20 October 1943 "Tatsuta" was sent to Truk and made several troop transport runs to Ponape over the next couple of weeks. On its return to Japan on 5 November, the Tatsuta convoy was attacked by the submarine USS Halibut near the Bungo Channel. However, Halibut's main target was the aircraft carrier Jun'yō and battleship Yamashiro, and Tatsuta was ignored.

From 15 December 1943, Rear Admiral Tamotsu Takama assumed command of DesRon11, which was subordinated to the Combined Fleet from 25 February 1944.

On 12 March 1944, Tatsuta departed Kisarazu, Chiba with a major reinforcement convoy to Saipan. On 13 March 1944 the convoy was attacked by the submarine USS Sand Lance, on her first war patrol, 40 miles (64 km) NNE of Hachijōjima (32°52′N 139°12′E). One or two torpedoes hit Tatsuta, on her starboard side. Twenty-six crewmen were killed and ten injured, and she sank after her crew attempted to control the damage for several hours. The destroyers Nowaki and Uzuki rescued the survivors including Captain Torii and Rear Admiral Takama. The freighter Kokuyo Maru (4667 GRT) was also sunk in the same attack.

Tatsuta was stricken from the navy list on 10 May 1944.

== Gallery ==
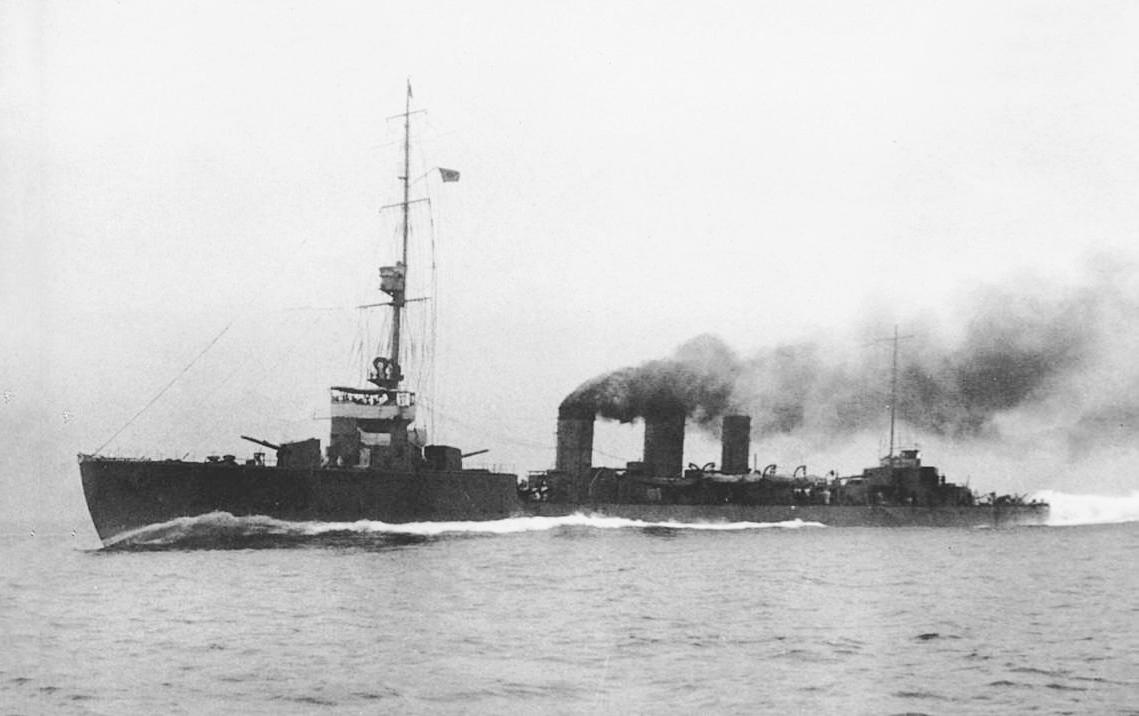
In 1919

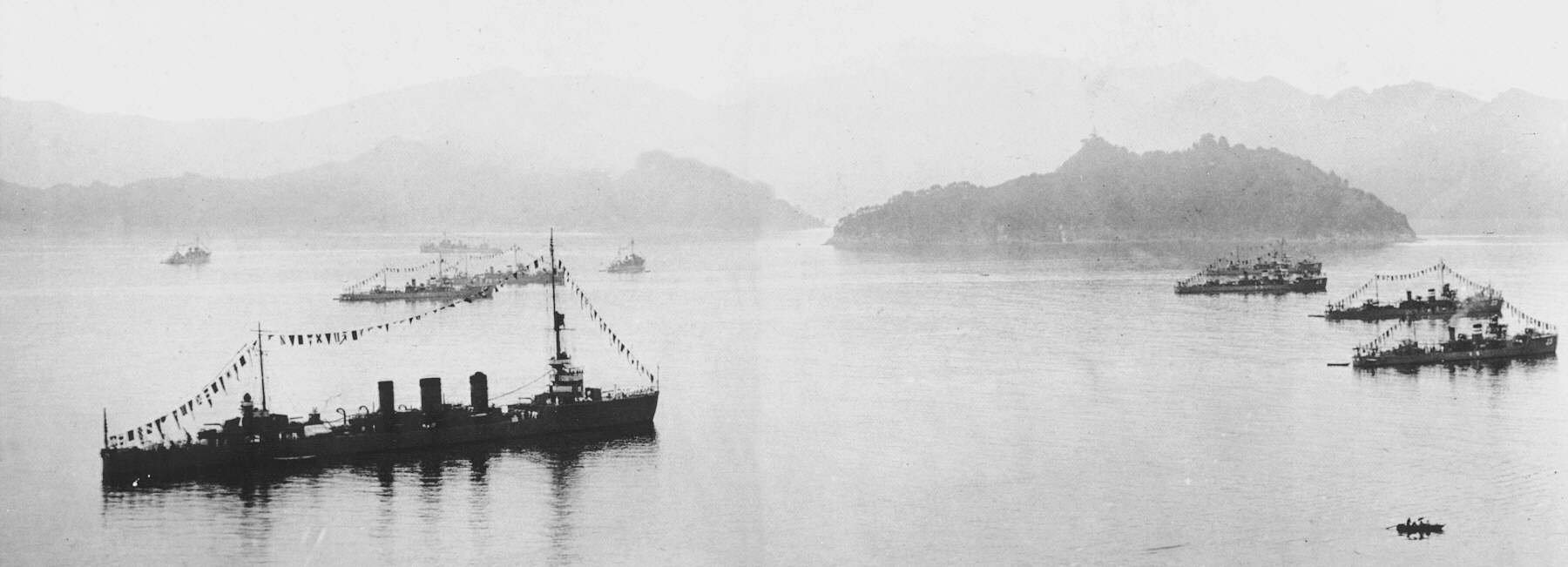
In the Inland Sea with destroyer flotilla, 1920s

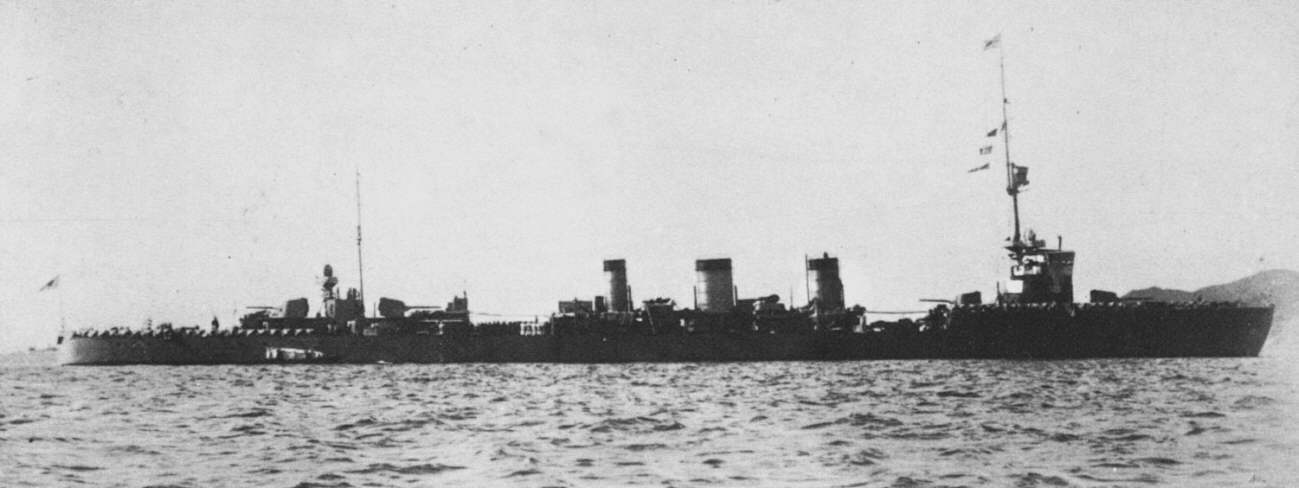
At Kure in 1928

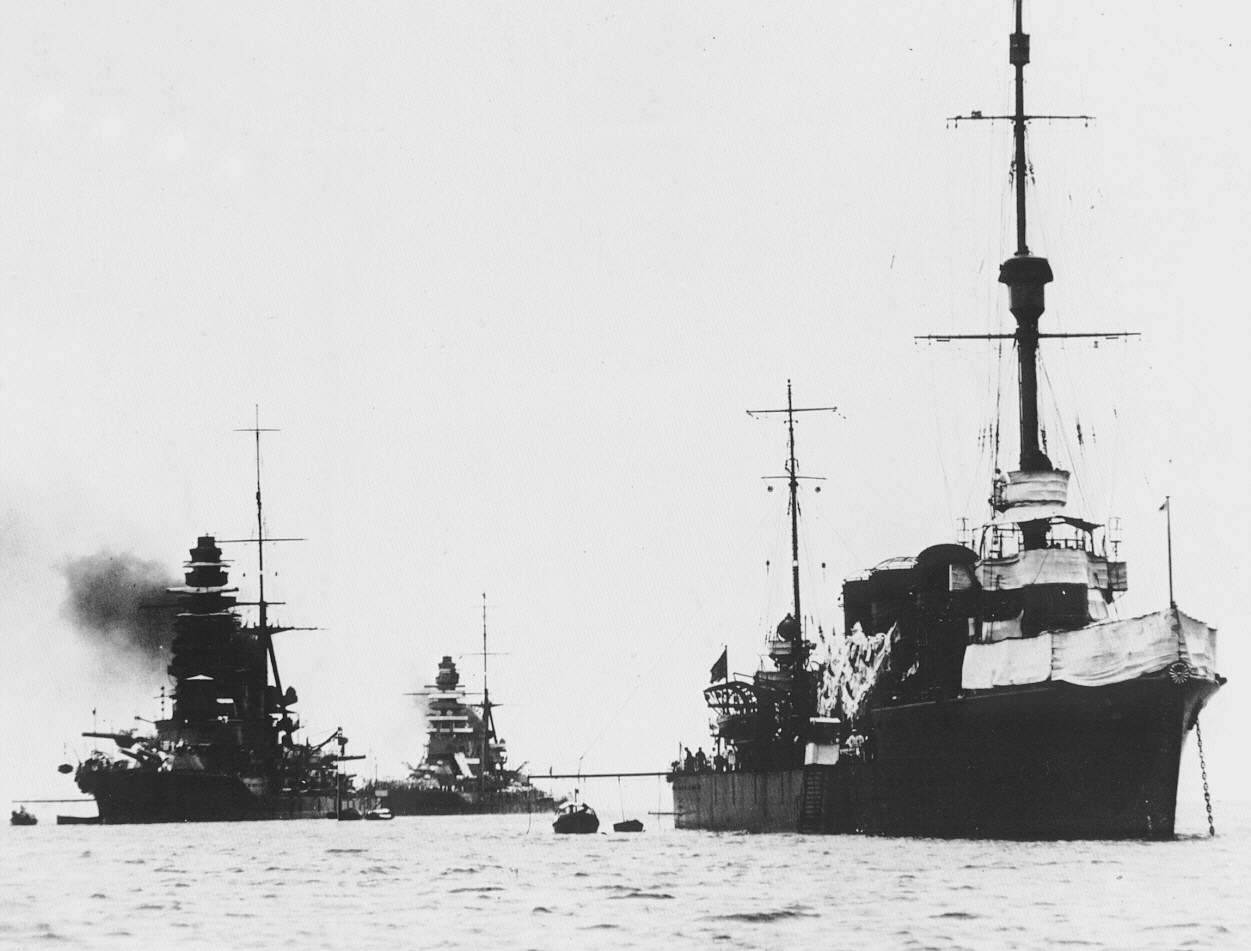
In 1927 with battleships Nagato and Mutsu

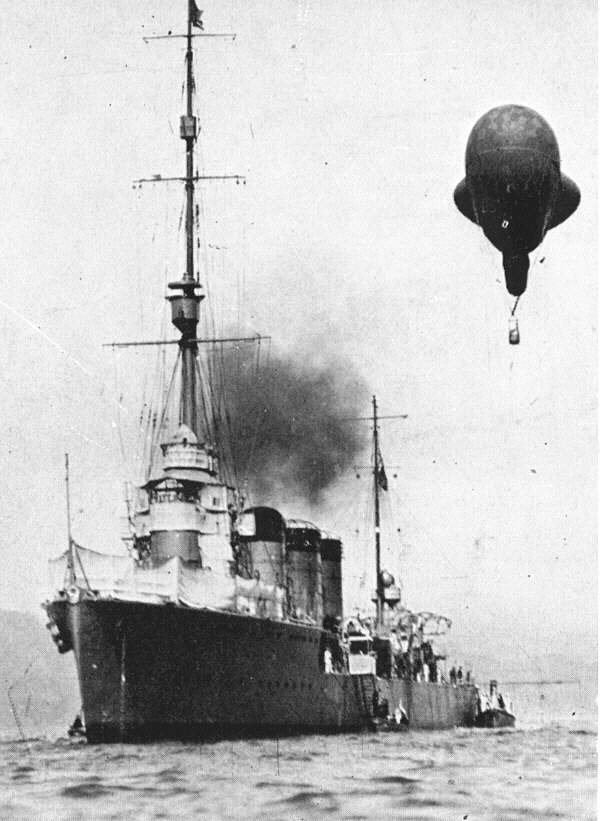
In 1927 with weather balloon

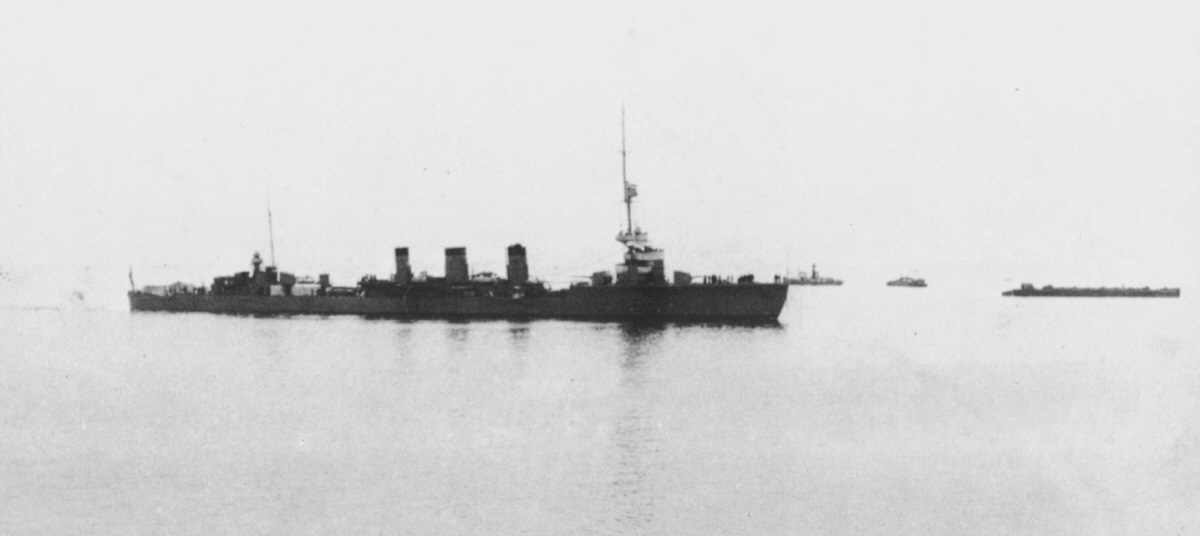
In May 1932
