= Japanese cruiser Chikuma (1911) =

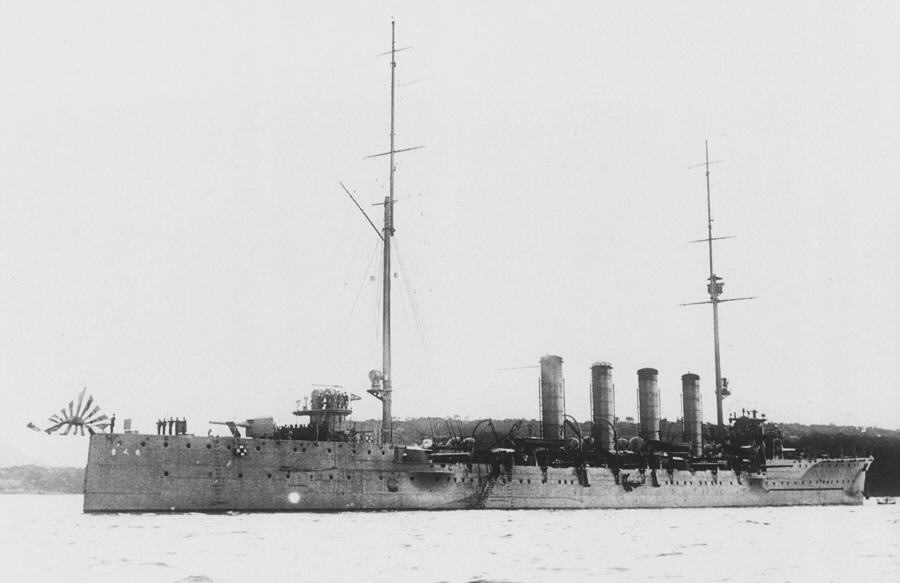
- Chikuma in 1912 during commissioning

History

Empire of Japan
- Name: Chikuma
- Namesake: Chikuma River
- Ordered: 1907 Fiscal Year
- Builder: Sasebo Naval Arsenal
- Laid down: 1 April 1909
- Launched: 1 April 1911
- Completed: 17 May 1912
- Stricken: 1 April 1931
- Fate: Sunk as a target ship, 1935

General characteristics
- Class & type: Chikuma-class protected cruiser
- Displacement: 5,040 long tons (5,121 t)
- Length: 144.8 m (475 ft 1 in)
- Beam: 14.2 m (46 ft 7 in)
- Draught: 5.1 m (16 ft 9 in)
- Propulsion: 2 shaft Curtiss steam turbines; 16 Kampon boilers; 22,500 hp (16,800 kW); 1,128 tons coal, 300 tons oil
- Speed: 26 knots (30 mph; 48 km/h)
- Range: 10,000 nmi (19,000 km) at 10 kn (12 mph; 19 km/h)
- Armament: 8 × Type 41 6 inch 45 caliber naval guns; 4 × QF 12 pounder 12 cwt naval guns; 2 × 7.7 mm Lewis Guns; 3 × 450 mm (18 in) torpedo tubes
- Armour: Belt: 50–89 mm (2.0–3.5 in); Deck: 37–57 mm (1.5–2.2 in); Conning tower: 100 mm (3.9 in)

Chikuma (筑摩) was the lead ship in the Chikuma class of protected cruisers of the Imperial Japanese Navy. Chikuma had two sister ships, Hirado and the Yahagi. Chikuma was named for the Chikuma River in Nagano prefecture.

== Background ==
The Chikuma-class protected cruisers were built as part of the 1907 Naval Expansion Program, based on lessons learned during the Russo-Japanese War. Chikuma was laid down at Sasebo Naval Arsenal in Nagasaki Prefecture, Japan on 1 April 1909, launched on 1 April 1911 and entered service on 17 May 1912.

== Design ==
The basic design of the Chikuma-class cruisers was modeled after the Royal Navy Town class with some modifications and was also largely influenced by the design of the cruiser Tone The silhouette of the Chikuma class was readily distinguishable due to its four tall smokestacks.

Chikuma had a hull with an overall length of 144.8 metres (475 ft) and width of 14.2 metres (47 ft), with a normal displacement of 5040 tons and draft of 5.1 metres (17 ft).

Chikuma was propelled by two Curtis steam turbine engines (produced by Kawasaki, with a total capacity of 22,500 shp (16,800 kW), which drove two screws. The engine had 16 Kampon boilers. These newly developed engines gave the ship an incredible (for the time) 26.87-knot (49.76 km/h; 30.92 mph) speed in trials, but problems with material strength in the gears of the new engines created a maintenance nightmare, and Chikuma could seldom live up to her potential. The ship was armed with eight 15 cm/45 41st Year Type guns, one each fore and aft, and three mounted in sponsons on each side of the hull. Ships of the Chikuma-class were unusual in having the same weapons for its side armament as for its main battery. These guns were supplemented by four QF 12-pounder 12 cwt naval guns and two 7.7 mm Lewis Guns. In addition, she carried three torpedo launchers with 457 mm (18 in) torpedoes. After 1919, two 8 cm/40 3rd Year Type naval gun were added for anti-aircraft defense abeam of the fourth funnel, replacing three of the 12-pounders.

== Service record ==
Chikuma participated in World War I, as part of Japan's contribution to the Allied war effort under the Anglo-Japanese Alliance. She was in the Japanese squadron which gave chase to the German East Asia Squadron led by Admiral Graf Maximilian von Spee in 1914. The Imperial Japanese Navy also dispatched the cruisers Ibuki, Chikuma and Nisshin to the Indian Ocean to deal with the threat posed to shipping by the German cruiser Emden.

From December 1914 to January 1915, Chikuma and Yahagi were assigned to patrols off the coast of northern Queensland, Australia and on 26 March 1917, the British Admiralty further requested the deployment of Chikuma and Hirado to Australia and New Zealand to protect shipping against German commerce raiding operations.

After World War I, Chikuma was assigned to patrols of the China coast from 1921 to 1924. After 1924, she was deemed too obsolete to be of any further combat use, and was primarily used as a moored training ship at Yokosuka Naval District after having been officially transferred to the reserves.

Chikuma was officially stricken from the navy list on 1 April 1931. Her hulk was designated Hai Kan No. 3 and expended as a target in 1935.
