= Japanese submarine Ro-53 =

History

Japan
- Name: Submarine No. 27
- Builder: Mitsubishi, Kobe, Japan
- Laid down: 1 April 1919
- Launched: 6 July 1920
- Completed: 10 March 1921
- Commissioned: 10 March 1921
- Renamed: Ro-53 on 1 November 1924
- Decommissioned: 15 December 1938
- Stricken: 1 April 1940
- Fate: Hulked 1 April 1940
- Renamed: Haisen No. 11 on 1 April 1940

General characteristics
- Class & type: Japanese Type L submarine (L2 subclass)
- Displacement: 907 tonnes (893 long tons) surfaced; 1,093 tonnes (1,075.3 long tons) submerged
- Length: 70.59 m (231 ft 7 in) overall
- Beam: 7.16 m (23 ft 6 in)
- Draft: 3.94 m (12 ft 11 in)
- Installed power: 2,400 bhp (1,800 kW) (diesel); 1,600 shp (1,200 kW) (electric motor)
- Propulsion: Diesel-electric; 2 × Vickers diesel engines, 75 tons fuel; 2 × electric motor; 2 x shafts
- Speed: 17.3 knots (32.0 km/h; 19.9 mph) surfaced; 10.4 knots (19.3 km/h; 12.0 mph) submerged
- Range: 5,500 nmi (10,200 km; 6,300 mi) at 10 knots (19 km/h; 12 mph) surfaced; 80 nmi (150 km; 92 mi) at 4 knots (7.4 km/h; 4.6 mph) submerged
- Test depth: 60 m (197 ft)
- Crew: 45
- Armament: 4 × bow 450 mm (18 in) torpedo tubes; 8 x Type 44 torpedoes; 1 × 76.2 mm (3 in) gun

Ro-53, originally named Submarine No. 27, was an Imperial Japanese Navy Type L submarine, the lead unit of the L2 subclass. She was in commission from 1921 to 1938.

== Design and description ==
The submarines of the Type L2 sub-class were close copies of the British L-class submarine built under license in Japan. They differed from the preceding L1 subclass in the deletion of the two broadside-firing torpedo tubes and the two torpedoes for them, the use of domestically produced diesel engines and batteries, and a different battery arrangement. They displaced 907 tonnes (893 long tons) surfaced and 1,093 tonnes (1,075.3 long tons) submerged. The submarines were 70.59 meters (231 ft 7 in) long and had a beam of 7.16 meters (23 ft 6 in) and a draft of 3.94 meters (12 ft 11 in). They had a diving depth of 60 meters (197 ft).

For surface running, the submarines were powered by two 1,200-brake-horsepower (895 kW) Vickers diesel engines, each driving one propeller shaft. When submerged, each propeller was driven by an 800-shaft-horsepower (597 kW) electric motor. They could reach 17.3 knots (32.0 km/h; 19.9 mph) on the surface and 10.4 knots (19.3 km/h; 12.0 mph) underwater. On the surface, they had a range of 5,500 nautical miles (10,200 km; 6,300 mi) at 10 knots (19 km/h; 12 mph); submerged, they had a range of 80 nmi (150 km; 92 mi) at 4 knots (7.4 km/h; 4.6 mph).

The submarines were armed with four internal 450 mm (18 in) torpedo tubes, all in the bow, and carried a total of eight Type 44 torpedoes. They were also armed with a single 76.2 mm (3 in) deck gun.

== Construction and commissioning ==
Ro-53 was laid down as Submarine No. 27 on 1 April 1919 by Mitsubishi at Kobe, Japan. Launched on 6 July 1920, she was completed and commissioned on 10 March 1921.

== Service history ==
Upon commissioning, Submarine No. 27 was assigned to Submarine Division 3 in Submarine Squadron 1 in the 1st Fleet. Submarine Division 3 was attached to the Yokosuka Naval District on 1 December 1921 and was assigned that day to the Yokosuka Defense Division, then was reassigned on 1 June 1922 to the Ominato Defense Division.

On 1 December 1922, Submarine No. 27 was attached to the Kure Naval District and reassigned to Submarine Division 11, in both of which she remained for the rest of her active career. During the years that followed, Submarine No. 25 was assigned to the Kure Defense Division from 1 December 1922 to 1 December 1923 and was renamed Ro-53 on 1 November 1924. She had additional Kure Defense Division assignments from 1 December 1926 to 10 December 1928, from 30 November 1929 to 15 October 1931, and from 1 December 1932 to 8 October 1935.

Ro-53 was anchored at Takamatsu, Japan, on 21 April 1925 when a cargo ferry under tow by the Japanese Government Railways steamer Mitsuki Maru collided with her. From 27 March to 10 May 1935, Ro-53 and the protected cruiser Yahagi took part in the Hiroshima Prefecture National Defense and Industrial Great Exhibition at Kure, Japan, and were open to public tours. On 9 April 1938 she and her division mate Ro-51 got underway from Sasebo, Japan, for a training cruise in southern Chinese waters, which they concluded with their arrival at Kīrun, Formosa, on 14 April 1938.

Ro-53 was decommissioned and placed in the Fourth Reserve in the Kure Naval District on 15 December 1938. The Japanese struck her from the Navy list on 1 April 1940, and that day she became a stationary hulk with the name Haisen No. 11.

== Bibliography ==
- "Rekishi Gunzō"., History of Pacific War Extra, "Perfect guide, The submarines of the Imperial Japanese Forces", Gakken (Japan), March 2005, ISBN 4-05-603890-2
- The Maru Special, Japanese Naval Vessels No.43 Japanese Submarines III, Ushio Shobō (Japan), September 1980, Book code 68343-44
- The Maru Special, Japanese Naval Vessels No.132 Japanese Submarines I "Revised edition", Ushio Shobō (Japan), February 1988, Book code 68344-36
- The Maru Special, Japanese Naval Vessels No.133 Japanese Submarines II "Revised edition", Ushio Shobō (Japan), March 1988, Book code 68344-37
