= Japanese cruiser Hirado =

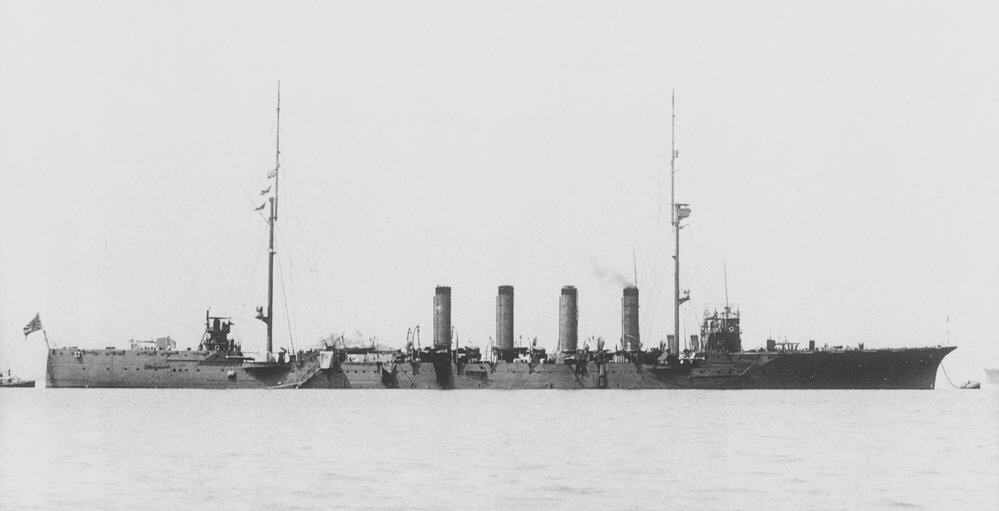
- Hirado in 1916

History

Empire of Japan
- Name: Hirado
- Namesake: Hirado, Nagasaki
- Ordered: 1907 Fiscal Year
- Builder: Kawasaki Shipbuilding Corporation, Kobe
- Laid down: 10 August 1910
- Launched: 29 June 1911
- Commissioned: 17 June 1912
- Stricken: 1 April 1940
- Fate: Scrapped, 1947

General characteristics
- Class & type: Chikuma-class protected cruiser
- Displacement: 5,040 long tons (5,121 t)
- Length: 144.8 m (475 ft 1 in)
- Beam: 14.2 m (46 ft 7 in)
- Draught: 5.1 m (16 ft 9 in)
- Propulsion: 2 shaft Curtiss steam turbines; 16 Kampon boilers; 22,500 hp (16,800 kW); 1,128 tons coal, 300 tons oil
- Speed: 26 knots (30 mph; 48 km/h)
- Range: 10,000 nmi (19,000 km) at 10 kn (12 mph; 19 km/h)
- Complement: 414
- Armament: 8 × Type 41 6 inch 45 caliber naval guns; 4 × QF 12 pounder 12 cwt naval guns; 2 × 7.7 mm Lewis Guns; 3 × 450 mm (18 in) torpedo tubes
- Armour: Belt: 50–89 mm (2.0–3.5 in); Deck: 37–57 mm (1.5–2.2 in); Conning tower: 100 mm (3.9 in)

Hirado (平戸) was the third and final vessel built of the Chikuma-class protected cruisers of the Imperial Japanese Navy. Hirado had two sister ships, Chikuma and Yahagi. She was named for after the island of Hirado, Nagasaki.

== Background ==
The Chikuma-class protected cruisers were built as part of the 1907 Naval Expansion Program, based on lessons learned during the Russo-Japanese War. Hirado was the last protected cruiser built for the Imperial Japanese Navy. Designed shortly after the Russo-Japanese War, she was laid down at Kawasaki Shipbuilding Corporation in Kobe on 10 August 1910, launched on 29 June 1911 and entered service on 17 June 1912.

== Design ==
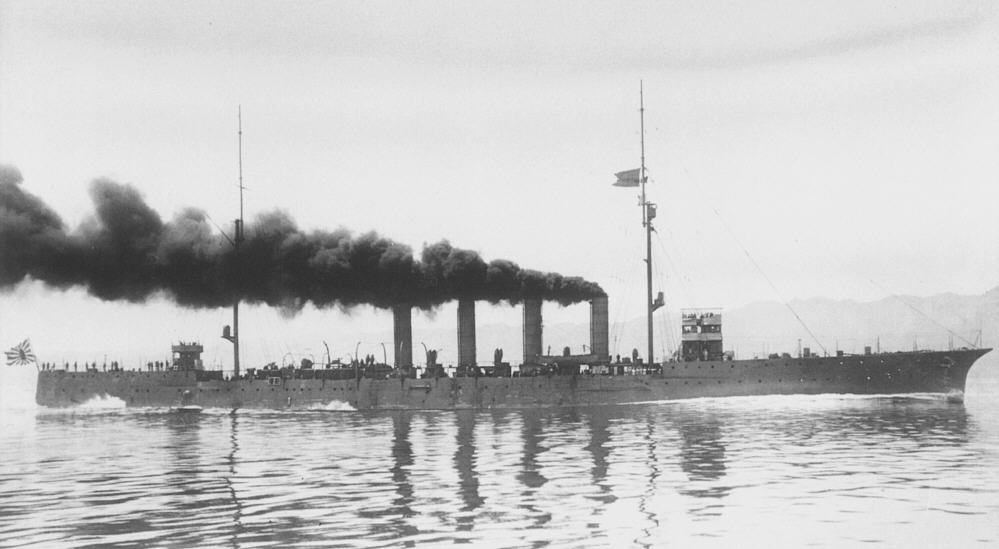
Hirado in 1912

The basic design of the Chikuma-class cruisers was modeled after the Royal Navy Town class with some modifications and was also largely influenced by the design of the cruiser Tone The silhouette of the Chikuma class was readily distinguishable due to its four tall smokestacks.

Hirado had a hull with an overall length of 144.8 metres (475 ft) and width of 14.2 metres (47 ft), with a normal displacement of 5040 tons and draft of 5.1 metres (17 ft).

Hirado was propelled by two Curtis steam turbine engines (produced by Kawasaki, with a total capacity of 22,500 shp (16,800 kW), which drove two screws. The engine had 16 Kampon boilers. These newly developed engines gave the ship an incredible (for the time) 26.87-knot (49.76 km/h; 30.92 mph) speed in trials, but problems with material strength in the gears of the new engines created a maintenance nightmare, and Hirado could seldom live up to her potential.

The ship was armed with eight 15 cm/45 41st Year Type guns, one each fore and aft, and three mounted in sponsons on each side of the hull. Ships of the Chikuma class were unusual in having the same weapons for their side armament as for their main battery. These gun were supplemented by four QF 12-pounder 12 cwt naval guns and two 7.7 mm Lewis guns. In addition, she carried three torpedo launchers with 457 mm (18 in) torpedoes. After 1919, two 8 cm/40 3rd Year Type naval gun were added for anti-aircraft defense abeam of the fourth funnel, replacing three of the 12-pounders.

== Service record ==
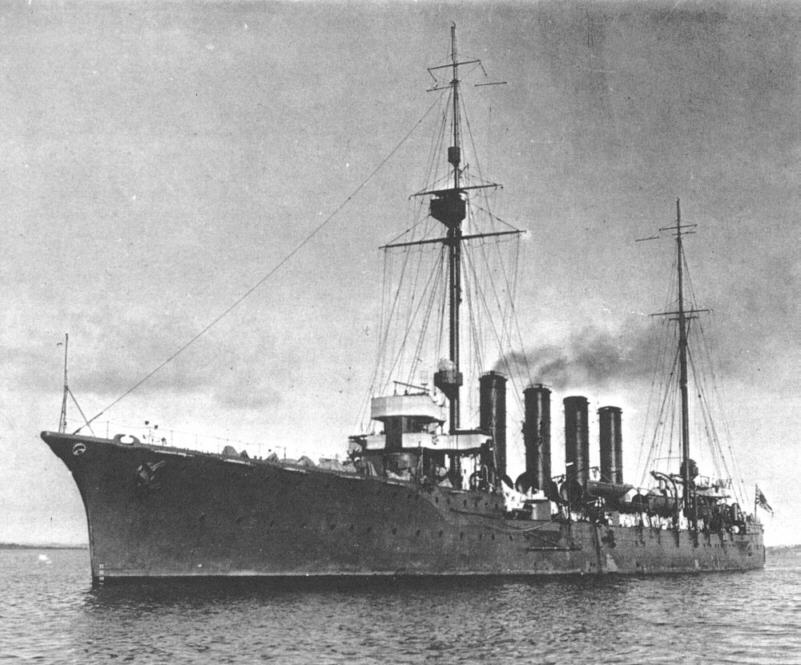
At Auckland, New Zealand in 1912

Hirado participated in World War I, as part of Japan's contribution to the Allied war effort under the Anglo-Japanese Alliance. She was in the Japanese squadron which gave chase to the German East Asia Squadron led by Admiral Graf Maximilian von Spee in 1914. Hirado and Yahagi were in the Allied 2nd Southern Squadron led by the battleship Satsuma and commanded by Rear-Admiral Matsumura Tatsuo, patrolling the region around Sumatra unsuccessfully for the German cruiser Emden.

On 26 March 1917, the British Admiralty further requested the deployment of Chikuma and Hirado to Australia and New Zealand to protect shipping against German commerce raiding operations.

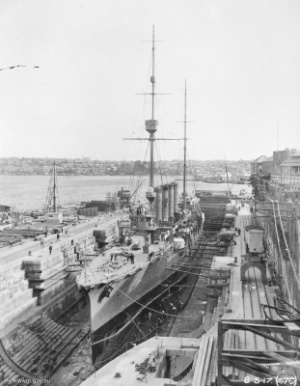
In dry dock at Cockatoo Island, Sydney 8 May 1917.

After the end of the war, Hirado was assigned to patrol off the east coast of Russia to provide protection and support for supply convoys to Japanese ground forces in Siberia during Japan's Siberian Intervention against the Bolshevik Red Army. During the inter-war period, future Fleet Admiral Osami Nagano was captain of Hirado from 1919 to 1920 (his only ship command), and by Captain Zengo Yoshida from March to December 1924.

During the 1920s and 1930s, Hirado was mostly assigned to guarding the southern approaches to Japan, and made frequent port calls to Manila and Macau. From 1932, she was reassigned to patrol the northern coast of China, as relations between Japan and China continued to deteriorate after the Manchurian Incident, and she was based at Ryojun Guard District in the Kwantung Leased Territory. However, problems with her engines resulted in frequent stays in repair yards, and she was unable to participate in any combat operations in the Second Sino-Japanese War.

Considered a reserve vessel in 1933 and used primarily for training thereafter, Hirado was officially stricken from the navy list on 1 April 1940. Re-designated Hai Kan No.11, the vessel was moored as a barracks ship at Etajima, and then Kure. She was towed to Iwasaki in December 1943. The hulk was scrapped from January through April 1947 by a Tokyo-based salvage company, becoming part of the breakwater at Iwakuni port.
