= Japanese cruiser Yahagi (1911) =

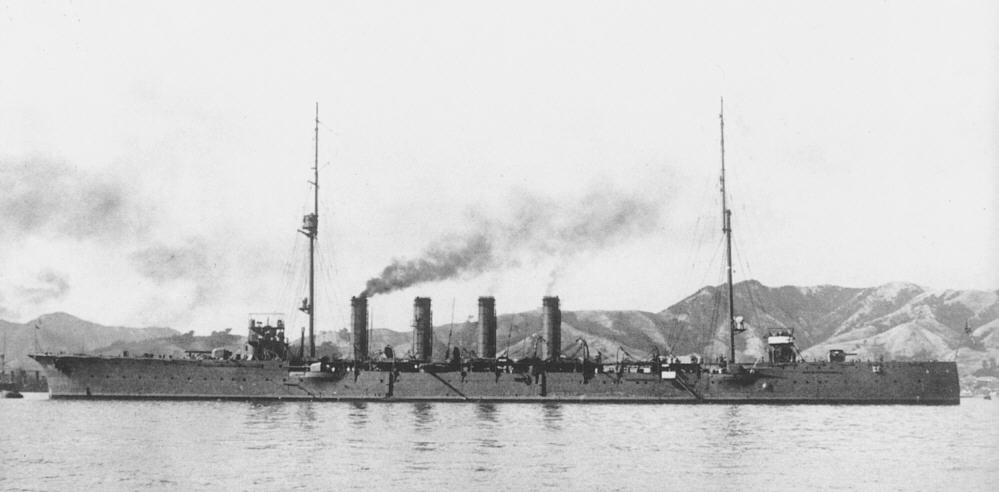
- Yahagi in 1916

History

Empire of Japan
- Name: Yahagi
- Namesake: Yahagi River
- Ordered: 1907 Fiscal Year
- Builder: Mitsubishi Heavy Industries, Nagasaki
- Laid down: 20 June 1910
- Launched: 3 October 1911
- Commissioned: 27 July 1912
- Stricken: 1 April 1940
- Fate: Scrapped, 1947

General characteristics
- Class & type: Chikuma-class protected cruiser
- Displacement: 5,040 long tons (5,121 t)
- Length: 144.8 m (475 ft 1 in) o/a
- Beam: 14.2 m (46 ft 7 in)
- Draught: 5.1 m (16 ft 9 in)
- Propulsion: 4 shaft Parsons turbine engines; 16 boilers; 22,500 hp (16,800 kW); 1,128 tons coal
- Speed: 26 knots (30 mph; 48 km/h)
- Range: 10,000 nmi (19,000 km) at 10 kn (12 mph; 19 km/h)
- Complement: 414
- Armament: 8 × 15 cm/45 41st Year Type guns; 4 × QF 12 pounder 12 cwt naval guns; 2 × 7.7 mm Lewis Guns; 3 × 457 mm (18.0 in) torpedo tubes
- Armour: Deck: 37–57 mm (1.5–2.2 in); Conning tower: 100 mm (3.9 in)

Yahagi (矢矧) was the second vessel in the Chikuma class of protected cruisers of the Imperial Japanese Navy. Yahagi had two sister ships, Chikuma and Hirado. She was named after the Yahagi River, which runs through Nagano, Gifu and Aichi prefectures.

== Background ==
The Chikuma-class light cruisers were built as part of the 1907 Naval Expansion Program, based on lessons learned during the Russo-Japanese War. Yahagi was laid down at Mitsubishi Heavy Industries in Nagasaki on 20 June 1910, launched on 3 October 1911 and entered service on 27 July 1912.

== Design ==
Yahagi had a hull with an overall length of 144.8 metres (475 ft) and width of 14.2 metres (47 ft), with a normal displacement of 5040 tons and draft of 5.1 metres (17 ft).

Yahagi was propelled by two Parsons steam turbine engines, with a total capacity of 22,500 shp (16,800 kW), which drove two screws. The engine had 16 Kampon boilers, which exhausted though four tall smokestacks. These newly developed engines gave the ship an incredible (for the time) 27.14-knot (50.26 km/h; 31.23 mph) speed, but problems with material strength in the gears of the new engines created a maintenance nightmare, and Yahagi could seldom live up to her potential.

The ship was armed with eight 15 cm/45 41st Year Type guns, one each fore and aft, and three mounted in sponsons on each side of the hull. Ships of the Chikuma class were unusual in having the same weapons for its side armament as for its main battery. These gun were supplemented by four QF 12-pounder 12 cwt naval guns and two 7.7 mm Lewis guns. In addition, she carried three torpedo launchers with 457 mm (18 in) torpedoes. After 1919, two 8 cm/40 3rd Year Type naval gun were added for anti-aircraft defense abeam of the fourth funnel, replacing three of the 12-pounders.

== Service record ==
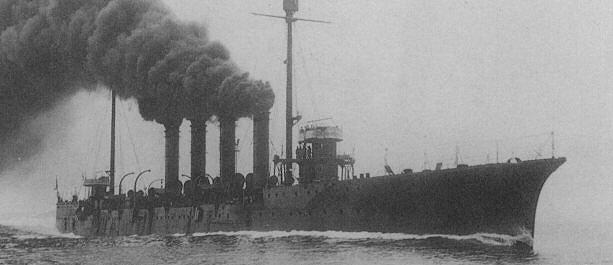
Yahagi in 1912

Yahagi participated in World War I as part of Japan's contribution to the Allied war effort under the Anglo-Japanese Alliance. She was in the Japanese squadron which gave chase to the German East Asia Squadron led by Admiral Graf Maximilian von Spee in 1914. Hirado and Yahagi were in the Allied 2nd Southern Squadron led by the battleship Satsuma and commanded by Rear-Admiral Matsumura Tatsuo, patrolling the region around Sumatra unsuccessfully for the German cruiser Emden.

From December 1914 to January 1915, Chikuma and Yahagi were assigned to patrols off the coast of northern Queensland, Australia.

On 7 February 1917 the Imperial Japanese Navy formed the First Special Squadron which composed the cruisers Yahagi, Tsushima, Suma and Niitaka, together with the Second Destroyer Flotilla. This squadron was based at Singapore and commanded by Rear Admiral Kozaburo Oguri. On 26 March 1917, the British Admiralty further requested the deployment of Chikuma and Hirado to Australia and New Zealand to protect shipping against German commerce raiding operations.

Yahagi and Suma were ordered to the Indian Ocean to continue cooperation with the British China Squadron, and Tsushima and Niitaka proceeded to Mauritius. Yahagi continued to patrol the eastern coasts of Australia and New Zealand from May to October 1917. Yahagi, the last ship deployed by Japan to defend Australia and New Zealand, sailed from Sydney back to Japan on 21 October 1918.

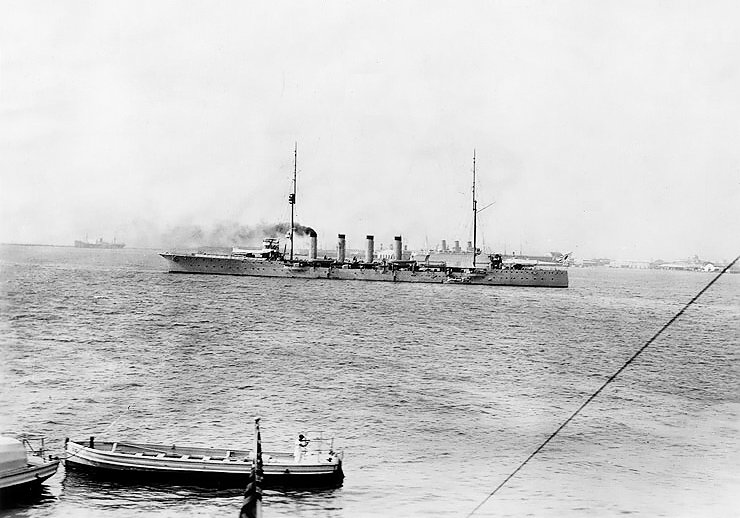
Yahagi from USS Black Hawk (AD-9) circa 1932, possibly in Manila Bay, Philippines

The crew of Yahagi became stricken with influenza during the Great Influenza Epidemic of December 1918, and had to make an emergency port call at Manila harbor for 46 days, during which time 300 of her crew were incapacitated, and 48 died. A memorial at the burial site in 1938 still stands in Valenzuela still stands today.

After the end of the war, Yahagi was assigned to patrol off the coast of eastern Russia to provide protection and support for supply convoys to Japanese ground forces in Siberia during Japan's Siberian Intervention against the Bolshevik Red Army.

Afterwards, Yahagi was mostly assigned to guarding the southern approaches to Japan, and made frequent port calls to Manila and Macau. From 1923 to 1937, Yahagi was used for patrols in the inland waters of China, replacing the cruiser Tone as a station ship on the Yangtze River.

After the start of the Second Sino-Japanese War in 1937, she was considered a reserve vessel and was used primarily as a moored training ship. Stricken from the navy list on 1 April 1940 and re-designated Hai Kan No.12 at the Etajima Imperial Japanese Naval Academy, she served as a barracks ship for submarine crews until 1943. The hulk was scrapped from 31 January 1947 to 8 July 1947.
