= Tenryū-class cruiser =

Class of Imperial Japanese Navy light cruisers

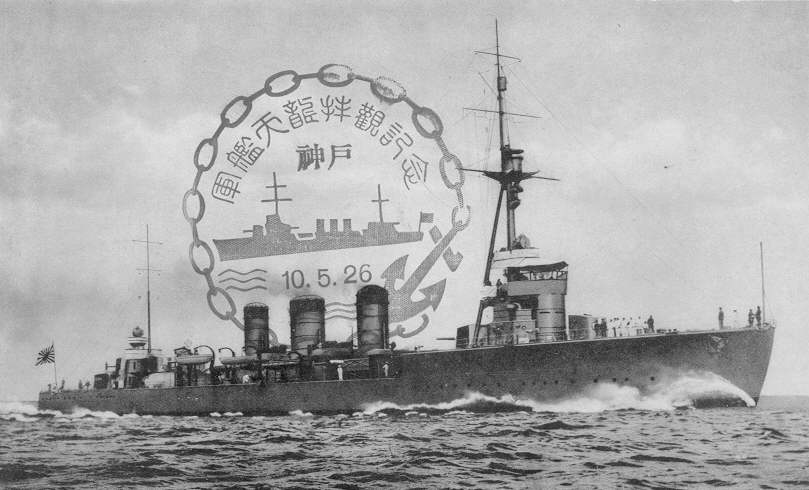
- Tenryū in 1921

Class overview
- Builders: Yokosuka Naval Arsenal; Sasebo Naval Arsenal
- Operators: Imperial Japanese Navy
- Preceded by: Chikuma class
- Succeeded by: Kuma class
- Built: 1917–1919
- In commission: 1919–1944
- Planned: 8
- Completed: 2
- Canceled: 6
- Lost: 2

General characteristics
- Type: Light cruiser
- Displacement: 3,948 long tons (4,011 t) standard; 4,350 long tons (4,420 t) full
- Length: 142.9 m (468 ft 10 in) o/a
- Beam: 12.3 m (40 ft 4 in)
- Draught: 4 m (13 ft 1 in)
- Installed power: 110kW 110V electrical
- Propulsion: 3 shaft Brown Curtis geared turbine engines; 10 Kampon boilers; 51,000 shp (38,000 kW); 920 tons oil, 150 tons coal
- Speed: 33 knots (38 mph; 61 km/h)
- Range: 5,000 nmi (9,300 km) @ 14 kn (16 mph; 26 km/h)
- Complement: 327
- Armament: July 1937 to November 1940; 4 × 14 cm/50 3rd Year Type naval guns (4x1); 1 × 8 cm/40 3rd Year Type naval gun (1x1); 2 × Type 93 13 mm AA machine guns (2x1); 6 × 533 mm (21.0 in) Type 6 torpedo tubes (2x3)
- Armour: Belt: 63 mm (2.5 in); Deck: 25 mm (1 in); Conning tower: 51 mm (2 in)

The two Tenryū-class cruisers (天龍型軽巡洋艦, Tenryū-gata keijun'yōkan) were the first light cruisers operated by the Imperial Japanese Navy. They participated in numerous actions during World War II.

The Tenryū class was followed by the larger and more versatile Kuma class.

== Background ==
The Tenryū class was designed to act as flagships for destroyer flotillas. The design represented an intermediate class between the light cruiser (e.g.Chikuma class of 5,000 t) and the destroyer (e.g. Kawakaze-class destroyers of 1,300 t), which had few counterparts in other navies of the time, although it was inspired by a similar concept to the Royal Navy Arethusa class and C-class cruisers. The Imperial Japanese Navy and Japanese shipbuilding industry were still closely associated with the British due to the Anglo-Japanese Alliance, and were able to improve on the British experience.

Plans for the small cruisers were developed in 1915, with orders placed in the 1916 fiscal year. The cost of construction was approximately 4.55 million yen.

Soon after completion, the drawbacks of the small design became apparent to the Imperial Japanese Navy General Staff. Newer Japanese destroyers, such as the Minekaze class had a design speed of 39 knots, much higher than that of the Tenryū. Newer American cruisers, such as the Omaha class also exceeded it in firepower. Plans for an additional six ships were later abandoned in favor of a series of medium-sized (5500 ton class) cruisers, based on an enlarged version of the Tenryū design. From 1935-1936, plans were considered to convert the class into a dedicated anti-aircraft / anti-submarine platforms, using eight 127 mm guns in dual turrets, eight 25-mm guns, and four depth charge launchers with 36 depth charges. The redesign would also have involved combining the smokestacks into a single stack. Funding was approved for fiscal 1937, but the plan was cancelled due to an overload in the capacity of Japanese shipyards. The plan was floated again in 1938-1939 using eight Type 98 76.2 mm guns, but eventually abandoned in favor of the Akizuki-class destroyers.

== Design ==
The Tenryū-class vessels, termed "small-model" (or "3,500-Ton") cruisers, were designed as fast flotilla leaders for the Imperial Navy's new first- and second-class destroyers. With improvements in oil-fired turbine engine technology and the use of Brown Curtiss geared turbine engines, the Tenryū class had more than twice the horsepower of the previous Chikuma class, and were capable of 33 knots (61 km/h). Three sets of turbines were used, with ten boilers fitted into three boiler rooms. Two of the boilers were mixed-firing, using a combination of oil and coal, but were converted to oil firing before the start of World War II.

However, in terms of weaponry, the Tenryū class was weaker than any other contemporary cruiser. The main battery for the Tenryū class consisted of four 14 cm/50 3rd Year Type naval guns, which were also utilized as the secondary battery on the Ise-class battleships. However, the guns were situated in single mounts on the centerline, with only a limited angle of fire, and could fire only one gun at a target immediately in front or aft of the vessel. Ammunition handling was entirely manual. There were 2 magazines at the lowest deck level (4 decks below the guns), one between mounts 1 and 2 below the bridge, one below mount 3, reachable by bucket chain hoists. Loading and training was all manual as well. A Type 13 fire-control director was mounted above the bridge and two 2.5m range finders were used, one mounted on the compass bridge, the other just ahead of gun mount 3.

A further weakness was the lack of room for anti-aircraft guns. Despite awareness increasing about the growing threat of aircraft to surface ships, the secondary battery of the Tenryū class consisted of only a single dual-purpose 8 cm/40 3rd Year Type naval gun, plus two 6.5 mm machine guns. The class also was the first to use triple torpedo launchers, with two centerline-mounted Type 6 21-inch launchers. No reloads were carried. The hull design resembled enlarged destroyers, with a high ratio of length to width (11.28:1) and a raised bow deck. The No.1 gun turret was situated on the foredeck, followed by a short three-story tower superstructure with the mast, and the No.2 gun turret to the rear. This was followed by a stepped hull, housing a triple torpedo launcher on the centerline, followed by a narrow amidships superstructure forming the base for three relatively low smokestacks. This was followed by the aft triple torpedo launcher and the No.3 and No.4 gun turrets. The armor protection for the hull was weak, designed primarily against the 102 mm weapons used on contemporary United States Navy destroyers.

=== In service modifications ===
In 1930 (Tenryū) and in 1933 (Tatsuta), the ships were renovated with a modified bow superstructure, replacing the canvas sides of the bridge with steel plate, and lowering the mast for increased stability. In 1936, the bridge was further reinforced with steel plate as protection against shrapnel. In July 1937, two Type 93 13 mm AA machine guns in single mounts were added on platforms near the first smokestack. These were replaced in 1940 with two twin-mount Type 96 25 mm AA guns; the 8 cm/40 3rd Year Type naval gun was removed at this time. Since both vessels were regarded as second-line units by the time of World War II, wartime modifications were minor. An additional two Type 96 25-mm twin mounts were added while at Truk in February 1942. Tatsuta received a fifth Type 96 twin mount in an August 1943 refit.

== Ships in Class ==
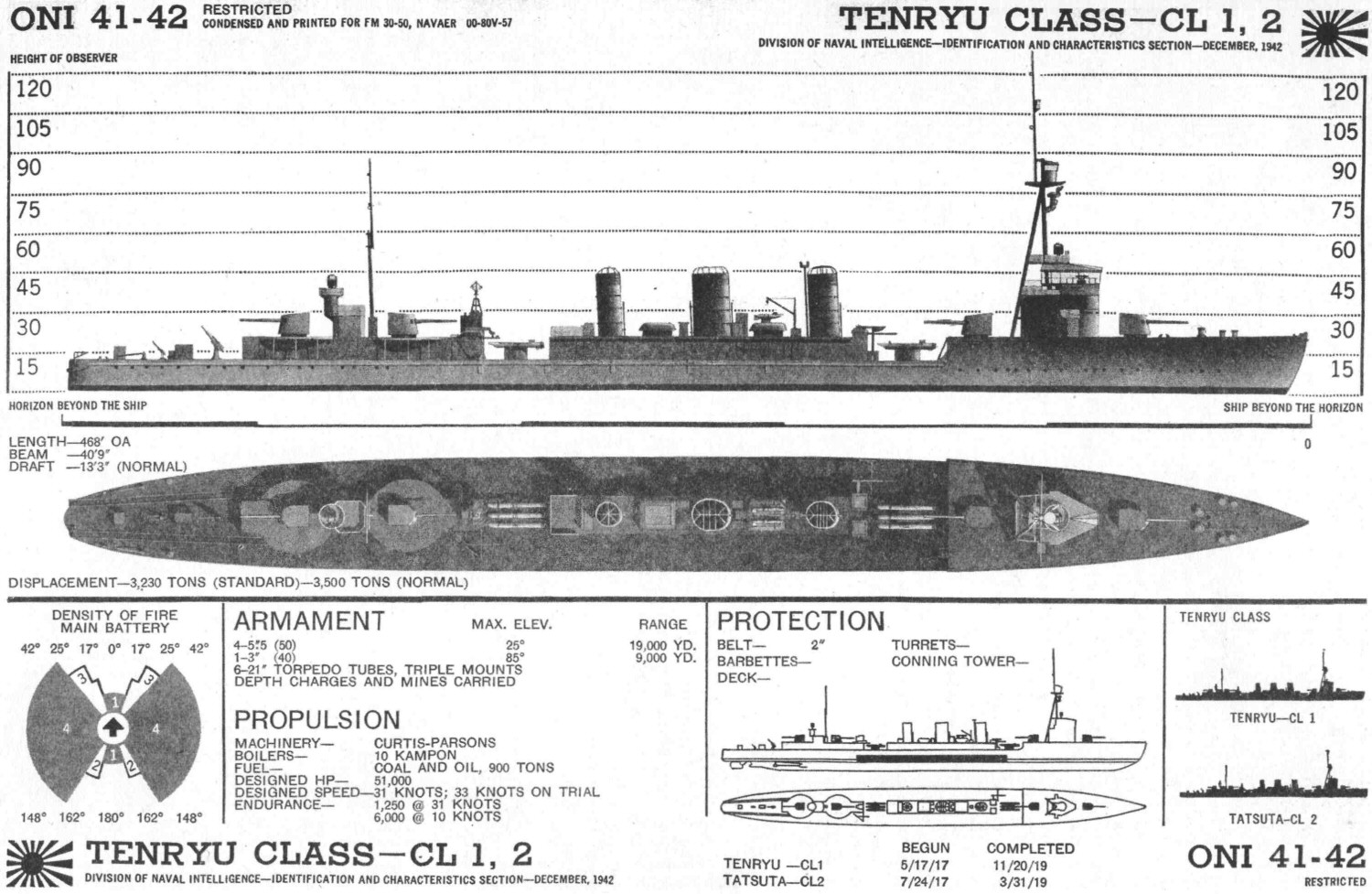
Office of Naval Intelligence Image of the Tenryū class

Two vessels were built in the Tenryū class, neither of which survived the Pacific War.

Tenryū (天龍)

Tenryū was laid down on 7 May 1917 and completed on 20 November 1919, at the Yokosuka Naval Arsenal. Prior to World War II, she participated in the Siberian Intervention, Yangtze River patrols and supported the landings of Japanese troops along the China coast. During the early stages of the Pacific War, she participated in the Battle of Wake Island and the invasions of the Solomon Islands, New Guinea, Tulagi, and the Battle of Savo Island. Two of her torpedoes are credited with sinking USS Quincy (CA-39). She participated in the Naval Battle of Guadalcanal, and was sunk by USS Albacore on 19 December 1942. She was struck on 20 January 1943.

Tatsuta (龍田)

Tatsuta was laid down on 24 July 1917 and completed at the Sasebo Naval Arsenal on 31 March 1919. Prior to World War II, she participated in the Siberian Intervention, and supported the landings of Japanese troops along the China coast. During the Pacific War, she participated in the Battle of Wake Island and the invasions of the Solomon Islands, New Guinea, Tulagi. She was retained in Japanese home waters for most of 1943 on training duties. She was sunk while bound for Saipan by USS Sand Lance, 40 nautical miles (74 km) NNE of Hachijōjima on 13 March 1944. Tatsuta was struck on 10 May 1944.
