= Chikuma-class cruiser =

Imperial Japanese Navy ship class

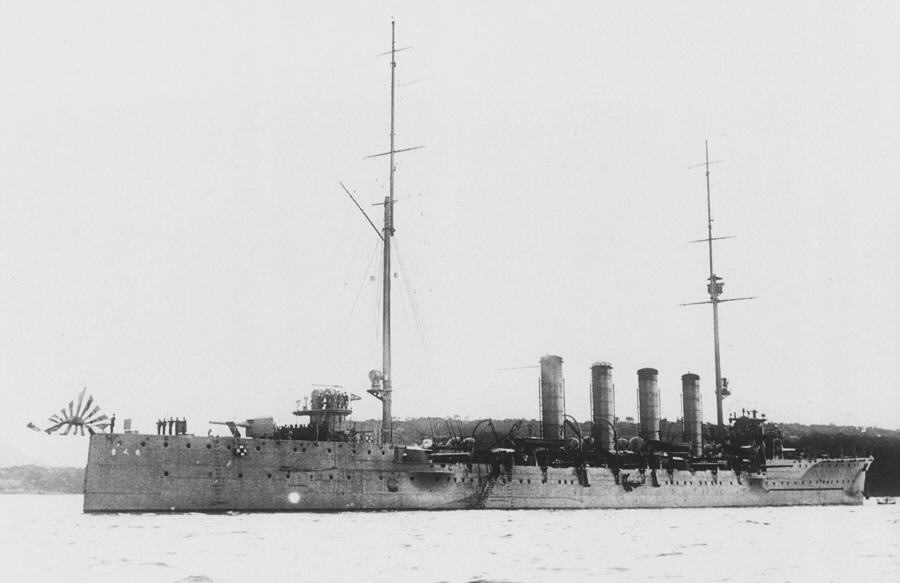
- Chikuma during commissioning, 1912

Class overview
- Name: Chikuma class
- Builders: Mitsubishi Shipyards; Sasebo Naval Arsenal; Kawasaki Dockyard
- Operators: Imperial Japanese Navy
- Preceded by: Yodo class
- Succeeded by: Tenryū class
- In commission: 1912–1940
- Completed: 3
- Retired: 3

General characteristics
- Type: Protected cruiser
- Displacement: 5,000 long tons (5,080 t)
- Length: 134.1 m (440 ft 0 in)
- Beam: 14.2 m (46 ft 7 in)
- Draught: 5.1 m (16 ft 9 in)
- Propulsion: Two shaft steam turbine engines; 16 Kampon boilers; 22,500 hp (16,800 kW)
- Speed: 26 knots (30 mph; 48 km/h)
- Range: 10,000 nmi (19,000 km) at 10 kn (12 mph; 19 km/h)
- Armament: 8 × Type 41 6-inch 45 caliber naval gun; 4 × QF 12 pounder 12 cwt naval guns; 2 × 7.7 mm Lewis Guns; 3 × 457 mm (18.0 in) torpedo tubes
- Armour: Deck: 22 mm (0.87 in) to 57 mm (2.2 in); Conning tower: 102 mm (4.0 in)

The three Chikuma-class cruisers (筑摩型防護巡洋艦, Chikuma-gata bōgojun'yōkan) were protected cruisers operated by the Imperial Japanese Navy. They participated in numerous actions during World War I.

The Chikuma class was the final class of protected cruiser in the Imperial Japanese Navy, and was followed by the Tenryū class of light cruisers.

== Background ==
The Chikuma-class protected cruisers were ordered as part of the 1907 Naval Expansion Program, based on lessons learned during the Russo-Japanese War. Along with the Kongō-class battlecruisers, the Chikuma class was the first phase of a project to build a high speed navy based on the latest naval technologies.

== Design ==
The basic design of the Chikuma-class cruisers was modeled after the Royal Navy Town class with some modifications and was also largely influenced by the design of the cruiser Tone. The silhouette of the Chikuma class was readily distinguishable due to its four smokestacks. Contrary to many popular publications, the protection of the Chikuma class was similar to the Tone class, and they remained protected cruisers, without an armoured belt.

The Chikuma-class cruisers were the first high-speed turbine-driven cruisers in the Imperial Japanese Navy, which gave them much greater speed than previous cruiser designs. Chikuma and Hirado used the newly developed Curtis turbines, which gave them a rated top speed of 26 knots (48 km/h; 30 mph). During speed trials, they achieved 26.83 and 26.87 knots respectively. Yahagi was built with a Parsons-type turbine engine, and achieved 27.14 knots during speed trials. Although the class achieved its target of high speed, the new technology of the engines, especially issues with material strength and fatigue, led to maintenance issues.

In terms of armaments, the Chikuma class was unique in its use of a single caliber main battery. The class was armed with eight Type 41 6-inch 45 caliber naval gun, one each fore and aft, and three mounted in sponsons on each side of the hull. These guns were supplemented by four QF 12-pounder 12 cwt naval guns and two Lewis guns. In addition, each vessel was equipped with three torpedo launchers with 457 mm (18 in) torpedoes.

After 1919, two 8 cm/40 3rd Year Type naval gun were added for anti-aircraft defense abeam of the fourth funnel, replacing two of the 12-pounders in Hirado and three of the 12-pounders in Yahagi and Chikuma.

== Ships in class ==
Three ships were budgeted for and completed under the 1907 Naval Expansion Program, one each from the Sasebo Naval Arsenal, Mitsubishi, Nagasaki and Kawasaki Shipbuilding, Kobe. All ships of the class served in World War I. Yahagi and Hirado served in the Second Sino-Japanese War and the first months of World War II, and were scrapped before the outbreak of the Pacific War.

=== Chikuma ===
Launched on 1 April 1911 and completed on 17 May 1912 by the Sasebo Naval Arsenal, Chikuma participated in various operations in World War I in the central and southern Pacific Ocean. The ship was stricken on 1 April 1931, and expended as a target in 1935.

=== Yahagi ===
Launched on 3 October 1911 and completed on 27 July 1912 by the Mitsubishi Nagasaki shipyards, Yahagi participated in various operations in World War I in the Pacific Ocean and Indian Ocean. The cruiser was later used during the Siberian Intervention and the opening stages of the Second Sino-Japanese War. The ship was stricken on 1 April 1940, its hulk serving as a barracks until 1943.

=== Hirado ===
Launched on 29 June 1911 and completed on 17 June 1912 by the Kawasaki Dockyard Company, Kobe Shipyards, Hirado participated in various operations in World War I in the central and southern Pacific Ocean. The cruiser was later used during the Siberian Intervention and the opening stages of the Second Sino-Japanese War. The ship was stricken on 1 April 1940, its hulk serving as a barracks until 1943.
