= USS Sand Lance (SS-381) =

Submarine of the United States

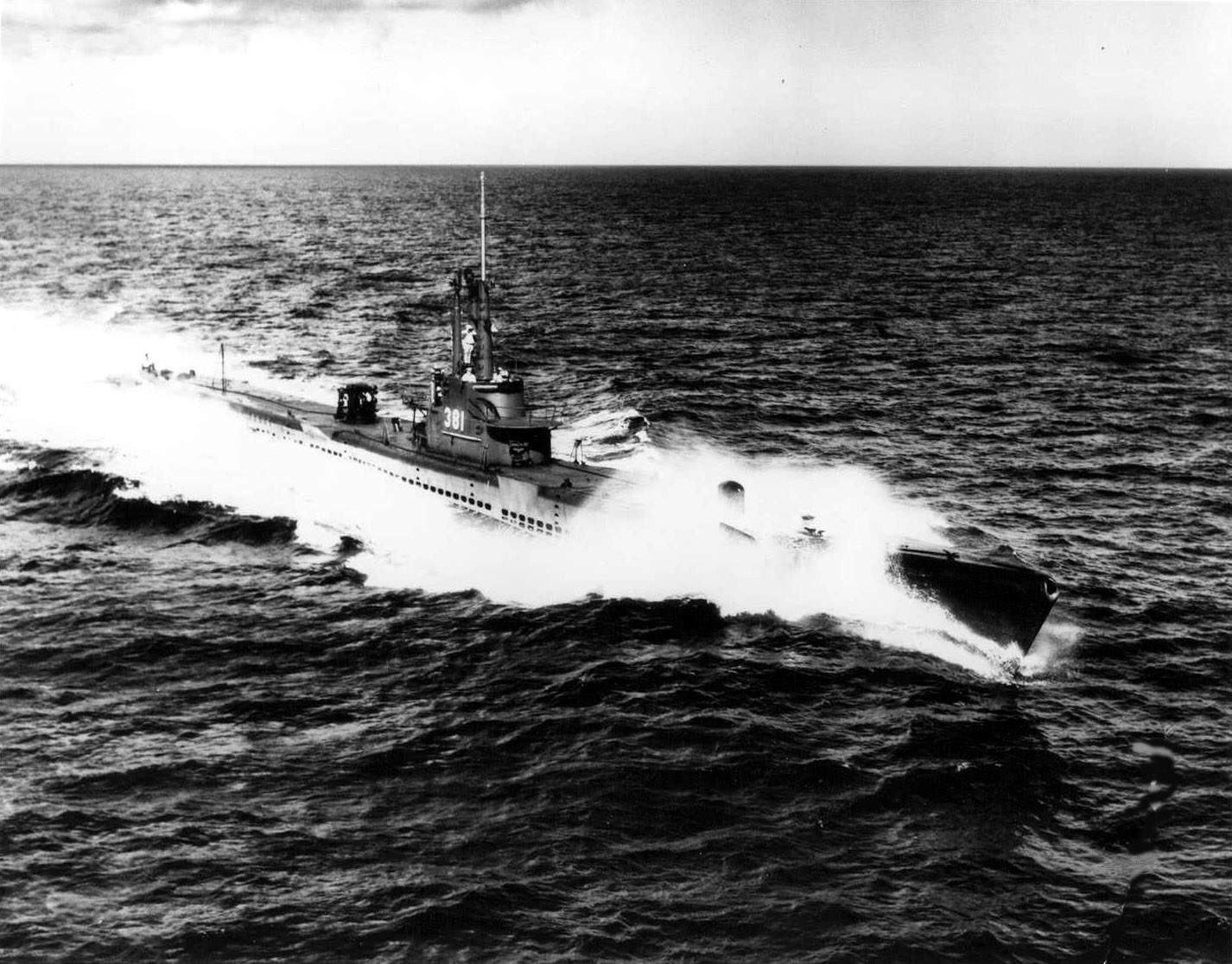
- USS Sand Lance (SS-381) running post-repair trials off Oahu, Hawaii, on 15 August 1963

History

United States
- Name: USS Sand Lance (SS-381)
- Namesake: Sand lance
- Builder: Portsmouth Naval Shipyard, Kittery, Maine
- Laid down: 12 March 1943
- Launched: 25 June 1943
- Sponsored by: Mrs. Edith Burrows
- Commissioned: 9 October 1943
- Decommissioned: 14 February 1946
- Recommissioned: 6 April 1963
- Decommissioned: 7 September 1963
- Stricken: 1 September 1972
- Fate: Transferred to Brazil 7 September 1963

Brazil
- Name: Rio Grande do Sul (S-11)
- Namesake: Rio Grande do Sul
- Acquired: 7 September 1963
- Stricken: 15 September 1972
- Fate: Cannibalized for spare parts

General characteristics
- Class & type: Balao-class diesel-electric submarine
- Displacement: 1,526 long tons (1,550 t) surfaced; 2,391 long tons (2,429 t) submerged
- Length: 311 ft 6 in (94.95 m)
- Beam: 27 ft 3 in (8.31 m)
- Draft: 16 ft 10 in (5.13 m) maximum
- Propulsion: 4 × Fairbanks-Morse Model 38D8-⅛ 10-cylinder opposed piston diesel engines driving electrical generators; 2 × 126-cell Sargo batteries; 4 × high-speed Elliott electric motors with reduction gears; two propellers; 5,400 shp (4.0 MW) surfaced; 2,740 shp (2.0 MW) submerged
- Speed: 20.25 knots (37.50 km/h) surfaced; 8.75 knots (16.21 km/h) submerged
- Range: 11,000 nautical miles (20,000 km) surfaced at 10 knots (19 km/h)
- Endurance: 48 hours at 2 knots (3.7 km/h) submerged; 75 days on patrol
- Test depth: 400 feet (120 m)
- Complement: 10 officers, 70–71 enlisted
- Armament: 10 × 21-inch (533 mm) torpedo tubes; 6 forward, 4 aft; 24 torpedoes; 1 × 5-inch (127 mm) / 25 caliber deck gun; Bofors 40 mm and Oerlikon 20 mm cannon

USS Sand Lance (SS-381), a Balao-class submarine, was the first ship of the United States Navy to be named for the sand lance, a member of the family Ammodytidae.

== Construction and commissioning ==
Sand Lance′s keel was laid down on 12 March 1943 by the Portsmouth Navy Yard in Kittery, Maine. She was launched on 25 June 1943, sponsored by Mrs. Edith Burrows, and commissioned on 9 October 1943 at Portsmouth, New Hampshire.

== Service history ==
=== U.S. Navy ===
==== World War II ====
Sand Lance conducted training exercises from New London, Connecticut, until 18 December 1943 when she sailed for the Panama Canal. She transited the canal on 30 December and reached her base of operations, Pearl Harbor, Hawaii, on 17 January 1944.

===== First war patrol =====
On 8 February, Sand Lance got underway for the first of her five war patrols. She stopped at Midway Atoll in the Northwestern Hawaiian Islands for fuel, then headed for the Kuril Islands. Before entering her patrol area off Paramushiro on 24 February, she passed through two typhoons and encountered fields of slush ice and patches of drift ice. Sand Lance encountered her first victim, the Japanese cargo ship Kaika Maru, taking shelter from a blizzard in the lee of Paramushiro's southeast point and torpedoed and sank her. Though her Number One periscope had been heavily damaged by drift ice, she pressed home attacks on a convoy on the night of 2 March and 3 March, sinking the 4521-ton cargo ship Akashisan Maru, and damaging other ships. On 3 March 1944, Sand Lance mistakenly sank the Soviet merchant ship Byelorussia in the Sea of Okhotsk.

On the night of 12–13 March, Sand Lance was running on the surface toward Honshū when a marauding airplane forced her to submerge. At about 0200, she came up to periscope depth and found herself in the midst of a Japanese convoy, consisting of five merchantmen and three heavily armed warships. Sand Lance had only six torpedoes remaining, but she made them count. She loosed four from the stern tubes and two from the bow tubes. All six hit the mark. Two of the four stern torpedoes hit a merchantman and the other two ripped into a light cruiser, while the two from the bow tubes smashed into another freighter. At least two of the ships went to the bottom, light cruiser Tatsuta and cargoman Kokuyo Maru, carrying over 1,000 enemy troops. For her success, Sand Lance underwent a 16-hour, 100-depth charge pounding from the accompanying destroyers. Finally, she was able to head home. She arrived in Pearl Harbor on 23 April 1944. The successes of her maiden war patrol brought Sand Lance a Presidential Unit Citation.

===== Second war patrol =====
Sand Lance spent her second war patrol in the vicinity of the Marianas Islands and terminated it on the eve of the American invasion of those islands. She contributed to the success of that campaign by depriving the defending Japanese of the war material carried by five ships. On 3 May 1944, just north of Saipan, she torpedoed and sank the 3129-ton cargo ship Kenan Maru. Eight days later, she damaged Mitakesan Maru, a 4441-ton passenger cargo ship, while evading the bombs from an attacking enemy plane. Sand Lance sent the 4291-ton freighter Koho Maru to the bottom on 14 May off Apra Harbor, Guam, and found two more targets off Saipan on 17 May. This last attack, the sinking of Taikoku Maru and Fukko Maru, exhausted her supply of torpedoes, and she headed south to Fremantle, Australia, arriving on 5 June 1944.

===== Third war patrol =====
Sand Lance put to sea on 3 July to patrol the Molucca Sea and Celebes Sea. She sank the converted gunboat Taiko Maru on 14 July and damaged another ship in the same attack. Four days later, she received a good shaking from fast patrol craft while trying to press an attack on a large transport in the Sulu Islands. Sand Lance did not find another target until 1 August when she damaged a freighter south of Lombok Island. Two days later, she barely escaped the bombs of a plane which almost caught her in the shallow waters of Amoesang Bay. She sped back through the entrance to the bay and the safety of deeper water.

More bombs exploded astern on the morning of 6 August as she stalked some small freighters along the coast of Celebes. The force of the explosion lifted her several feet and damaged her port shaft.

Soon, Sand Lance had two additional problems, enemy escorts bearing down on her and a torpedo running hot in one of her stern tubes. Sand Lance came up to 100 feet (30 m) and fired the torpedo. Eight seconds later, it exploded prematurely, adding to the damage to her stern. Fortunately, the explosion apparently convinced the Japanese that they had destroyed the submarine, for Sand Lance received no further attacks. She surfaced after dark, but the damaged gear could not be repaired. Forced to make the voyage back to Fremantle on one shaft, she made port on 19 August. On 10 September, she headed east for Pearl Harbor and, from there, on to Mare Island Naval Shipyard, where she arrived on 1 November.

===== Fourth & fifth war patrols =====
Repairs were completed by 13 March 1945 when she sailed back to Pearl Harbor. On her fourth war patrol from 10 April to 6 June 1945, Sand Lance encountered only one target, an unidentified coastal freighter which she torpedoed on 14 May. She departed from her patrol area, along the coasts of Honshū and Hokkaidō, and returned to Midway Island on 6 June. One month later, she sailed from Midway on her fifth and last war patrol. She fueled at Saipan, then took up lifeguard station for the bombers raiding the Japanese home islands. Hostilities ceased on 15 August, and, on the next day Sand Lance made for San Francisco, California, via Midway and Pearl Harbor. She entered the San Francisco Naval Shipyard at Hunter's Point on 7 September for inactivation overhaul. Sand Lance decommissioned at San Francisco on 14 February 1946.

==== Post-World War II ====
Sand Lance remained inactive until designated for loan to the Brazilian Navy under the terms of the Military Assistance Program. After reconditioning, she recommissioned at Pearl Harbor on 6 April 1963. She departed Pearl Harbor on 24 June and made San Francisco on 1 July to embark officers and men of the Brazilian Navy for training. The training was completed by 7 September 1963 when she was decommissioned and loaned to Brazil.

=== Brazilian Navy ===
On transfer she was renamed Rio Grande do Sul (S-11) (variously misspelled in American records as "...de Sol," "...del Sol," &c.) and served for eight years in the Brazilian Navy.

== Retirement and disposal ==
On 15 September 1972, Brazil returned her (at least on paper), and promptly purchased her back for US$55,000 on 12 October. Upon that purchase, Sand Lance was struck from the Naval Vessel Register.

Brazil cannibalized the submarine for parts and within three years the boat was reduced to scrap.

== Honors and awards ==
Sand Lance (SS-381) earned five battle stars and a Presidential Unit Citation for World War II service.

- Presidential Unit Citation
