= Japanese cruiser Tone (1907) =

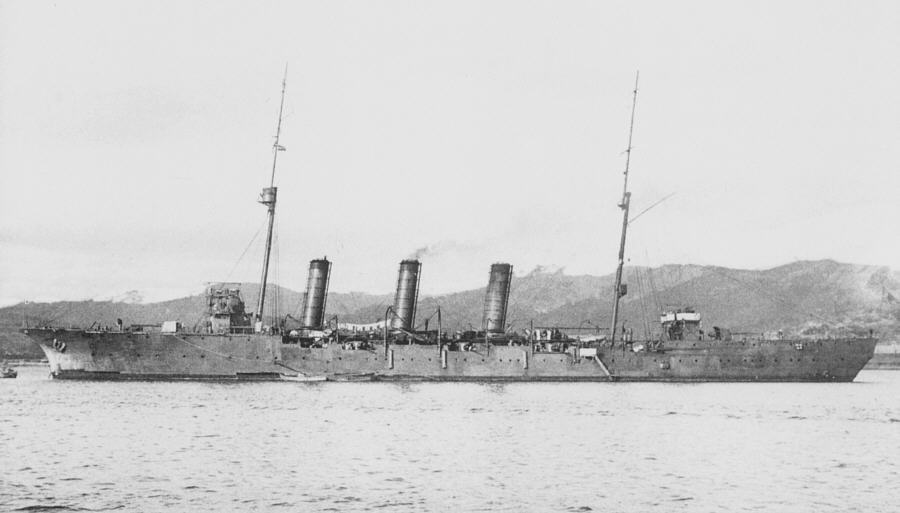
- Tone in 1918

History

Empire of Japan
- Name: Tone
- Ordered: 1904 Fiscal Year
- Builder: Sasebo Naval Arsenal
- Laid down: 17 November 1905
- Launched: 24 October 1907
- Completed: 5 May 1910
- Stricken: 1 April 1931
- Fate: Expended as target, 30 April 1933

General characteristics
- Type: Protected cruiser
- Displacement: 4,113 long tons (4,179 t) normal; 4,900 long tons (4,979 t) maximum
- Length: 113.8 m (373 ft 4 in) w/l
- Beam: 14.4 m (47 ft 3 in)
- Draught: 5.1 m (16 ft 9 in)
- Propulsion: 2-shaft reciprocating VTE engines; 16 boilers; 15,500 hp (11,600 kW); 900 tons coal, 124 tons oil
- Speed: 23 knots (26 mph; 43 km/h)
- Range: 7,340 nmi (13,590 km) at 10 kn (12 mph; 19 km/h)
- Complement: 370
- Armament: 2 × QF 6-inch naval guns; 10 × QF 4.7 inch Gun Mk I–IVs; 4 × QF 12-pounder 12 cwt naval guns; 3 × 457 mm (18.0 in) torpedo tubes
- Armour: Deck: 67 mm (2.6 in); Conning tower: 100 mm (3.9 in)

Tone (利根, Innate Aptitude) was a protected cruiser of the Imperial Japanese Navy. The ship was named after the Tone River in Tokyo.

== Background ==
Tone was designed and built in Japan by the Sasebo Naval Arsenal, under the 1904 Emergency Fleet Replenishment Program to recover from losses to the Japanese navy in the Russo-Japanese War. As funding was limited, the Diet of Japan rejected budgeting for a sister ship or for subsequent construction of the same design.

== Design ==
Plan and profile drawing of Tone

Although dimensionally similar to the British-built Yoshino, Tone had the raked funnels and clipper bow that would be a feature of future Japanese warships.

Her powerplant consisted of two Mitsubishi vertical 4-cylinder triple-expansion steam engines with 16 Miyabara boilers, driving two screws. The boilers could run on a mixed-mode of coal sprayed with oil, and could drive the ship at a maximum speed of 23 knots (43 km/h; 26 mph), with an endurance of 7,400 nautical miles (13,700 km; 8,500 mi) at 10 knots (19 km/h; 12 mph). Tone was the last ship in the Imperial Japanese Navy to be powered by a reciprocating engine.

Her main armament consisted of two Type 41 6-inch/45 caliber naval guns behind gun shields, and secondary armament was twelve QF 4.7-inch guns and four QF 12-pounder 12 cwt naval guns. Tone also had three deck-mounted 457 mm (18 in) torpedo tubes. However, the foremost of the 4.7-inch secondary guns were located in a cramped location with a very limited field of fire, and were soon removed and not replaced. After World War I, two 76 mm (3 in) anti-aircraft guns were added just aft of the first smokestack.

Tone utilized Krupp armor with a thickness of 38–76 mm (1.5–3.0 in) on the decks, and 102 mm (4.0 in) on the conning tower. The design did not incorporate any side armor.

Tone was laid down on 27 November 1905 at the Sasebo Naval Arsenal, launched on 24 October 1907, and completed on 15 May 1910.

== Service record ==
Soon after completion, from 1 April 1911 to 12 November 1911, Tone was sent as part of the official Japanese naval delegation to Great Britain, as part of the coronation celebration for King George V together with the cruiser Kurama.

In World War I, Tone was assigned to the Japanese 2nd Fleet, and fought in the Battle of Tsingtao against the Imperial German Navy. Afterwards, she was reassigned to the Japanese Third Fleet, and was based out of Singapore, from whence she patrolled the sea lanes in the Indian Ocean and also occasionally in the Dutch East Indies against German commerce raiders and U-boats, as part of Japan's contribution to the Allied war effort under the Anglo-Japanese Alliance .

Between 1924 and 1929, Tone served as a station ship on the Yangtze River around Shanghai, China. She was transferred to the reserves at Sasebo Naval District on 30 November 1929.

Stricken from the navy list on 1 April 1931, and renamed Haikan No 2, the ship was expended as an aircraft target off Amami Ōshima on 30 April 1933.
