= 8 cm/40 3rd Year Type naval gun =

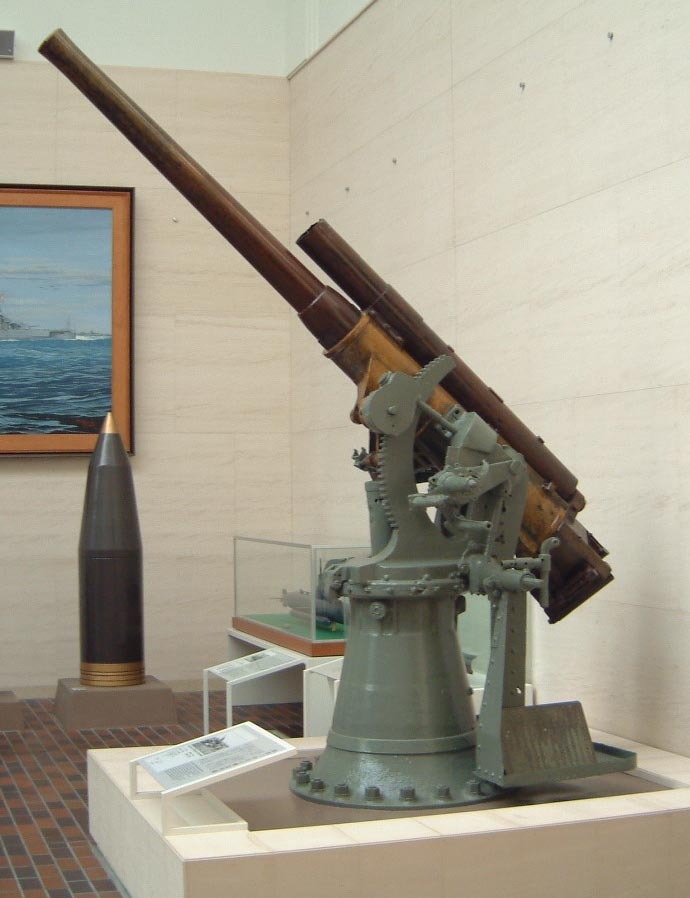
- A 8 cm/40 3rd Year Type naval gun at the Yasukuni Shrine.
- Type: Naval gun
- Place of origin: Empire of Japan

Service history
- In service: 1897–1945
- Used by: See § Users
- Wars: World War I World War II

Production history
- Designed: 1893
- Variants: 8 cm/40 (3") 11th Year Type; 8 cm/40 (3") Type 88; 8 cm/25 (3") Type 41

Specifications
- Mass: 2,401 kg (5,293 lb)
- Barrel length: 3.2 m (10 ft 6 in) L/40
- Shell: Fixed Quick Fire 76.2 x 405R ammunition
- Shell weight: 5.7–6 kg (12 lb 9 oz – 13 lb 4 oz)
- Caliber: 76.2 mm (3 in)
- Breech: Sliding block breech
- Recoil: Hydro-pneumatic
- Carriage: High/Low Angle
- Elevation: -5° to +75°
- Traverse: 360°
- Rate of fire: 13–20 rounds per minute
- Muzzle velocity: 670–685 m/s (2,200–2,250 ft/s)
- Effective firing range: 5.4 km (18,000 ft) (ceiling) at +75°
- Maximum firing range: 10,800 m (11,800 yd) at +45°
- Feed system: Manual

8 cm/25 Type 41 naval gun
- Type: Naval gun
Further information
Place of origin	Japan
Service history
In service	1915–1945
Used by	Imperial Japanese Navy
Wars	World War I World War II
Production history
Designed	1902
Specifications
Mass	316 kg (697 lb)
Barrel length	1.87 m (6 ft 2 in) L/25
Shell	Fixed Quick Fire
Shell weight	5.7–6 kg (12 lb 9 oz – 13 lb 4 oz)
Caliber	76.2 mm (3 in)
Traverse	360°
Rate of fire	15 rounds per minute
Muzzle velocity	450 m/s (1,500 ft/s)
Feed system	Manual

The Type 41 3-inch (76 mm) naval gun otherwise known as the 8 cm/40 3rd Year Type naval gun was a Japanese dual-purpose gun introduced before World War I. Although designated as 8 cm (3.15 in), its shells were 76.2 mm (3 in) in diameter.

== Design ==
The Japanese Type 41 3-inch (76 mm) naval gun otherwise known as the 8 cm/40 3rd Year Type naval gun was a direct copy of the English QF 12-pounder 12 cwt naval gun. The original 12-pounders were built-up guns with a single-motion interrupted screw breech that fired Fixed Quick Fire ammunition and had bottom mounted hydro-pneumatic recoil systems.

Many were mounted on low-angle pedestal mounts in casemates as the standard anti-torpedo boat gun on Japanese warships built between 1890 and 1920. Later guns changed to an autofretted monoblock barrel, taller pedestal mount for increased angles of elevation -5° to +75°, top mounted recoil system, and 45° sliding block breech. The guns fired a 5.7–6 kg (12 lb 9 oz – 13 lb 4 oz) high-explosive projectile.

After 1915 the guns were mounted on high/low angle mounts to serve as dual-purpose guns on most ships of the Imperial Japanese Navy and was still in service as late as the Pacific War as an anti-aircraft, coastal defense, and submarine deck gun.

== Variants ==
- 8 cm/40 (3") 11th Year Type (Model 1922) – Anti-aircraft gun.
- 8 cm/40 (3") Type 88 (Model 1928) – Submarine deck gun.
- 8 cm/25 (3") Type 41 – This was a related gun with a shorter barrel. There were three sub-variants each with slightly different barrel lengths. Length varied from 23 to 25 calibers depending on whether the length was measured from breech to muzzle or just the rifling was measured. This short gun was often used on smaller auxiliaries and submarines as a dual-purpose gun.

== History ==
The first guns were bought from the English firms as "Elswick Pattern N" and "Vickers Mark Z" guns. The gun was officially designated as the Type 41 3-inch (76 mm) naval gun from the 41st year of the reign of Emperor Meiji on 25 December 1908. Thereafter production was in Japan under license. On 5 October 1917 during the third year of the Taishō period, the gun was redesignated as the 8 cm/40 3rd Year Type naval gun as part of the Imperial Japanese Navy's conversion to the metric system. Although classified as an 8 cm gun the bore was unchanged.

The 8 cm/40 3rd Year Type was also widely used as a coastal defense gun and anti-aircraft gun to defend Japanese island bases during World War II. Guns with both English and Japanese markings were found on Kiska, Kolombangara, Saipan, Tarawa, and Tinian. Japanese Artillery Weapons CINPAC-CINPOA Bulletin 152-45 calls the guns "8 cm Coast Defense Gun 13th Year Type (1924)" but it isn't clear how they came up with that designation.

It was deployed aboard armed merchantmen, battleships, cruisers, gunboats, minelayers, minesweepers, and submarines of the Imperial Japanese Navy, including:

- Akagi Maru-class armed merchantmen
- Asama-class cruiser
- Chikuma-class cruiser
- Furutaka-class cruiser
- Fusō-class battleship
- Hashima-class cable layer
- Hatsutaka-class minelayer
- Ise-class battleship
- Izumo-class cruiser
- Japanese Type L submarine
- Jingei-class submarine tender
- Kaichū type submarine
- Kaidai-type submarine
- Kamikawa Maru-class seaplane tender
- Kinesaki-class food supply ship
- Kongō-class battlecruiser
- Kuma-class cruiser
- Muroto-class collier
- Nagara-class cruiser
- Nagato-class battleship
- No.1-class auxiliary minelayer
- No.1-class auxiliary minesweeper
- No.101-class landing ship
- No.13-class submarine chaser
- Notoro-class oiler
- Ondo-class oiler
- Ro-100-class submarine
- Sendai-class cruiser
- Seta-class gunboat
- Sokuten-class auxiliary minelayer (1913)
- Sokuten-class minelayer (1938)
- Tenryū-class cruiser
- Tosa-class battleship
- Tsubame-class minelayer
- Tsukuba-class cruiser
- W-1-class minesweeper

== Users ==
- Imperial Japanese Navy
- Republic of China Navy − Ning Hai-class cruisers
- Royal Thai Navy − Thonburi-class coastal defence ships
- Royal Romanian Navy − Two guns were acquired by Romania at some point before the start of World War II. They formed a section of coastal anti-aircraft artillery at the mouth of the Sfântu Gheorghe branch of the Danube Delta. The section was named Lăstunul.

== Gallery ==
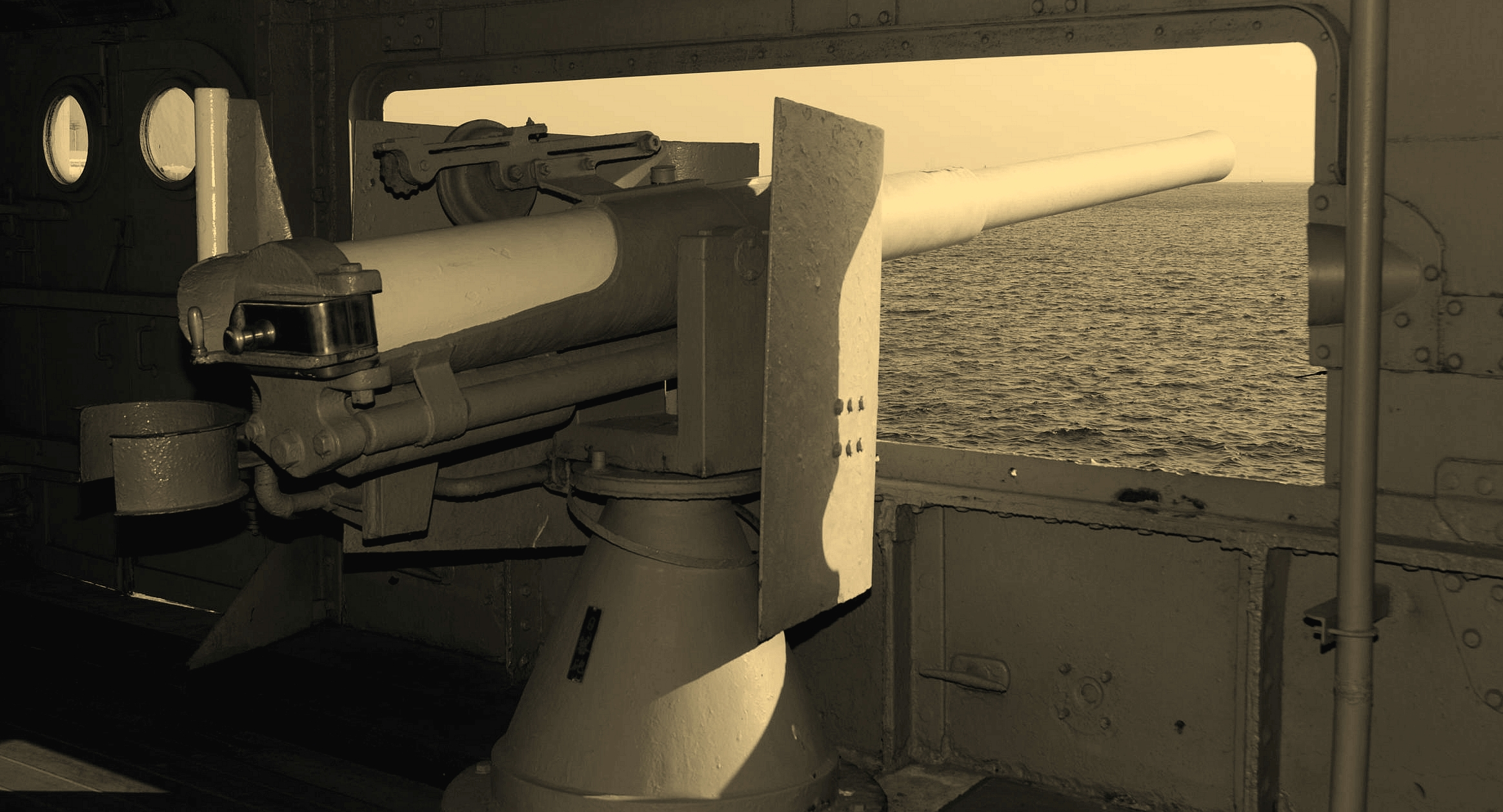
A 12-pounder aboard the Japanese Battleship Mikasa.

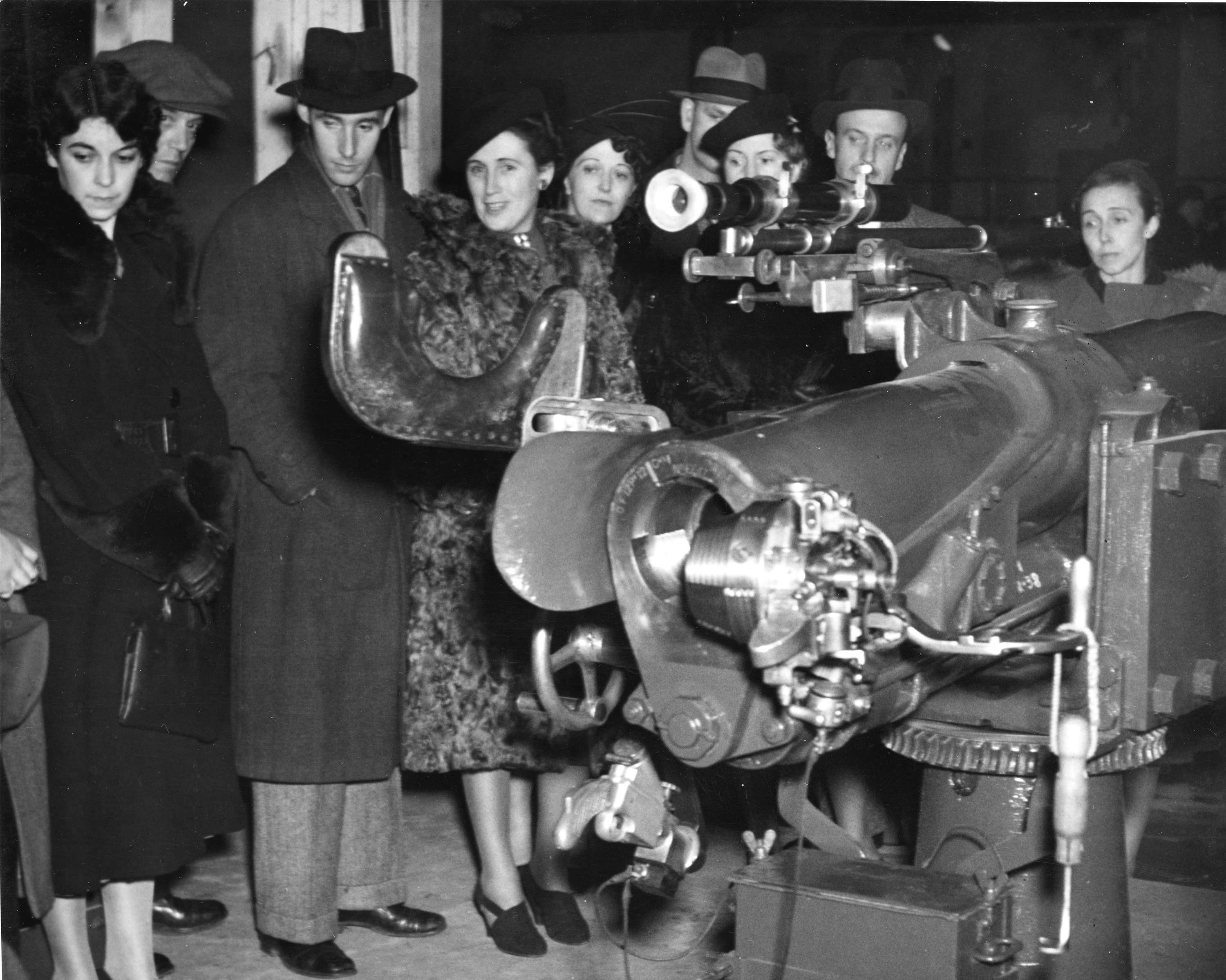
A 12-pounder showing its single-motion interrupted screw breech and bottom mounted recoil system.

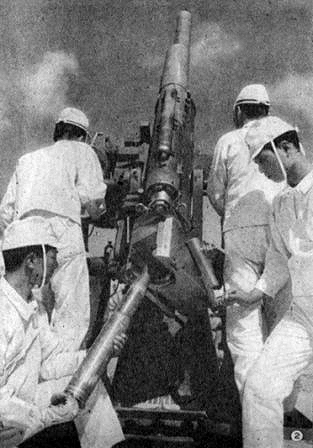
A Japanese 3rd year type showing its 45° sliding block breech and its top mounted recoil system.

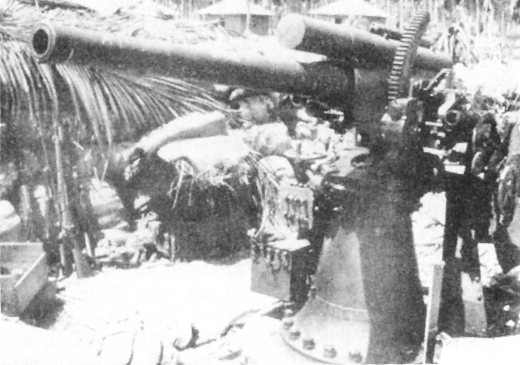
A 8cm/40 3rd Year Type gun captured at Guadalcanal.

== Bibliography ==
- Campbell, John (1985). Naval Weapons of World War Two. Annapolis, Maryland: Naval Institute Press. ISBN 0-87021-459-4.
- Friedman, Norman (2011). Naval Weapons of World War One: Guns, Torpedoes, Mines and ASW Weapons of All Nations; An Illustrated Directory. Barnsley, UK: Seaforth Publishing. ISBN 978-1-84832-100-7.
- This page incorporates material from Japanese Wikipedia page ja:四十口径三年式八糎高角砲, accessed 22 January 2016
