= Japanese cruiser Kashima =

Katori-class cruiser (1940–1945)

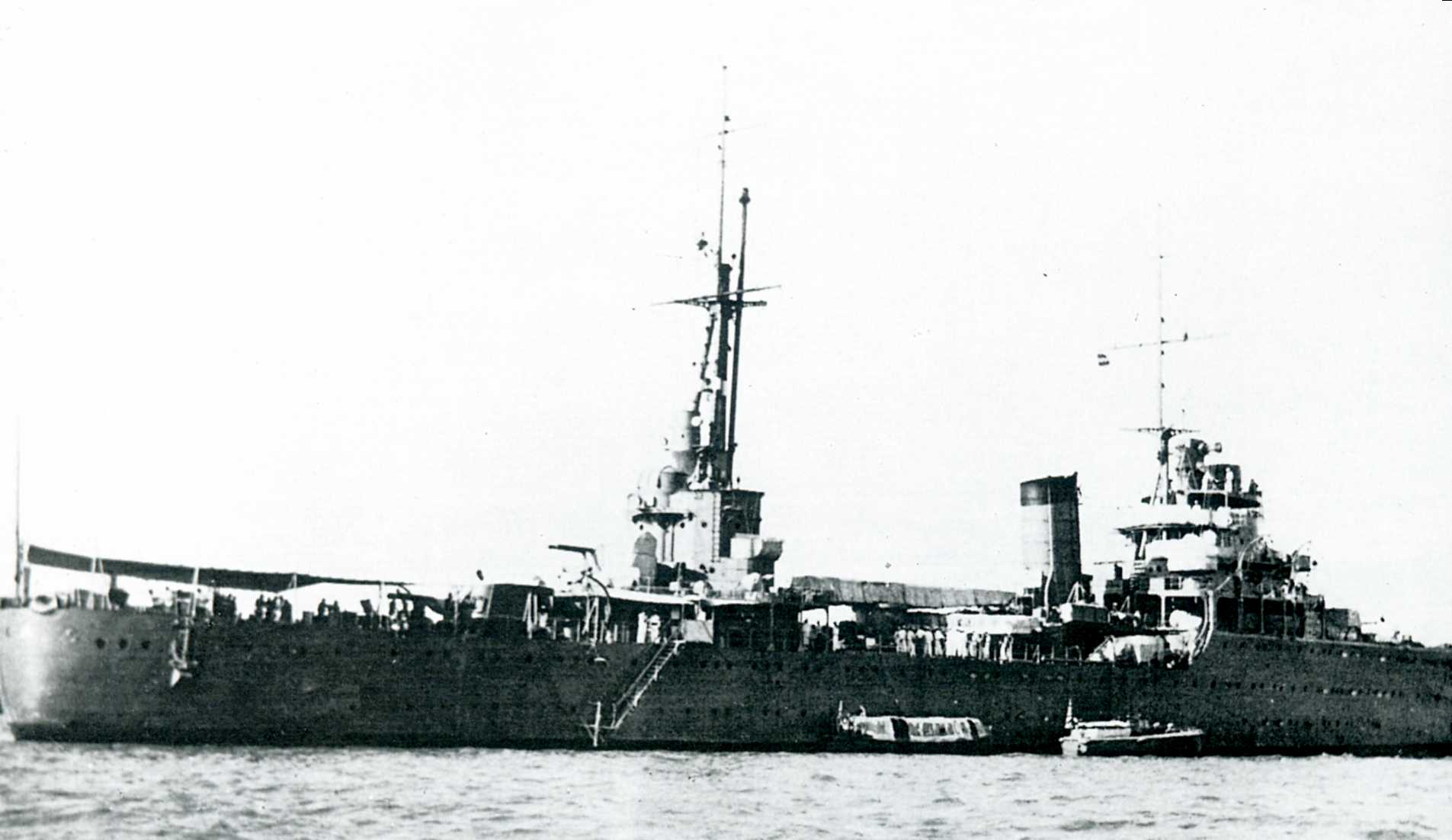
- Kashima in Shanghai, 1940

History

Empire of Japan
- Name: Kashima
- Ordered: 1938 Fiscal Year
- Builder: Mitsubishi
- Laid down: 6 October 1938
- Launched: 25 September 1939
- Commissioned: 31 May 1940
- Stricken: 5 October 1945
- Fate: Scrapped 1947

General characteristics
- Class & type: Katori-class cruiser
- Displacement: 5,890 long tons (5,985 t) normal; 6,180 long tons (6,279 t) full load
- Length: 129.77 m (425 ft 9 in)
- Beam: 15.95 m (52 ft 4 in)
- Draught: 5.75 m (18 ft 10 in)
- Propulsion: 2-shaft geared turbines, plus diesel motors; 3 Kampon boilers; 8,000 shp (6,000 kW)
- Speed: 18 knots (21 mph; 33 km/h)
- Range: 9,000 nautical miles (17,000 km) at 10 knots (19 km/h)
- Complement: 315 + 275 midshipmen
- Armament: 4 × 140 mm (5.5 in)/50 cal. guns (2×2); 2 × 127 mm (5 in)/40 cal. AA guns (1×2); 4 × Type 96 AA guns (later increased to 30); 8 × 13.2 mm (0.52 in) AA guns; 4 × 533 mm (21 in) torpedo tubes (2×2)
- Aircraft carried: 1 × floatplane
- Aviation facilities: 1 catapult

Kashima (鹿島 練習巡洋艦, Kashima renshūjunyōkan) was the second vessel completed of the three light cruisers in the Katori class, which served with the Imperial Japanese Navy during World War II. The ship was named after the noted Shinto shrine Kashima Jingu in Ibaraki prefecture, Japan.

== Background ==
The Katori-class cruisers were originally ordered to serve as training ships in the 1937 and 1939 Supplementary Naval Budget. With the Pacific War, they were used as administrative flagships for various fleets, such as submarine command and control and to command escort squadrons. The ships were upgraded as the war progressed with additional anti-aircraft guns and depth charges.

== Service career ==
=== Early career ===
Kashima was completed at the Mitsubishi Yokohama shipyards on 31 May 1940 and was initially based at Kure Naval Base in the Inland Sea.

On 28 July 1940, Kashima and its sister ship Katori participated in the last pre-war midshipman cruise visiting Etajima, Ominato, Dairen, Port Arthur and Shanghai. Soon after its return to Japan, Kashima was reassigned to the Japanese Fourth Fleet as flagship for CruDiv 18. On 1 December 1941, Kashima became flagship for Vice Admiral Shigeyoshi Inoue's Fourth Fleet based at Truk in the Caroline Islands. At the time of the Pearl Harbor attack, Kashima was at Truk.

=== Early stages of the Pacific War ===
During "Operation R" (the invasions of Rabaul and Kavieng), which took place from 23–24 January 1942, Kashima sortied from Truk to cover the landings of Japanese troops. Kashima later (20 February 1942) sortied from Truk in an unsuccessful pursuit of the aircraft carrier USS Lexington and American Task Force 11.

On 4 May 1942, during "Operation MO" (the invasions of Tulagi and Port Moresby), Kashima arrived at Rabaul, New Britain to direct operations, and was thus absent at the Battle of the Coral Sea, which occurred around the same time. After the successful landings of Japanese forces on New Guinea, Kashima returned to its base at Truk.

In July 1942, Kashima returned briefly to Kure for upgrading with two twin Type 96 25 mm AA guns, which were fitted in the forward part of the bridge. It then returned to Truk on 3 September 1942, where it continued to be based.

On 8 October 1942, a conference was held aboard Kashima to discuss the construction of defenses in the Pacific. The conference was attended by Rear Admiral Matome Ugaki Chief of Staff, Combined Fleet, and Imperial Japanese Army officials of the Defense Construction Department.

Later that month, on 26 October 1942 Vice Admiral Baron Tomoshige Samejima assumed command of the Fourth Fleet. He was replaced on 1 April 1943 by Vice Admiral Masami Kobayashi. During this time, Kashima was assigned to guard duty at Truk, with an occasional cruise around the Marshall Islands, or occasional return to Kure or Yokosuka for maintenance.

On 1 November 1943, Kashima was relieved as flagship of the Fourth Fleet by the light cruiser Nagara and was reassigned back to the Kure Training Division. On 18 November 1943, Kashima departed Truk with the submarine tender Chōgei escorted by destroyers Wakatsuki and Yamagumo. Shortly after departing Truk, the group was attacked by the submarine USS Sculpin, which the Kashima group managed to sink without Japanese casualties. Kashima arrived at Kure on 25 November 1943, and was in dry-dock until 12 January 1944.

From 23 January - 15 April 1944, Kashima resumed its original role as a training ship for the Imperial Japanese Naval Academy at Etajima, and it made numerous cruises in the Inland Sea.

=== Later stages of the Pacific War ===
However, as the war situation continued to deteriorate for Japan, Kashima was pressed into service as a transport. From 26 May 1944 to 11 July 1944, it made four runs from Shimonoseki to Okinawa carrying army reinforcements and supplies. Likewise, from 11 July 1944 in "Operation Ro-Go", Kashima was assigned to transport personnel and supplies to Taiwan, making numerous voyages from Kagoshima and Kure to Keelung.

On 20 October 1944, Kashima was spotted by the submarine USS Tang, which closed to within 2,000 yards (2,000 m), but was unable to attack as its new Mark 18-1 electric torpedoes lacked the speed and range.

On 20 December 1944, Kashima was modified at Kure Naval Arsenal with its torpedo tubes replaced by two unshielded twin 40-caliber Type 89 127 mm HA-gun mounts, four triple-mount Type 96 25 mm AA guns, along with a Type 22 surface-search radar, hydrophones and sonar. Two Type 2 infra-red communication devices were also installed. Kashima's aft compartments were modified into concrete-protected magazines for up to 100 depth charges, with four depth charge throwers and two rails installed on the quarterdeck. In addition, eight Type 96 single mount 25 mm AA guns were added, bringing the total number to 38 barrels, and a Type 13 air-search radar was also installed.

From February 1945, Kashima was assigned to anti-submarine patrol duty in the South China Sea and off Korea. On 19 May 1945, Kashima collided with and sank the cargo ship Daishin Maru in Tsushima Strait. A gasoline tank in Kashima's port bow was damaged in the collision, causing a fire, but she managed to make it to Chinkai, Korea for repairs. Kashima continued its convoy escort and anti-submarine patrols off Korea until the end of the war.

Kashima was officially stricken from the Navy list on 5 October 1945.

== Postwar career ==
After the war, the American authorities used Kashima as a repatriation transport. A deck house was constructed around her main mast, and the barrels of her guns were sawn off.

From 10 October 1945 – 12 November 1946 Kashima made a total of 12 voyages to New Guinea, the Solomon Islands, Marshall Islands, Singapore, French Indochina, Taiwan, Indonesia, Thailand and Hong Kong, transporting some 5,800 former Imperial Japanese Army troops and POWs back to Japan.

Between 15 November 1946 and 15 June 1947, Kashima was broken up for scrap at Nagasaki.

== Bibliography ==
- Brown, David (1990). Warship Losses of World War Two. Naval Institute Press. ISBN 1-55750-914-X.
- D'Albas, Andrieu (1965). Death of a Navy: Japanese Naval Action in World War II. Devin-Adair Pub. ISBN 0-8159-5302-X.
- Dull, Paul S. (1978). A Battle History of the Imperial Japanese Navy, 1941-1945. Naval Institute Press. ISBN 0-87021-097-1.
- Evans, David (1979). Kaigun : Strategy, Tactics, and Technology in the Imperial Japanese Navy, 1887-1941. Naval Institute Press. ISBN 0-87021-192-7.
- Howarth, Stephen (1983). The Fighting Ships of the Rising Sun: The drama of the Imperial Japanese Navy, 1895-1945. Atheneum. ISBN 0-689-11402-8.
- Jentsura, Hansgeorg (1976). Warships of the Imperial Japanese Navy, 1869-1945. Naval Institute Press. ISBN 0-87021-893-X.
- Lacroix, Eric & Wells II, Linton (1997). Japanese Cruisers of the Pacific War. Annapolis, Maryland: Naval Institute Press. ISBN 0-87021-311-3.
- Whitley, M.J. (1995). Cruisers of World War Two: An International Encyclopedia. Naval Institute Press. ISBN 1-55750-141-6.
- Worth, Richard (2001). Fleets of World War II. Da Capo Press. ISBN 0-306-81116-2.
