= Jingei-class submarine tender =

1920s Imperial Japanese Navy ships

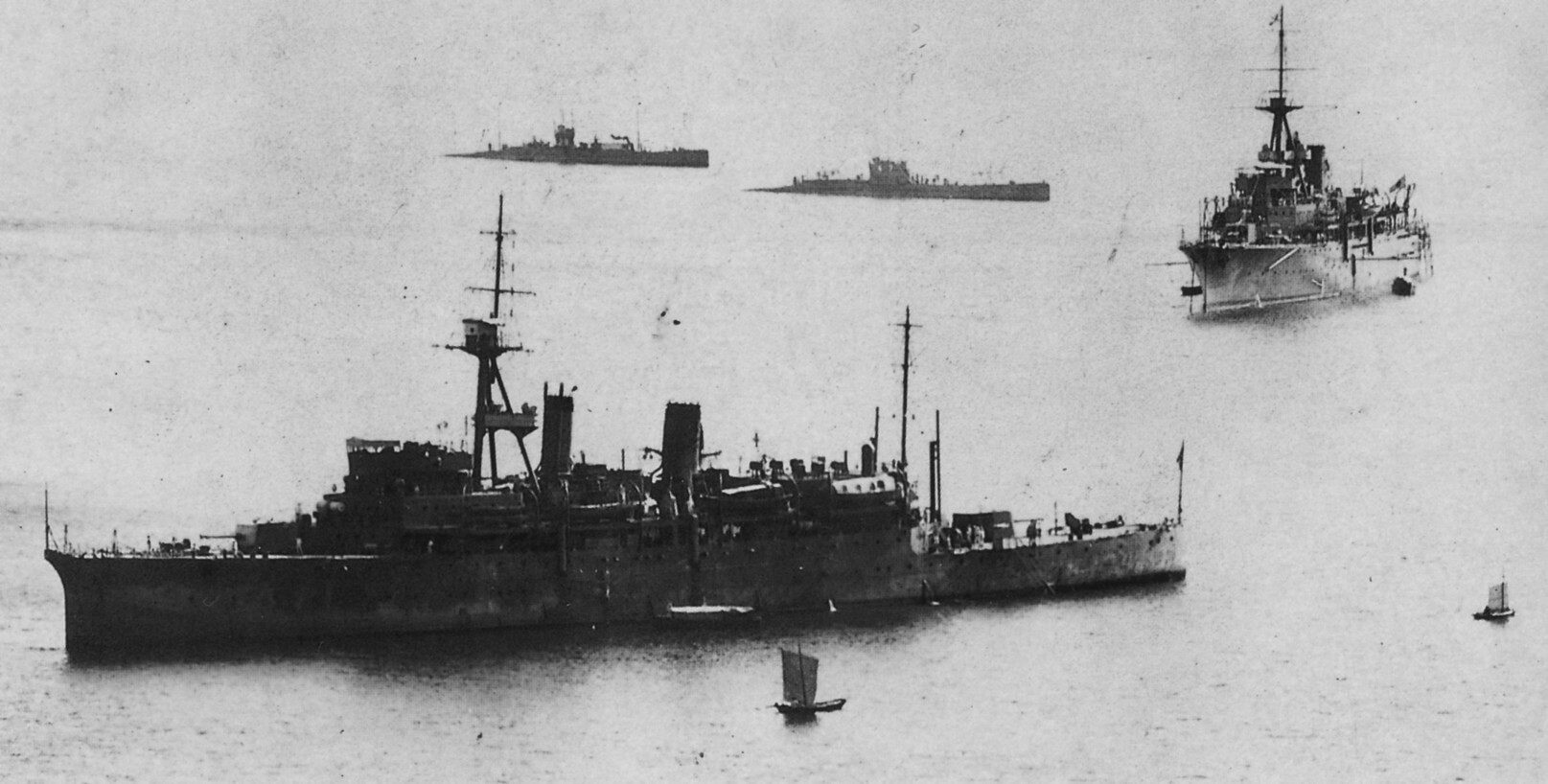
- Jingei (above) and Chōgei in 1924

Class overview
- Name: Jingei-class submarine tender
- Builders: Mitsubishi Heavy Industries
- Operators: Imperial Japanese Navy
- Cost: 2,900,000 JPY
- Built: 1922 – 1924
- In commission: 1923 – 1945
- Planned: 2
- Completed: 2
- Lost: 1
- Retired: 1

General characteristics (initial)
- Displacement: 5,160 long tons (5,243 t) standard; 7,678 long tons (7,801 t) trial
- Length: 125.40 m (411 ft 5 in) overall; 123.00 m (403 ft 7 in) waterline
- Beam: 16.22 m (53 ft 3 in)
- Draught: 6.28 m (20 ft 7 in)
- Propulsion: 2 × Parsons geared turbines; 2 shafts, 7,500 shp; Jingei; 6 × Kampon coal/oil-fired boilers; Chōgei; 5 × Kampon coal/oil-fired boilers
- Speed: 18.5 knots (21.3 mph; 34.3 km/h)
- Range: 10,400 nmi (19,300 km) at 14 kn (16 mph; 26 km/h)
- Capacity: 1,900 tons oil; 27 × torpedoes; 3 × periscopes
- Complement: Jingei: 364; Chōgei: 399
- Armament: Jingei, 1923; 4 × 140 mm L/50 naval guns; 2 × 76.2 mm (3.00 in) L/40 AA guns; 2 × 7.7 mm machine guns
- Aircraft carried: 1927-1942; 1 × float plane
- Aviation facilities: derrick and deck

General characteristics (and after 1935)
- Displacement: 6,240 long tons (6,340 t) standard; 8,288 long tons (8,421 t) trial
- Length: 123.47 m (405 ft 1 in) waterline
- Beam: 17.15 m (56 ft 3 in)
- Draught: 6.60 m (21 ft 8 in)
- Speed: 16.0 knots (18.4 mph; 29.6 km/h)
- Armament: Jingei, 1944; 4 × 140 mm (5.5 in) L/50 naval guns; 2 × 76.2 mm L/40 AA guns; 2 × Type 96 25 mm AA guns; 4 × Type 93 13 mm AA guns; 1 × 21-Gō early warning radar; Chōgei, 1945; 4 × 140 mm L/50 naval guns; 2 × 76.2 mm L/40 AA guns; 14 × Type 96 25 mm AA guns; 4 × Type 93 13 mm AA guns; 1 × 21-Gō early warning radar

The Jingei-class submarine tenders (迅鯨型潜水母艦,, Jingei-gata Sensuibokan) were a class of submarine tenders of the Imperial Japanese Navy (IJN), and served from the 1920s through World War II. Two vessels of this class were built between 1922 and 1924 under the Eight-eight fleet plan.

== Background ==
The IJN planned to build over 100 submarines under the Eight-eight fleet plan, and it was recognized that support ships would be needed. The Jingei class was planned specifically for this purpose. The duties of a submarine tender included serving as a flagship for the Submarine Division Commander and as a depot ship for the nine Kaichū-type submarines in a division.

== Design ==
At first, the Jingei class was planned as a 14,500 ton submarine tender. However, the specifications were revised to 8,500 tons (standard), as stipulated by the Washington Naval Treaty. This treaty would turn out to have a great impact on the Japanese shipbuilding industry. The IJN had intended to develop a large naval fleet, but under the treaty stipulations, its size had to be greatly reduced. As a result, many shipbuilding companies incurred financial difficulty.

The IJN contracted the design and construction of Jingei to Mitsubishi. Naval contracts were directed toward Mitsubishi to prevent it from suffering the financial difficulty that had befallen other companies. The IJN provided only a specifications, allowing greater freedom of design. The IJN recycled eight Tosa-class coal/oil-fired boilers for the development of the Jingei class. Mitsubishi engineers worked on the design until the displacement of Jingei was reduced to 8000 tons in the basic plan. However, the maximum speed was increased by 2.5 knots.

When Mitsubishi designers went to work developing the Katori-class cruiser, they implemented many design innovations that had been developed during their work on Jingei. As a result, the Katori-class cruisers came to resemble the Jingei-class submarine tenders.

== Service ==
The Jingei and its sister ship, the Chōgei, took over the duties of the submarine tenders Karasaki and Komahashi. The two new Jingei-class ships were welcomed by the sailors of the submarine fleets. However, the Jingei-class submarine tenders were unable to support the Kaidai-type submarines. This duty was taken up by the 5,500 ton Kuma- and Nagara-class cruisers.

In 1934, both Jingei-class ships were converted to training ships. Following the Tomozuru Incident that occurred on 13 March 1934, all ships of the Japanese Navy were subject to inspection and renovation of design flaws that would put the ship in danger of capsizing. Renovations were begun on the Jingei in November 1934 at the Sasebo Naval Arsenal. Overhaul of the Chōgei was started in October 1935 at Kure Naval Arsenal. Both ships were equipped with new ballast tanks and bilge pumps.

On 15 November 1940, the two Jingei-class ships were returned to Submarine Division Command and replaced the Takasaki and the Tsurugizaki, both of which had been flexibly designed and were converted to aircraft carriers. The IJN Jingei was assigned to the 7th Submarine Division, 4th Fleet. The IJN Chōgei was assigned to the 3rd Submarine Division, 6th Fleet.

== Ships in class ==
Ship	Builder	Laid down	Launched	Completed	Fate
Jingei (迅鯨)	Mitsubishi, Nagasaki Shipyard	16 February 1922	4 May 1923	30 August 1923	Sunk by aircraft at Okinawa on 10 October 1944. Salvaged and scrapped in 1952.
Chōgei (長鯨)	Mitsubishi, Nagasaki Shipyard	11 March 1922	24 March 1924	2 August 1924	Decommissioned on 15 October 1945. Scrapped on 1 March 1947.

== Photos ==
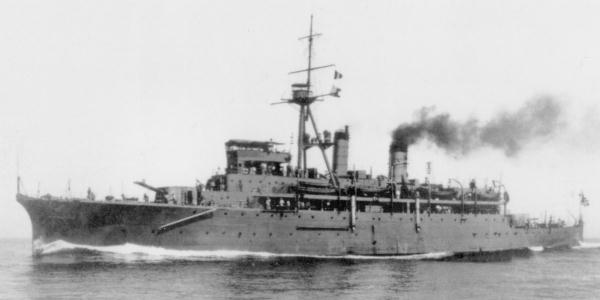
Jingei in 1923

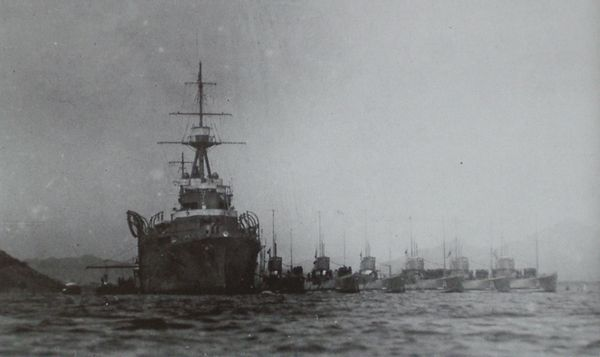
Jingei and Submarine Flotilla 26

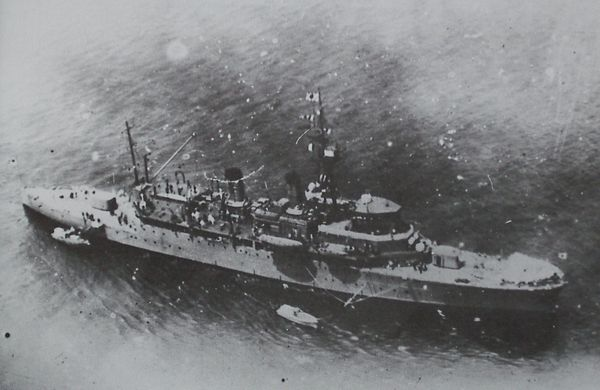
Jingei in 1937

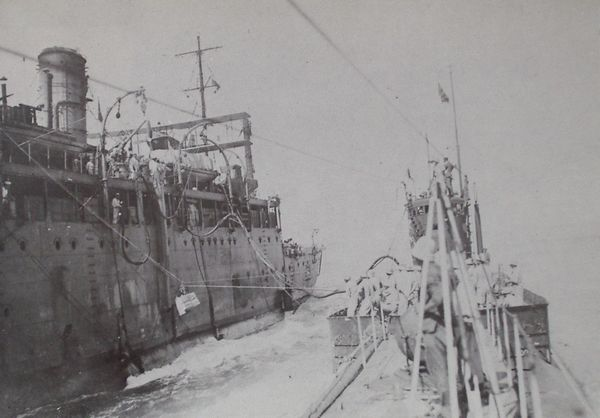
Jingei in action

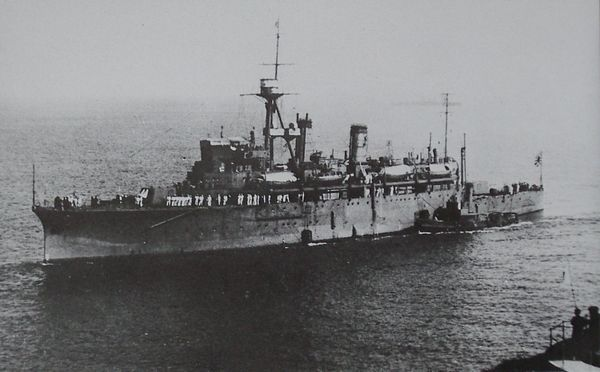
Chōgei in 1926

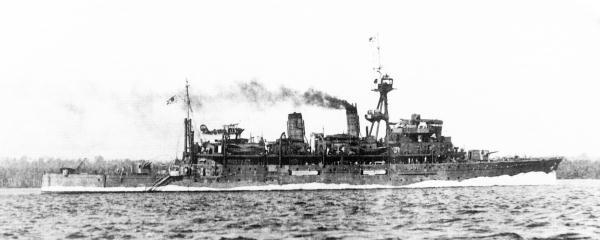
Chōgei in 1942

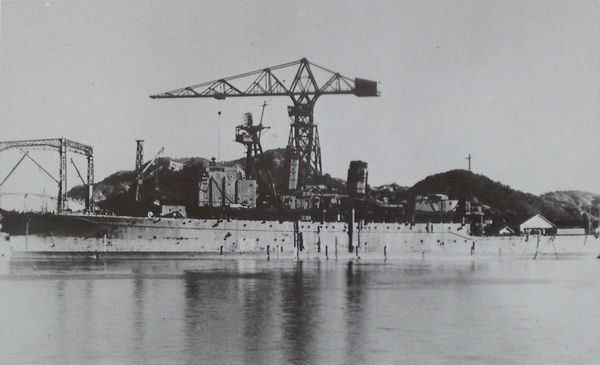
Chōgei in 1946

== Bibliography ==
- "Rekishi Gunzō"., History of Pacific War Vol.51, The truth histories of the Imperial Japanese Vessels Part.2, Gakken (Japan), August 2005, ISBN 4-05-604083-4
- Rekishi Gunzō, History of Pacific War Vol.45, The truth histories of the Imperial Japanese Vessels, Gakken (Japan), May 2004, ISBN 4-05-603412-5
- Ships of the World special issue Vol.47, Auxiliary Vessels of the Imperial Japanese Navy, "Kaijinsha"., (Japan), March 1997
- The Maru Special, Japanese Naval Vessels No.29, Japanese submarine tenders w/ auxiliary submarine tenders, "Ushio Shobō". (Japan), July 1979
- The Maru Special, Japanese Naval Vessels No.135, Japanese submarines IV, Ushio Shobō (Japan), May 1988
