= Japanese submarine tender Jingei =

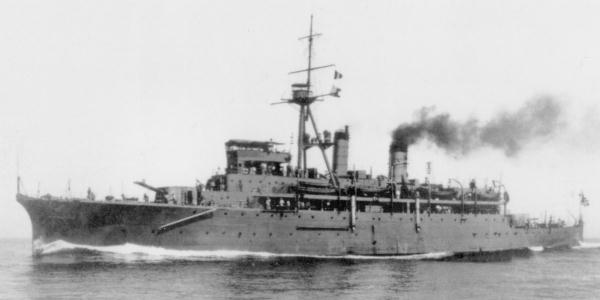
- Jingei in 1923

History

Japan
- Name: Jingei
- Ordered: 1920 Fiscal Year
- Builder: Mitsubishi Nagasaki Shipyards
- Laid down: 16 February 1922
- Launched: 4 May 1923
- Completed: 30 August 1923
- Out of service: 10 October 1944
- Stricken: 10 November 1944
- Fate: Scrapped 1953

General characteristics initial
- Class & type: Jingei-class submarine tender
- Displacement: 5,160 long tons (5,243 t) standard; 7,678 long tons (7,801 t) trial
- Length: 125.40 m (411 ft 5 in) overall; 123.00 m (403 ft 7 in) waterline
- Beam: 16.22 m (53 ft 3 in)
- Draught: 6.28 m (20 ft 7 in)
- Installed power: 7,500 shp (5,600 kW)
- Propulsion: 2 × Parsons geared turbines; 6 × Kampon coal/oil-fired boilers, 2-shafts
- Speed: 18.5 knots (21.3 mph; 34.3 km/h)
- Range: 10,400 nmi (19,300 km) at 14 kn (16 mph; 26 km/h)
- Capacity: 40 torpedoes, 1700 tons of fuel
- Complement: 364
- Armament: 4 × 14 cm/50 3rd Year Type naval guns; 2 × 8 cm/40 3rd Year Type naval guns; 2 × 7.7 mm machine guns
- Aircraft carried: 1927-1942; 1 × float plane
- Aviation facilities: derrick and deck

General characteristics after 1935
- Displacement: 6,240 long tons (6,340 t) standard; 8,288 long tons (8,421 t) trial
- Length: 123.47 m (405 ft 1 in) waterline
- Beam: 17.15 m (56 ft 3 in)
- Draught: 6.60 m (21 ft 8 in)
- Speed: 16.0 knots (18.4 mph; 29.6 km/h)
- Electronic warfare & decoys: 1 × 21-Gō early warning radar
- Armament: 4 × 14 cm/50 3rd Year Type naval guns; 2 × 8 cm/40 3rd Year Type naval guns; 2 × Type 96 25 mm AA guns; 4 × Type 93 13 mm AA guns

Jingei (迅鯨, Swift Whale), was the lead vessel of the Jingei-class submarine tenders operated by the Imperial Japanese Navy, from the 1920s through World War II. She was the first purpose-built submarine tender in the Imperial Japanese Navy.

== Background ==
Under the Eight-eight fleet plan, the Imperial Japanese Navy planned to acquire 100 submarines for long-distance scouting operations, which would also be used to conduct attrition warfare against any enemy fleet approaching Japan. Jingei was intended to serve as a flagship for the Submarine Division Commander and as a depot ship for the nine submarines in a submarine division.

Initially, Jingei was planned as a 14,500-ton vessel; however, her specifications were scaled down to 8,500-tons due to restrictions imposed by the Washington Naval Treaty.

== Design ==
Jingei was built by Mitsubishi Yards in Nagasaki, and the contractor was given an unusually free hand in her design. In order to keep costs to a minimum, the basic design of her hull was adapted from that of a standard civilian merchant vessel, of which Mitsubishi had considerable experience in building. Her coal/oil-fired boilers were taken from the cancelled Tosa-class battleship project. As Mitsubishi was also working on the Katori-class cruisers at the same time, many design innovations that had been developed by Mitsubishi engineers were shared between the two classes, and as a result, the Katori-class cruisers came to bear a superficial resemblance to the Jingei-class submarine tenders.

== Operational career ==
Jingei was laid down on 16 February 1922, launched on 4 May 1923 and completed on 30 August 1923. Initially assigned to the Yokosuka Naval District, she replaced the aging Karasaki.

Following the Tomozuru Incident of 13 March 1934, all ships of the Japanese Navy were subject to inspection and renovation of design flaws that would put the ship in danger of capsizing. Renovations were begun on Jingei in November 1934 at the Sasebo Naval Arsenal to equip the vessel with new ballast tanks and bilge pumps. As the Jingei-class submarine tenders were unable to support the new Kaidai-class submarines, they were reassigned to the Training Fleet around this time, and their duties as submarine tenders were taken up by the new Kuma-class cruisers.

After the Marco Polo Bridge Incident of 7 July 1937, Jingei was part of the escort for the convoys transporting the IJA 10th Division to northern China, but took no further combat role in the Second Sino-Japanese War.

On 15 November 1940, in preparation for the coming conflict with the United States, both Jingei-class ships were returned to active combat status, replacing Takasaki and Tsuruguzaki, which were then converted to aircraft carriers. Jingei was assigned as flagship of the 7th Submarine Squadron, IJN 4th Fleet, and was equipped with a Kawanishi E7K2 reconnaissance floatplane.

Following the start of the Pacific War, Jingei participated in the Battle of Wake Island from 8–10 December 1941. On 29 December 1941, she went to the rescue of the submarine Ro-60, which had run aground on a reef north of Kwajalein. The submarine was a total loss, but all of her crewmen were rescued.

On 14 July 1942, Jingei was reassigned to the IJN 8th Fleet based in Rabaul. She was relieved by her sister ship, Chōgei on 7 November 1943, and was withdrawn back to Japan, arriving at Kure Naval District by the end of the month.

On 12 January 1943, Jingei was reassigned to Kure Naval District as a training vessel for the Kure Submarine Warfare School, where she remained for the remainder of the year. On 16 October 1943, she was sent to render assistance to the supply ship Mamiya, which had been torpedoed off Chichijima. In December, she towed Hull 300 from Kure to Sasebo Naval Arsenal for conversion in the aircraft carrier Ibuki.

Jingei returned to front-line combat status on 1 January 1944 as flagship of Submarine Squadron 41, based at Kure. In summer, her main guns were replaced with 18 Type 96 25-mm antiaircraft guns. She subsequently made three roundtrips to Okinawa as a transport for supplies and reinforcements from 11 August through 18 September 1944. On her fourth mission to Okinawa, on 19 September 1944, she was torpedoed 80 miles northwest of Naha by USS Scabbardfish. She was towed to Okinawa and beached northwest of Naha. On 10 October 1944, the immobile Jingei was attacked by Allied aircraft of Task Force 38 launched from USS Hancock and sank in shallow waters at 26°39′N 127°52′E, with the loss of 100 crewmen. Jingei officially struck from the navy list on 10 November 1944. In September 1952, she was refloated and towed to Tobata-ku, Kitakyūshū, where her hulk was salvaged for scrap.

== Gallery ==
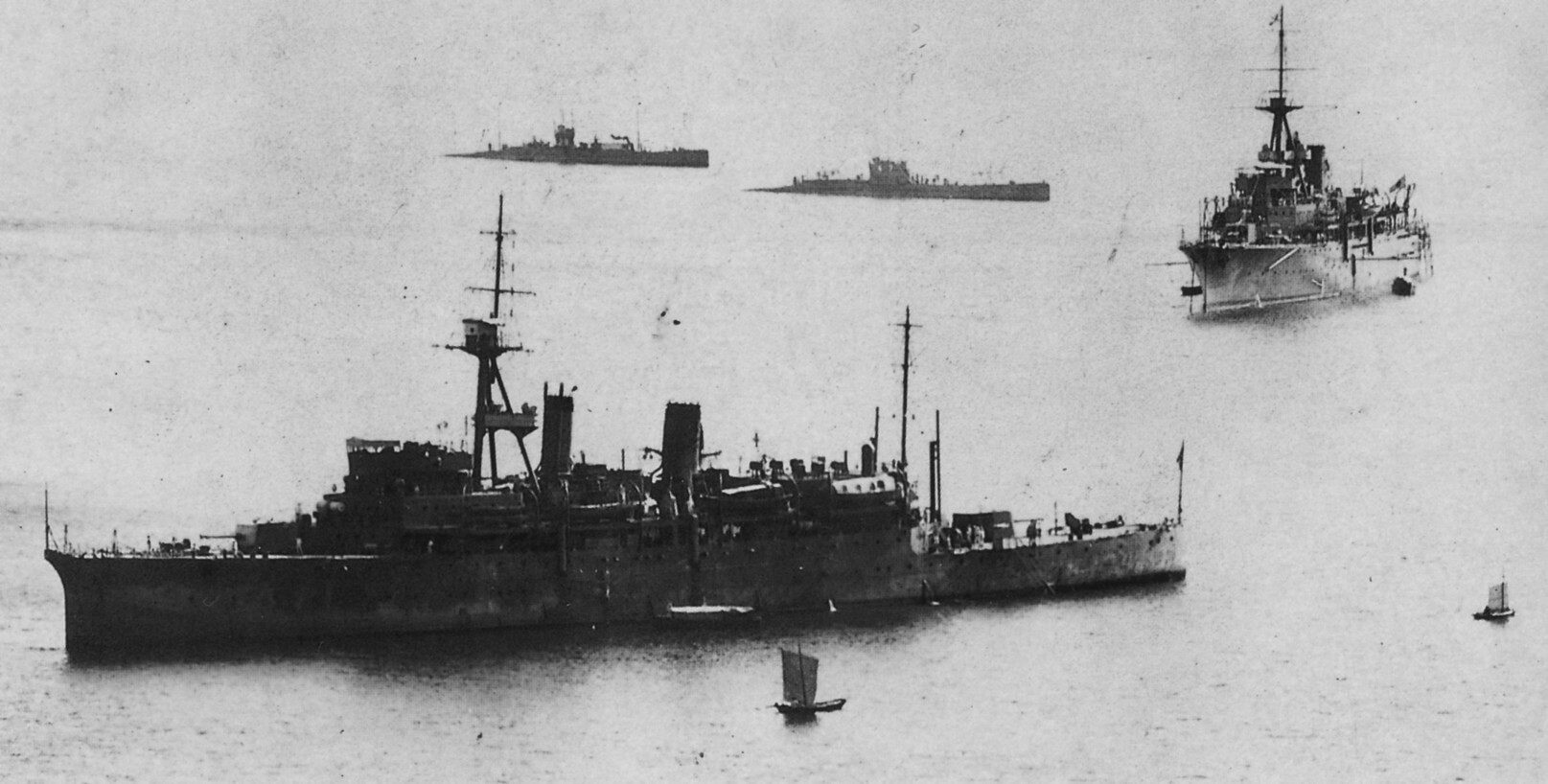
With Chōgei 1924

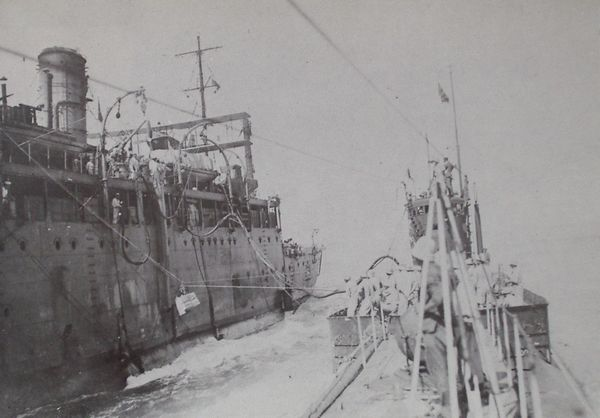
With Submarine I-5

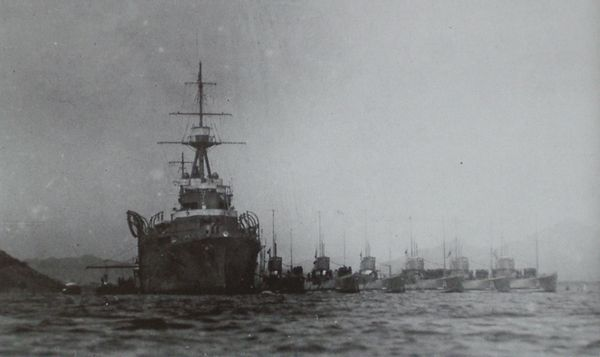
With Submarine Flotilla 26 in 1927

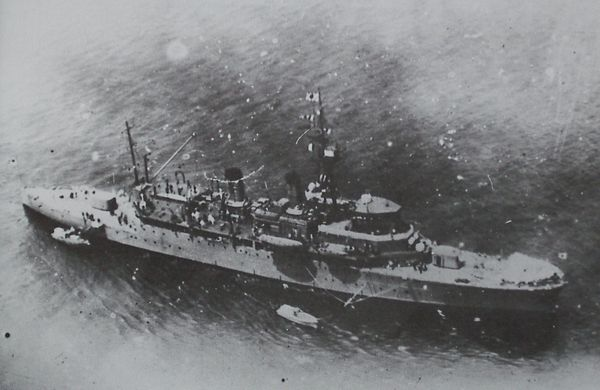
In 1937

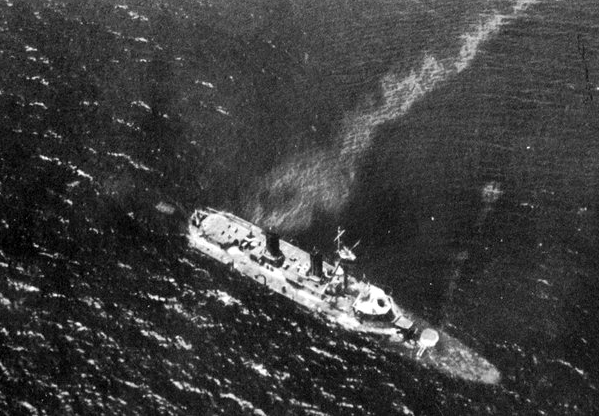
Wrecked in 1944
