= Takasago Maru =

Hospital ship of Imperial Japanese Navy

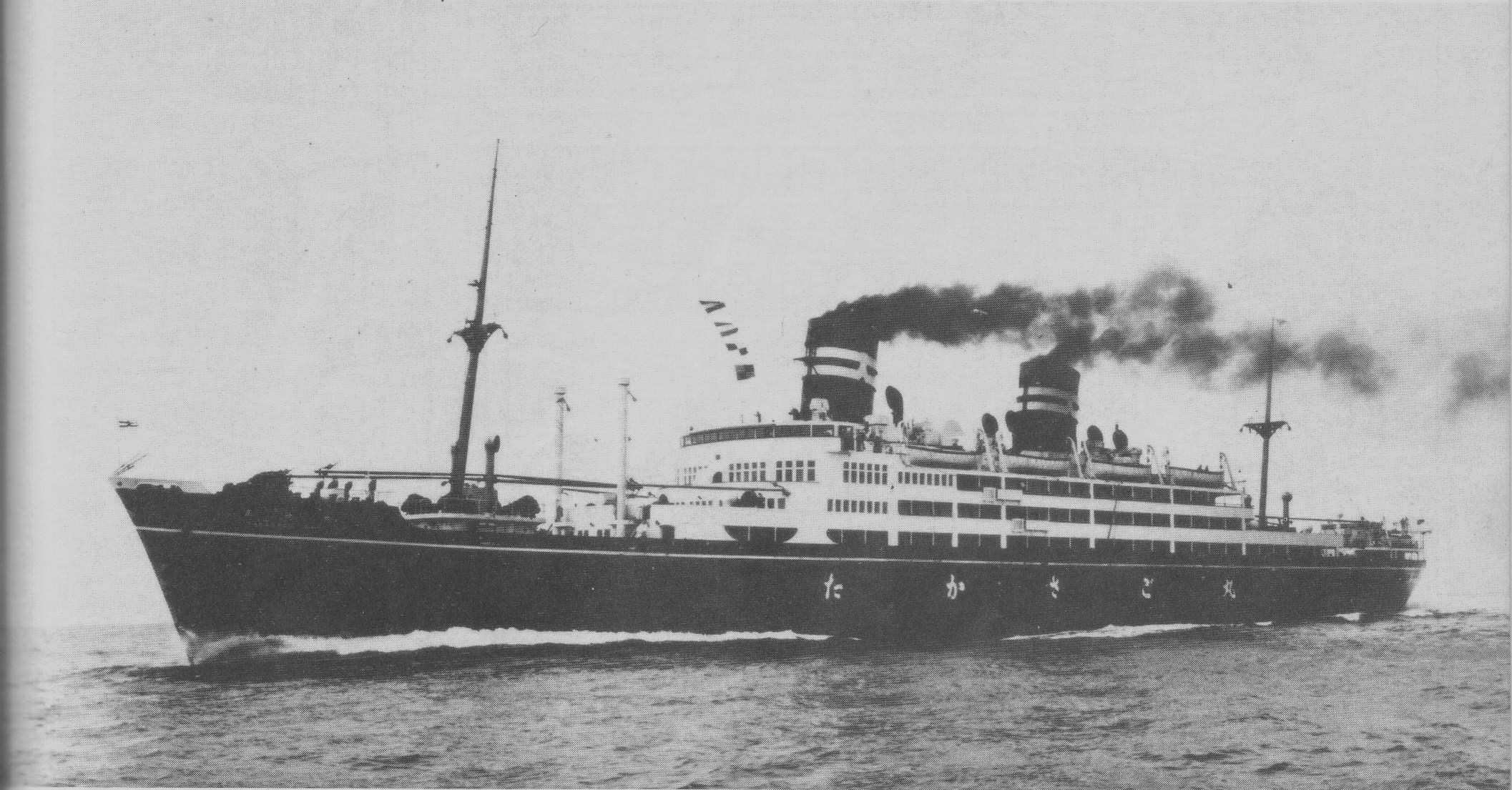
- Takasago Maru underway in 1937

History

Japan
- Name: Takasago Maru; (たかさほ まる)
- Owner: Mitsui O.S.K. Lines; (OSK Line)
- Operator: OSK Line (1937–41); (Empire of Japan) Imperial Japanese Navy (1941–1945); (Japan) SCAJAP (1945–56)
- Builder: Mitsubishi, Nagasaki
- Laid down: 9 June 1936
- Launched: 1 December 1936
- Completed: 28 April 1937
- Commissioned: 28 April 1937
- Decommissioned: 23 March 1956
- Reclassified: 1 December 1941
- Refit: 20 December 1941
- Fate: Scrapped in 1956

General characteristics
- Type: Cargo liner
- Tonnage: 9,315 GRT
- Length: 142.09 m (466 ft 2 in)
- Beam: 18.50 m (60 ft 8 in)
- Draft: 7.524 m (24 ft 8.2 in)
- Depth: 11.60 m (38 ft 1 in)
- Installed power: 12,641 hp (9,426 kW)
- Propulsion: 2 x Mitsubishi steam turbines; 2 x shafts
- Speed: 15.34–20.15 knots (28.41–37.32 km/h; 17.65–23.19 mph)
- Boats & landing craft carried: 4 x life boats
- Capacity: 901–958 passengers

Takasago Maru (高砂丸) was a passenger-cargo liner of OSK Line which later transferred to the Imperial Japanese Navy as a hospital ship.

== Construction and career ==
She was laid down on 9 June 1936 and launched on 1 December 1936 by Mitsubishi Heavy Industries in Nagasaki. She was commissioned on 28 April 1937 into the Mitsui OSK Line.

Throughout 1937 to 1941, she made trips to Kobe, Keelung and Moji.

On 12 November 1941, she was acquired by the Imperial Japanese Navy and converted to a hospital ship by Kure Naval Arsenal on 1 December. On 8 April 1942, she was lightly damaged by mistake by USS Porpoise and again on 26 April by USS Pickerel in the Manipa Strait despite her clear designation as a hospital ship. On 14 June 1941, she carried 500 patients while being escorted by the cruiser Nagara. On 15 June, Rear Admiral Matome Ugaki departed the battleship Yamato to pay a visit aboard Hikawa Maru and Takasago Maru. She was attacked by aircraft but no damage was sustained from them while anchored off Shortland on 1 November of the same year.

Takasago Maru was escorted by the destroyer Akebono as they arrived at Truk on 5 September 1943. On 18 December, she transferred medical supplies to the cruiser Katori at Harujima. She departed Singapore on 28 February 1944 for Saigon. The supply ship Mamiya replenished Takasago Maru on 17 April.

USS Pilotfish encountered Takasago Maru on 5 February 1945 and let the Japanese ship go as she was clearly marked as a hospital ship. On 19 March, she was anchored near the battleships Ise and Haruna during the attack on Kure and escaped the harbor undamaged. USS Murray conducted an onboard search for violations and contraband but found her to be clear and let her continue to Wake Island on 2 July. The same thing happened again five days later on 7 July, when USS McDermut conducted a search. While she was in Maizuru on 25 July, planes from the aircraft carrier USS Yorktown attacked the harbor but with no hits on Takasago Maru. On 1 December, she was assigned to the Allied Repatriation Service at Kure.

Between 1947 and 1956, she made trips to evacuate Japanese prisoners of war in Siberia and Nakhodka. On 23 March 1956, she was sold to Namura Shipbuilding, K. K., Osaka for scrapping.

== Gallery ==
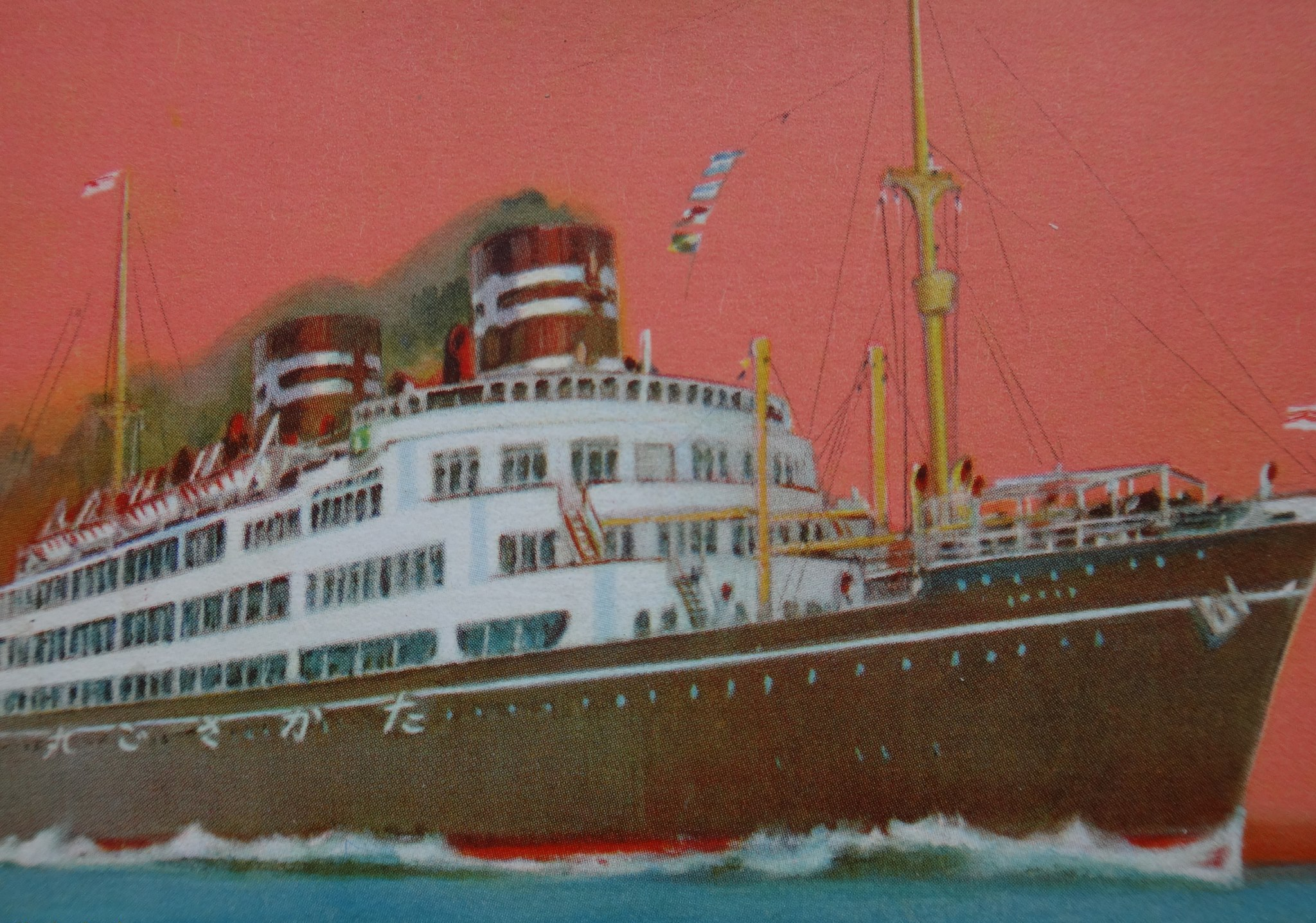
Painting of Takasago Maru.

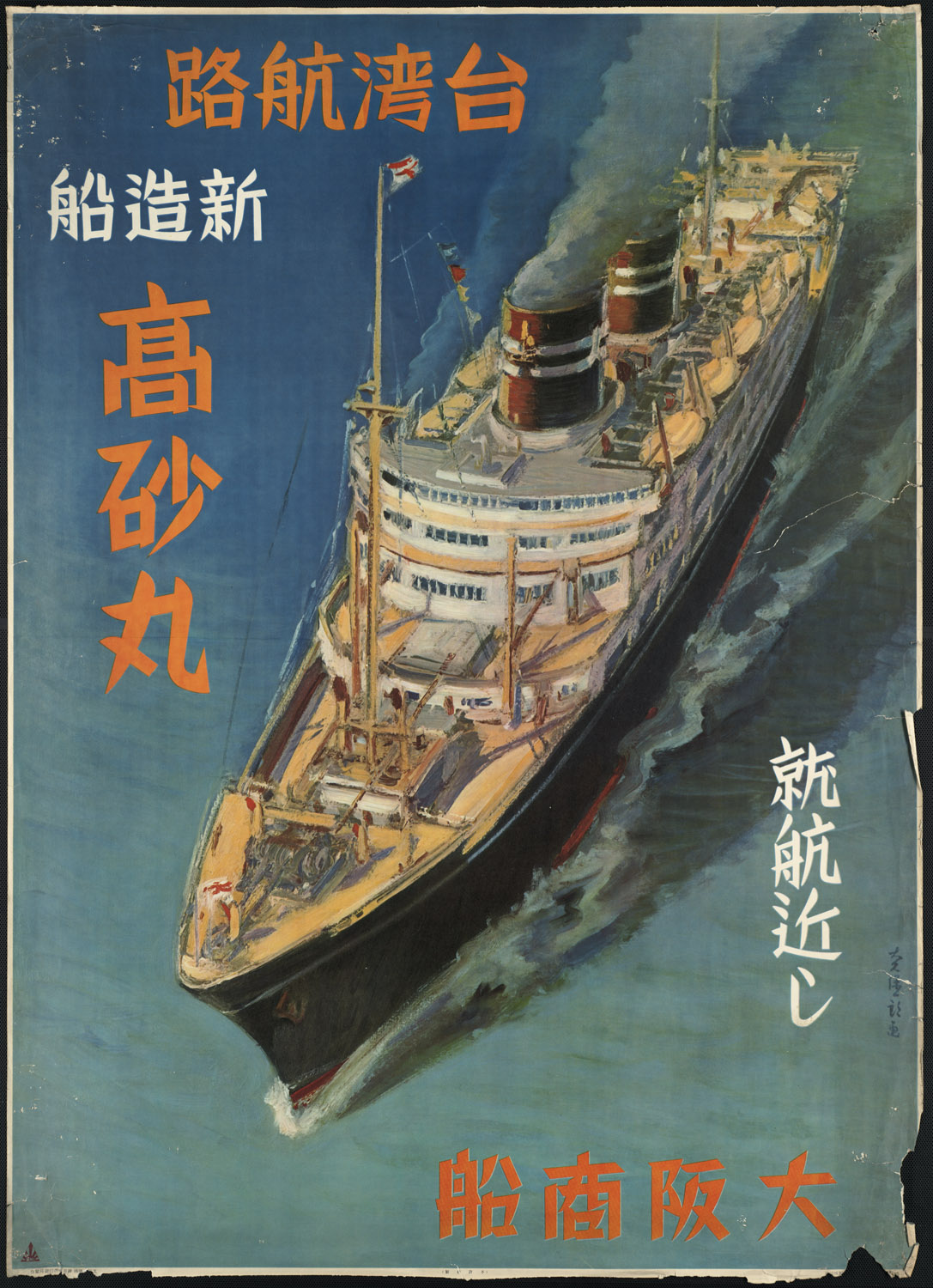
A 1937 poster of Takasago Maru.

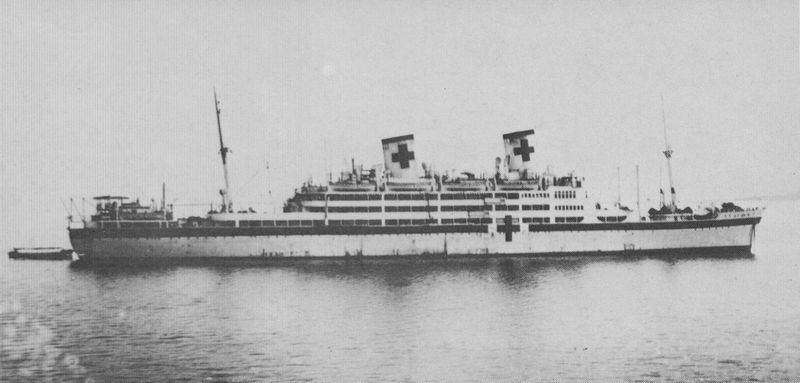
Takasago Maru as a hospital ship in 1945.
