= USS McDermut =

Two ships of the United States Navy have been named USS McDermut for David McDermut. A native of New York, McDermut was appointed midshipman on November 8, 1841, and attained the rank of lieutenant commander on July 16, 1862. During the Civil War, he served in Potomac and Marion before assuming command of Cayuga on December 2, 1862. He commanded Cayuga until April 18, 1863, when he was killed in action against Confederate forces near Sabine Pass.

- USS McDermut (DD-262), was a Clemson-class destroyer, commissioned in 1919 and decommissioned in 1929
- USS McDermut (DD-677), was a Fletcher-class destroyer, commissioned in 1943 and decommissioned in 1963
