= USS McDermut (DD-677) =

Fletcher-class destroyer

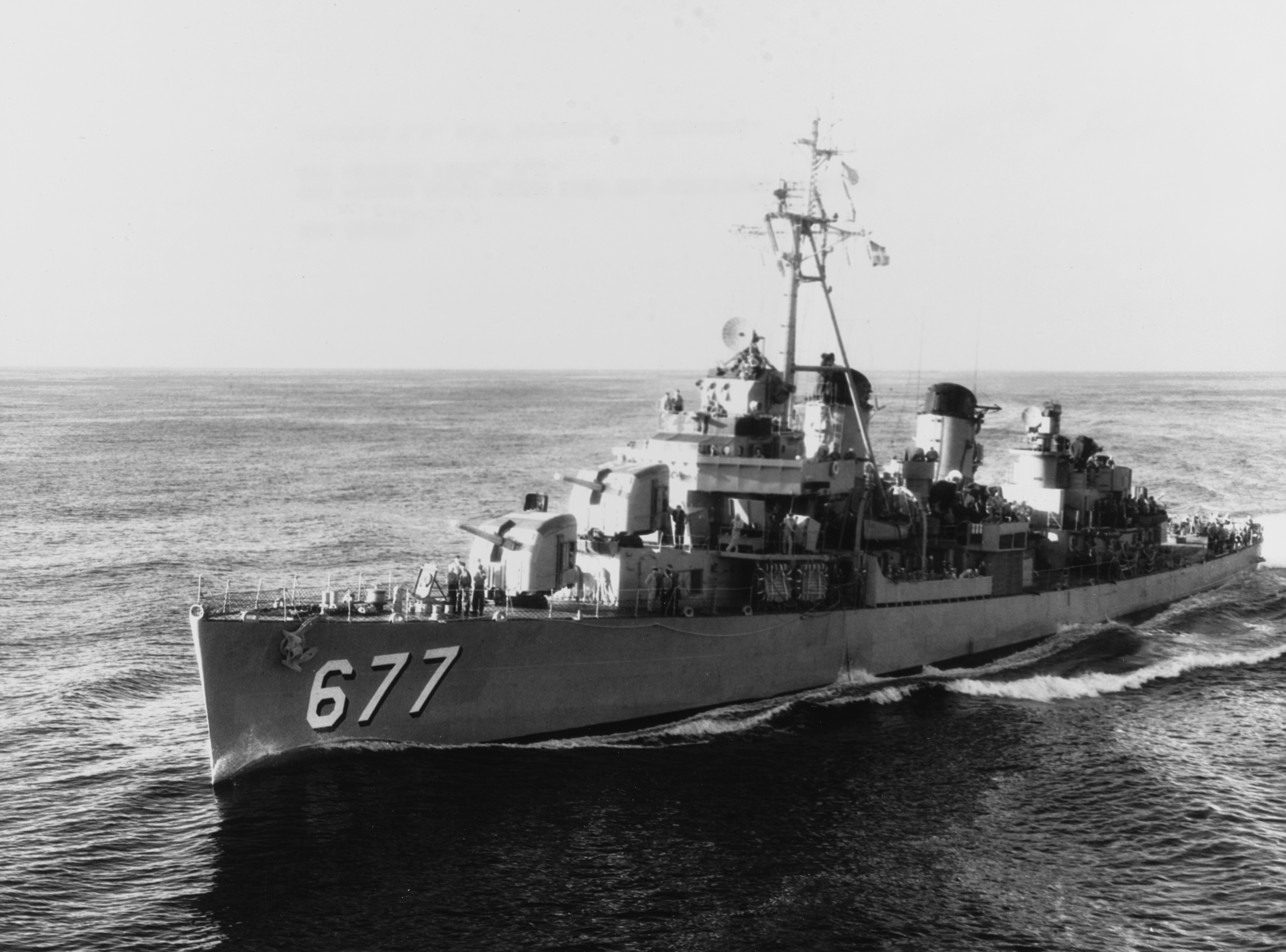
- :USS McDermut (DD-677) underway in the 1950s

History

United States
- Name: USS McDermut
- Namesake: David McDermut
- Builder: Federal Shipbuilding & Dry Dock Co., Kearny, N.J.
- Laid down: 14 June 1943
- Launched: 17 October 1943
- Commissioned: 19 November 1943
- Decommissioned: 16 December 1963
- Stricken: 1 April 1965
- Identification: DD-677
- Fate: Sold for scrap, 4 January 1966

General characteristics
- Class & type: Fletcher-class destroyer
- Displacement: 2,050 tons
- Length: 376 ft 6 in (114.76 m)
- Beam: 39 ft 8 in (12.09 m)
- Draft: 17 ft 9 in (5.41 m)
- Propulsion: 60,000 shp (45,000 kW); geared turbines; 2 propellers
- Speed: 35 knots (65 km/h; 40 mph)
- Range: 6,500 nautical miles (12,000 km; 7,500 mi) at 15 knots (28 km/h; 17 mph)
- Complement: 319
- Armament: 5 × 5 in (127 mm) DP guns, 10 × 40 mm AA guns, 7 × 20 mm AA guns, 10 × 21 in (53 cm) torpedo tubes, 6 × depth charge projectors, 2 × depth charge tracks

USS McDermut (DD-677) was a Fletcher-class destroyer of the United States Navy, the second Navy ship named for Lieutenant Commander David A. McDermut.

McDermut was laid down 14 June 1943 by the Federal Shipbuilding & Dry Dock Co., Kearny, New Jersey; launched 17 October 1943; sponsored by Mrs. Woodrow Wilson, widow of the 28th President; and commissioned 19 November 1943.

== World War II ==
McDermut, departed New York 25 January 1944 for duty with the Pacific Fleet. She arrived at Kwajalein 4 March, remained until 20 March and then crossed to Majuro where she joined the Fast Carrier Task Force (then 5th Fleet's TF 58, later 3rd Fleet's TF 38). She sortied with Task Group 58.2 (TG 58.2), 22 March, and before returning to Majuro, 6 April, participated in strikes on Palau, Yap, Ulithi, and Woleai. Next assigned to cargo and escort work, she steamed back to Pearl Harbor, returning to Kwajalein 31 May.

On 10 June McDermut got underway with TG 52.17 for Saipan and preinvasion bombardment duties. Assigned to fire support during the landing operations, the destroyer cruised off Tanapag Harbor, firing on small Japanese demolition craft as they attempted to set fire to shipping there. After 17 June she took up antisubmarine and antiaircraft patrol duties which she continued until 24 June. She then steamed to Eniwetok where she joined TF 53, and with that force bombarded the shore and then covered the landings at Guam. On 22 July she returned to the Saipan-Tinian area for further fire support duties during mopping up operations on the latter island.

McDermut, detached from her second duty with TG 52.17, 4 August, sailed to Guadalcanal for rehearsal landings in preparation for the Palau offensive. By 15 September she was in position off Peleliu to support the 1st Marine Division as it landed, shifting to Angaur on the 17th to assist Army assault units. Departing the Palaus on 21 August, she headed northeast for ASW/AAW patrol duty during the occupation of Ulithi Atoll.

Assigned next to the 7th Fleet, McDermut reported 1 October at Manus Island, the staging area for the Leyte operation. On 11 October, the fleet sortied from Seeadler Harbor, entering Leyte Gulf in the early morning hours of the 20th. On that morning McDermut, screening the transports as they approached the Dulag landing area, warded off enemy planes and rescued downed American pilots. In the afternoon, she was ordered to join with the destroyers McGowan and Melvin in an antitorpedo-boat screen in Surigao Strait. Later, as reports of Japanese fleet movements were added to the seemingly constant air attacks on shipping in Leyte Gulf, two more ships of Destroyer Squadron 54 (DesRon 54), Remey and Monssen, joined the screen.

On the night of 24 October Rear Admiral Jesse B. Oldendorf deployed his forces for what was to be the last engagement of a battleline, the Battle of Surigao Strait. ComDesRon 54 divided his ships into eastern and western Attack Groups to launch offensive torpedo attacks as the Japanese steamed up the strait. McDermut was assigned to the Western Group with Monssen and positioned close to the Leyte shore. Soon after midnight the enemy was reported entering the strait. Between 03:00 and 03:01 the Eastern Group commenced launching torpedoes, firing 27 "fish" in less than 2 minutes. At 03:10 McDermut and Monssen launched their attack. At 03:20 explosions flashed, McDermut's torpedoes hitting three destroyers. Yamagumo sank immediately, while Michishio and Asagumo were disabled and drifting, the latter having lost her bow.

After launching their torpedoes, the destroyers retired north as planned, hugging the coastlines of Leyte and Dinagat to avoid fire from the ships of DesRons 24 and 56 and those of the battleline. The squadron's total score with its 47 torpedoes, was five hits and three enemy ships sunk, more than earning Admiral Oldendorf's praise of a "brilliantly conceived and well executed" torpedo attack.

The following evening McDermut departed for Hollandia, arriving 30 October. During November she screened convoys to Leyte and in December headed for the Sulu Sea to support the initial attack on Mindoro on 15 November. By 26 November she was back in Leyte Gulf to take up patrol at the entrance to San Pedro Bay. On 11 January 1945 McDermut steamed into Lingayen Gulf for shore bombardment duty with the reinforcement echelon for Luzon operations. She departed on 15 January, and 8 days later arrived at Ulithi for a 2-month overhaul.

McDernut joined the fast carriers again, 3 April, as they provided air support for the Okinawa campaign. In the screen of TG 58.4, she participated in strikes on enemy installations, shipping, and troop concentrations in the Ryukyu Islands and Kyūshū. By 1 July the aircraft carriers were once again set to strike at the northern Japanese home islands. On 7 July McDermut was sent to intercept the Japanese hospital ship Takasago Maru and divert her from a course which would have taken her into the task force's fueling area. On 8 July, the ship was located and a boarding party was dispatched with a message guaranteeing safe conduct if the captain and crew would comply with instructions and courses given. By 10 April, the ships of TF 38 had refueled and were underway to conduct strikes against the Tokyo industrial area. McDermut released her charge and rejoined TG 38.4 for further strikes on Honshū, Hokkaidō, and the Kuriles.

The destroyer was detached from the carrier force 12 August with orders to proceed, via Adak, to the west coast for a navy yard overhaul. On 14 August, she received word of the Japanese surrender, and new orders to return to Japanese waters with TF 92 for occupation duty in the Ōminato Naval Base area. Two months later she departed Japan for San Francisco, Calif. Arriving in November, she remained in operation on the west coast until decommissioning and going into reserve 15 January 1947.

== 1950 – 1963 ==
In 1950, as hostilities again flared in the Western Pacific, McDermut was brought out of mothballs and recommissioned at Long Beach 29 December. By 6 June 1951, she was at Yokosuka ready for action off Korea. On the 13th, she rendezvoused with TF 77 for operations along the Korean east coast and in Van Diemen Strait. In August she conducted ASW training off the Japanese coast, returning to TF 77 on 30 August. From 21 September through 4 October she participated in the bombardment of Wonsan and then headed south for duty with TG 96.7 off Okinawa. She rejoined TF 77 3 November for another month of Korean combat duty before departing for the United States 7 December.

On 12 August 1952, McDermut once again joined U.N. naval forces off the Korean coast, reporting to the bombardment group in the Wonsan-Songjin-Yang-do area on 13 August. In mid-September she steamed to Japan for escort and plane guard duty with carriers conducting training exercises, followed by duty with the Taiwan patrol. By 26 December she was back off the east coast of Korea for flight operations screening duty with TF 77. On 29 January 1953 she departed for San Diego, arriving 16 February.

For the next 10 years, McDermut maintained an annual schedule of 6 months of west coast operations alternated with western Pacific deployments. The latter, in 1954–55, involved her in the efforts of the 7th Fleet to preclude the possibility of the occupation of the Tachen Islands by the People's Liberation Army.

During 1963 the destroyer remained on the west coast conducting local operations until decommissioned at San Diego on 16 December. She was berthed at San Diego as a part of the Pacific Reserve Fleet. During this time she appeared in the movie "A Ticklish Affair" (George Sidney 1963). She was struck from the Naval Vessel Register on 1 April 1965. McDermut was sold on 4 January 1966 to the National Metal and Steel Corporation, Terminal Island, Los Angeles, California, and was towed away for scrapping in February 1966.

McDermut received 10 battle stars for World War II service and 5 battle stars for Korean War service.
