= Japanese cruiser Kashii =

1940 Katori-class cruiser

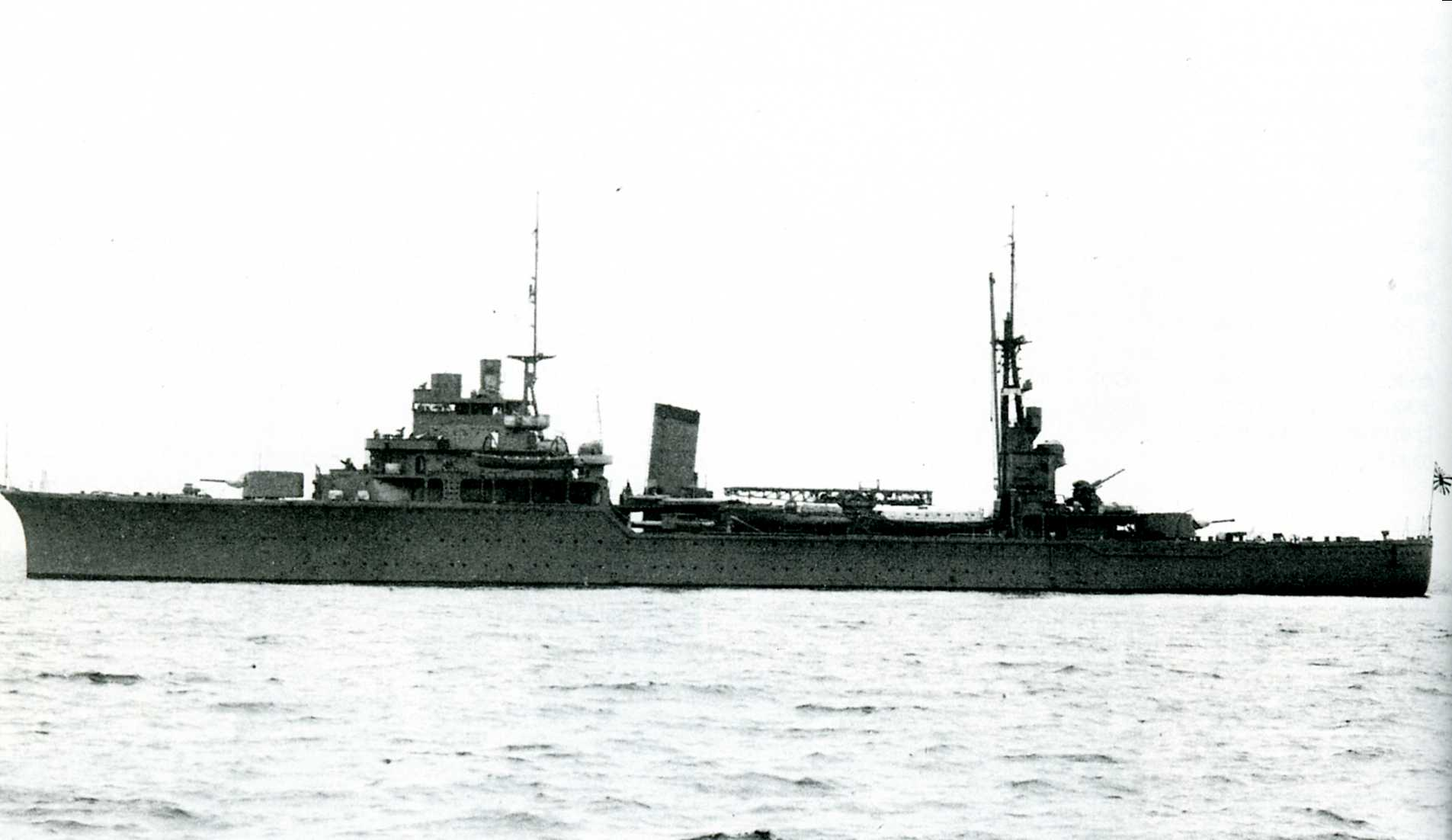
- Kashii on 15 July 1941, at Yokohama during commissioning

History

Empire of Japan
- Name: Kashii
- Ordered: 1939 Fiscal Year
- Builder: Mitsubishi
- Laid down: 4 October 1939
- Launched: 15 October 1940
- Commissioned: 15 July 1941
- Stricken: 20 March 1945
- Fate: sunk 12 January 1945; bombed/torpedoed by USN aircraft off French Indochina, South China Sea13°50′N 109°20′E

General characteristics
- Class & type: Katori-class cruiser
- Displacement: 5,890 long tons (5,985 t) normal; 6,180 long tons (6,279 t) full load
- Length: 129.77 m (425 ft 9 in)
- Beam: 15.95 m (52 ft 4 in)
- Draught: 5.75 m (18 ft 10 in)
- Propulsion: 2-shaft geared turbines, plus diesel motors; 3 Kampon boilers; 8,000 shp (6,000 kW)
- Speed: 18 knots (21 mph; 33 km/h)
- Range: 9,000 nautical miles (17,000 km) at 10 knots (19 km/h)
- Complement: 315 + 275 midshipmen
- Armament: 4 × 140 mm (5.5 in)/50 cal. guns (2×2); 2 × 127 mm (5 in)/40 cal. AA guns (1×2); 4 × Type 96 AA guns (later increased to 30); 8 × 13.2 mm (0.52 in) AA guns; 4 × 533 mm (21 in) torpedo tubes (2×2)
- Aircraft carried: 1 × floatplane
- Aviation facilities: 1 catapult

Kashii (香椎 練習巡洋艦, Kashii renshūjunyōkan; "Kashii training cruiser") was the third and last Katori-class cruiser completed for the Imperial Japanese Navy (IJN) during World War II. The ship was named after Kashii-gū, a Shinto shrine in Fukuoka, Japan.

== Background ==
The Katori-class cruisers were originally ordered to serve as training ships in the 1937 and 1939 Supplementary Naval Budget. With the Pacific War, they were used as administrative flagships for various fleets, such as submarine command and control and to command escort squadrons. The ships were upgraded as the war progressed with additional anti-aircraft guns and depth charges.

== Service career ==
=== Early career ===
Kashii was completed by Mitsubishi shipyards in Yokohama on 15 July 1941 and was initially assigned to Sasebo Naval Base.

With the growing tensions in the Pacific, Kashii was subsequently (31 July 1941) assigned to the Southern Expeditionary Fleet under Vice Admiral Jisaburo Ozawa. On 18 October 1941, Kashii became the flagship of the Southern Expeditionary Fleet based out of Saigon, French Indochina. One month later, Kashii was transferred to Hainan and Vice Admiral Ozawa transferred his flag to the cruiser Chōkai.

On 5 December 1941, Kashii departed Cap St. Jacques, French Indochina escorting seven troops of transports carrying the Imperial Japanese Army's 143rd Infantry Regiment to Kra Isthmus (Thailand) and Malaya, and was thus still en route at the time of the attack on Pearl Harbor.

=== Early stages of the Pacific War ===
After the initial landings in Malaya and Thailand, Kashii returned to Camranh Bay, Indochina on 13 December 1941 to rendezvous with 39 means of transports of the Second Malaya Convoy, which it then escorted to various points along the eastern coast of Thailand and Malaya. It also escorted the Third Malaya convoy from 26–28 December 1941. On 3 January 1942, Kashii rescued troops from the troop transport Meiko Maru which had caught fire and exploded off of Hainan.

From January through March, Kashii patrolled an area from Singapore to Bangkok and eastern Dutch East Indies. On 11 February 1942, it escorted the 11 transports of the Bangka-Palembang, Sumatra invasion force, and on 12 March 1942, participated in "Operation T" (the invasion of North Sumatra).

Kashii became a flagship of the No. 2 Escort Unit on 19 March 1942, which escorted 32 transports with the IJA 56th Infantry Division for the invasion of Burma, and an additional 46 transports carrying the IJA's 18th Infantry Division in early April.

On 11 April 1942, Vice Admiral Ozawa transferred his flag back to Kashii which was now based in Singapore. However, on 14 July 1942 Vice Admiral Denshichi Okawachi replaced Vice Admiral Ozawa. Kashii continued with patrol duties in the eastern Indian Ocean off Burma, the Andaman Islands, and Penang through September.

On 21 September 1942, Kashii departed Saigon on an emergency transport mission to reinforce Japanese forces in the Solomon Islands. Kashii used a fake second funnel in an attempt to mimic an American heavy cruiser. The ruse succeeded, and Kashii successfully landed reinforcements at Rabaul, New Britain on 8 October 1942. It returned to Singapore without incident and resumed its normal patrol duties until mid-January 1943.

In January 1943, Kashii underwent retrofit at Keppel dockyard in Singapore, to truncate its masts and add a "submarine spotting station" to its foretop. Kashii resumed its patrol area in the eastern Indian Ocean from February through end July 1943.

9 March 1943 Vice Admiral Yoshikazu Endo replaced Vice Admiral Okawachi as commander of the First Southern Expeditionary Fleet, Malay Force.

From 24 July 1943 – 22 August 1943, Kashii made two transport runs carrying troops and supplies to Port Blair and Car Nicobar. On 29 August 1943, off Pulo Weh, north Sumatra en route to Sabang, Kashii was attacked by the Royal Navy submarine HMS Trident, which fired all eight of its bow torpedoes but missed. Kashii made five more troop and supply runs to the Andaman Islands from 21 September 1943 - 27 November 1943 without incident.

On 31 December 1943, Kashii was reassigned to the Kure Training Division, arriving at Etajima in February 1944 after retrofitting at Sasebo to assume duty as a training ship for the Imperial Japanese Naval Academy. However, its time as a training vessel was very short.

On 25 March 1944, Kashii was reassigned directly to Headquarters, General Escort Command, and was modified for anti-submarine warfare at Kure Naval Arsenal. Its torpedo tubes were removed and replaced by two Type 89 127 mm twin mount HA guns. Four triple mount Type 96 25 mm AA guns were also installed bringing the total to 20 barrels (4x3, 4x2), a Type 21 air-search radar was fitted and hydrophones and sonar were also added. Kashii's aft compartments were modified into concrete-protected magazines for up to 300 depth charges. Four depth charge throwers and two rails are installed on the quarterdeck. The modification work was completed by 29 April 1944.

=== Later stages of the Pacific War ===
Kashii became flagship for Rear Admiral Mitsuharu Matsuyama's No. 1 Surface Escort Division on 3 May 1944 and departed Moji on 29 May 1944 escorting a convoy to Singapore. On 2 June 1944, the submarine USS Guitarro spotted the convoy east of Taiwan, and sank one of its ships with two torpedoes, but Kashii was undamaged and arrived at Singapore on 12 June 1944 with the remaining vessels in the convoy.

Further, refit was undertaken at Kure on 28 June 1944, with ten single mount Type 96 25 mm AA guns installed, bringing the total to 30 barrels (4x3, 4x2, 10x1), and a new Type 22 surface-search radar was also fitted at that time.

Kashii departed again on 13 July 1944 from Moji, escorting convoy HI-69 loaded with aircraft for Luzon in the Philippines. The convoy arrived safely in Manila, and after offloading aircraft, proceeded to Singapore, returning to Moji without incident on 15 August 1944.

Another convoy mission was undertaken to the Philippines on 25 August 1944. On the return voyage, Kashii was flagship for Rear Admiral Setsuzo Yoshitomi's 5th Escort Group escorting convoy HI-74. The convoy was attacked on 16 September 1944 by the submarines USS Queenfish and Barb, which sank two oilers and the aircraft carrier Un'yō. More than 900 crewmen were lost, along with 48 aircraft. Kashii and the remaining ships rescued 761 survivors, reaching Moji on 23 September 1944.

The next convoy mission (HI-79) to Singapore from 26 October 1944 - 9 November 1944 was uneventful. After arrival, Rear Admiral Shiro Shibuya replaced Admiral Yoshitomi as CINC of the new 101st Escort Group. The return run from Singapore to Sasebo from 17 November 1944 to 4 December 1944 was uneventful.

On 10 December 1944, Kashii was reassigned to the 1st Surface Escort Group and departed Moji for Takao, Taiwan with a convoy of Army transports. From Takao, Kashii was assigned another convoy to Singapore. The new convoy was attacked by USAAF B-25 Mitchell bombers off Hainan on 25 December 1944 but escaped with little damage.

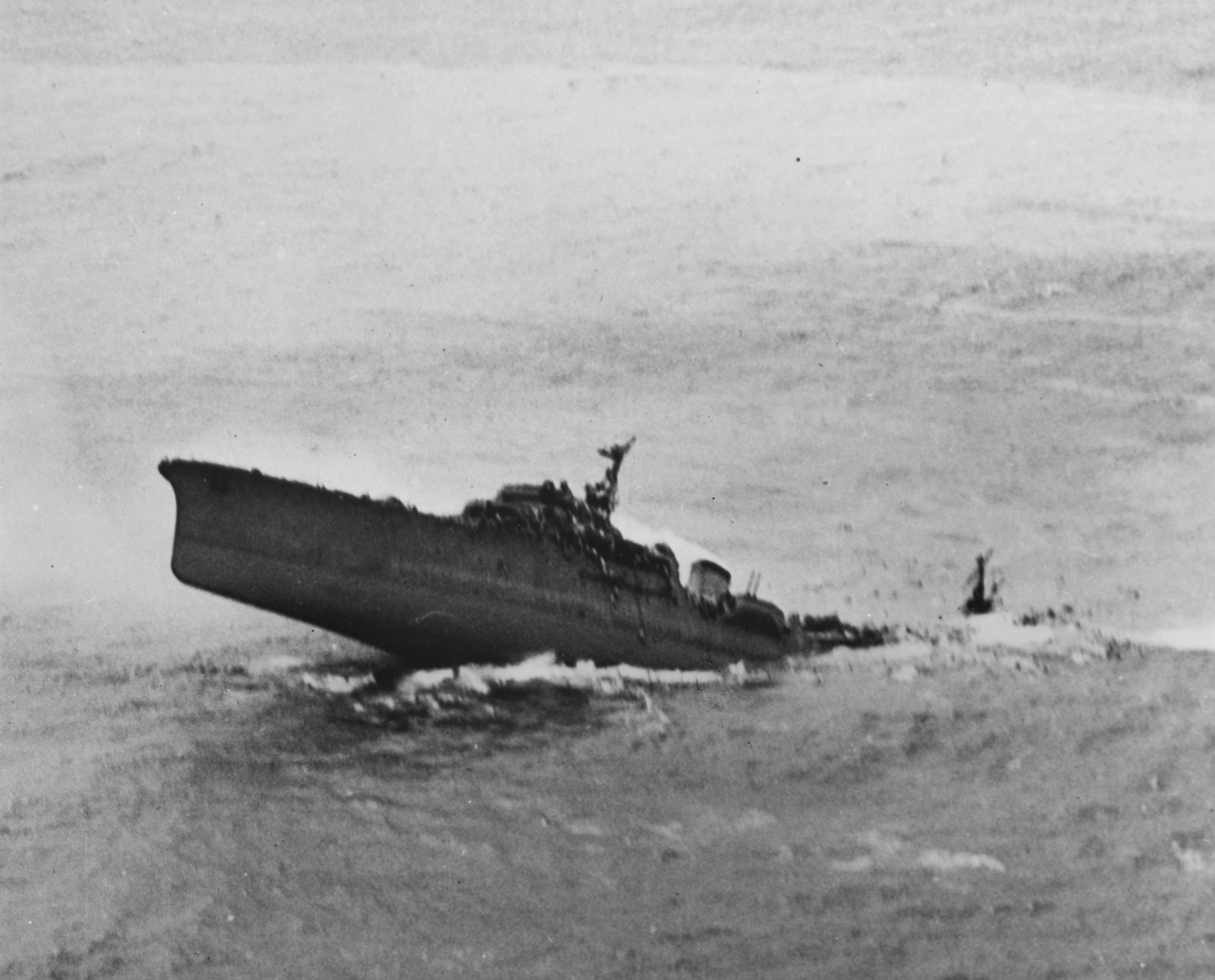
Kashii sinking on 12 January 1945

The return voyage with convoy HI-86 consisted of ten ships (4 tankers and 6 cargo ships) and the 101st Escort Group's five frigate CD kaibokans, which departed Singapore on 30 December 1944. On 12 January 1945, shortly after departing Qui Nhon Bay, Indochina, bombers from the U.S Task Force 38 comprising the aircraft carriers Lexington, Hornet, Hancock, Essex, Ticonderoga, Langley and San Jacinto attacked convoy HI-86 during the South China Sea raid, sinking most of the convoy's ships. Kashii was hit starboard amidships by a torpedo from a Grumman TBF Avenger, then a Curtiss SB2C Helldiver struck with two bombs aft, setting off the depth charge magazine. Kashii sank stern first at 13°50′N 109°20′E. Of Kashii's crew, 621 men went down with the ship and only 19 were rescued.

Kashii was removed from the Navy list on 20 March 1945.
