= USS McDermut (DD-262) =

Clemson-class destroyer

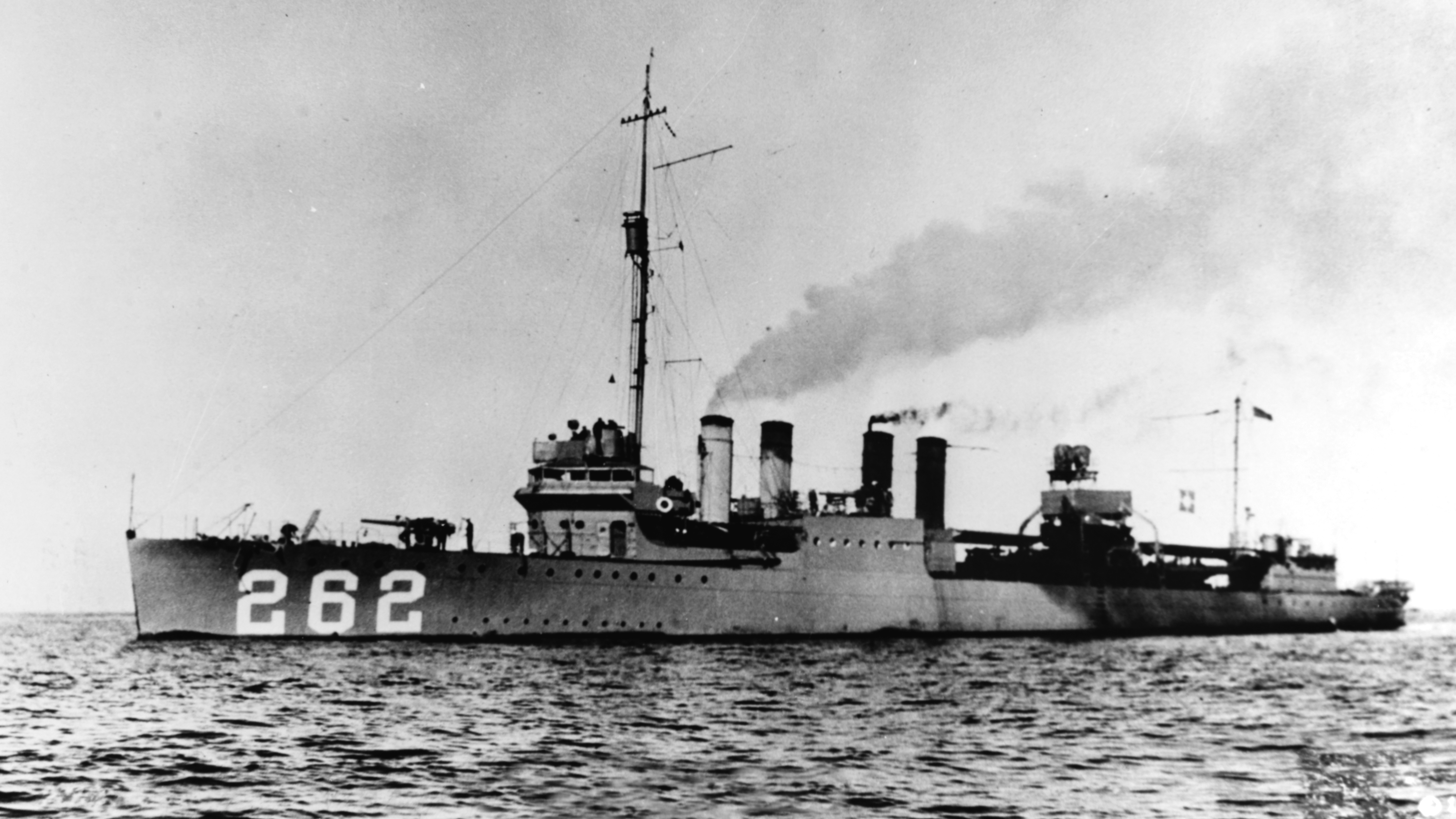

History

United States
- Namesake: David McDermut
- Builder: Bethlehem Shipbuilding Corporation, Squantum Victory Yard
- Laid down: 20 April 1918
- Launched: 6 August 1918
- Commissioned: 27 March 1919
- Decommissioned: 22 May 1929
- Stricken: 11 November 1931
- Fate: Sold for scrap, 25 February 1932

General characteristics
- Class & type: Clemson-class destroyer
- Displacement: 1,290 long tons (1,311 t) (standard); 1,389 long tons (1,411 t) (deep load)
- Length: 314 ft 4 in (95.8 m)
- Beam: 30 ft 11 in (9.42 m)
- Draught: 10 ft 3 in (3.1 m)
- Installed power: 27,000 shp (20,000 kW); 4 water-tube boilers
- Propulsion: 2 shafts, 2 steam turbines
- Speed: 35 knots (65 km/h; 40 mph) (design)
- Range: 2,500 nautical miles (4,600 km; 2,900 mi) at 20 knots (37 km/h; 23 mph) (design)
- Complement: 6 officers, 108 enlisted men
- Armament: 4 × single 4-inch (102 mm) guns; 2 × single 1-pounder AA guns or; 2 × single 3-inch (76 mm) guns; 4 × triple 21 inch (533 mm) torpedo tubes; 2 × depth charge rails

USS McDermut (DD-262) was a Clemson-class destroyer in service with the United States Navy from 1919 to 1929. She was scrapped in 1932.

== Description ==
The Clemson class was a repeat of the preceding Wickes class although more fuel capacity was added. The ships displaced 1,290 long tons (1,311 t) at standard load and 1,389 long tons (1,411 t) at deep load. They had an overall length of 314 feet 4 inches (95.8 m), a beam of 30 feet 11 inches (9.4 m) and a draught of 10 feet 3 inches (3.1 m). They had a crew of 6 officers and 108 enlisted men.

Performance differed radically between the ships of the class, often due to poor workmanship. The Clemson class was powered by two steam turbines, each driving one propeller shaft, using steam provided by four water-tube boilers. The turbines were designed to produce a total of 27,000 shaft horsepower (20,000 kW) intended to reach a speed of 35 knots (65 km/h; 40 mph). The ships carried a maximum of 371 long tons (377 t) of fuel oil which was intended gave them a range of 2,500 nautical miles (4,600 km; 2,900 mi) at 20 knots (37 km/h; 23 mph).

The ships were armed with four 4-inch (102 mm) guns in single mounts and were fitted with two 1-pounder guns for anti-aircraft defense. In many ships a shortage of 1-pounders caused them to be replaced by 3-inch (76 mm) guns. Their primary weapon, though, was their torpedo battery of a dozen 21 inch (533 mm) torpedo tubes in four triple mounts. They also carried a pair of depth charge rails. A "Y-gun" depth charge thrower was added to many ships.

== Construction and career ==
McDermut, named for David McDermut was laid down 20 April 1918 by Bethlehem Shipbuilding Corporation, Squantum, Massachusetts; launched 6 August 1918; sponsored by Mrs. Eugene G. Grace; and commissioned 27 March 1919. Assigned to the Atlantic Fleet, McDermut departed Boston, Massachusetts 28 May for Brest, France. She returned to the east coast 24 July only to sail for the west coast in the fall, arriving at San Diego, California the day before Christmas. During the next 8 and a half years, with few exceptions, she operated in the eastern Pacific, steaming along the coast from Panama to Canada, and among the Hawaiian Islands. In 1924, she had a small part in the silent film The Navigator, starring Buster Keaton and Kathryn McGuire.

In 1924 and 1927 she transited the Panama Canal for abbreviated duties in the Caribbean and Gulf of Mexico and in 1925 took part in a good will visit to Samoa, Australia, and New Zealand. On 22 March 1927 McDermut, returning from a cruise to Panama, arrived at the San Diego Destroyer Base, where she decommissioned 22 May 1929. Struck from the Naval Register 11 November 1931, she was scrapped and sold, 25 February 1932, in accordance with the terms of the London Treaty for Naval Disarmament.
