= Japanese destroyer Yamagumo (1937) =

Asashio-class destroyer

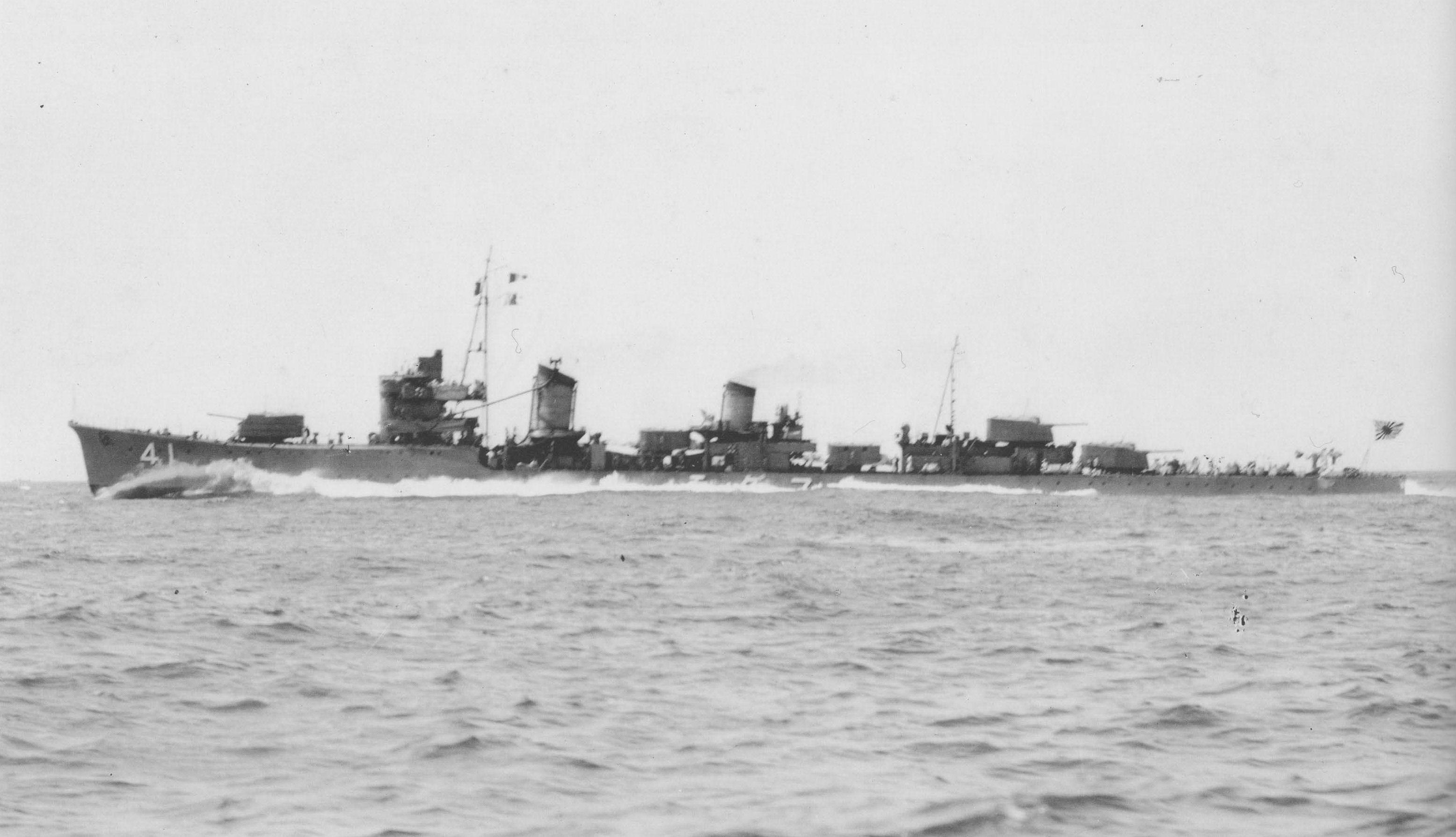
- Yamagumo underway on 15 September 1939.

History

Empire of Japan
- Name: Yamagumo
- Ordered: 1934 Maru-2 Program
- Builder: Fujinagata Shipyards
- Laid down: 4 November 1936
- Launched: 24 July 1937
- Commissioned: 15 January 1938
- Stricken: 10 January 1945
- Fate: Sunk in action, 25 October 1944

General characteristics
- Class & type: Asashio-class destroyer
- Displacement: 2,370 long tons (2,408 t)
- Length: 111 m (364 ft) pp; 115 m (377 ft 4 in)waterline; 118.3 m (388 ft 1 in) OA
- Beam: 10.3 m (33 ft 10 in)
- Draft: 3.7 m (12 ft 2 in)
- Propulsion: 2-shaft geared turbine, 3 boilers, 50,000 shp (37,285 kW)
- Speed: 35 knots (40 mph; 65 km/h)
- Range: 5,700 nmi (10,600 km) at 10 kn (19 km/h); 960 nmi (1,780 km) at 34 kn (63 km/h)
- Complement: 200
- Armament: 6 × 12.7 cm/50 Type 3 DP guns; up to 28 × Type 96 AA guns; up to 4 × Type 93 AA guns; 8 × 24 in (610 mm) torpedo tubes; 36 depth charges

Yamagumo (山雲, Mountain Cloud) was the sixth of ten Asashio-class destroyers built for the Imperial Japanese Navy in the mid-1930s under the Circle Two Supplementary Naval Expansion Program (Maru Ni Keikaku). Immediately into the war, Yamagumo was crippled by striking a Japanese laid mine and spent nearly two years under repair and demoted to local patrol duties around mainland Japan. In September of 1943, Yamagumo was finally pressed back into combat, and later that November sank the submarine USS Sculpin. Yamagumo was torpedoed and sunk by the destroyer USS McDermut at the battle of Leyte Gulf, 25 October 1944.

== History ==
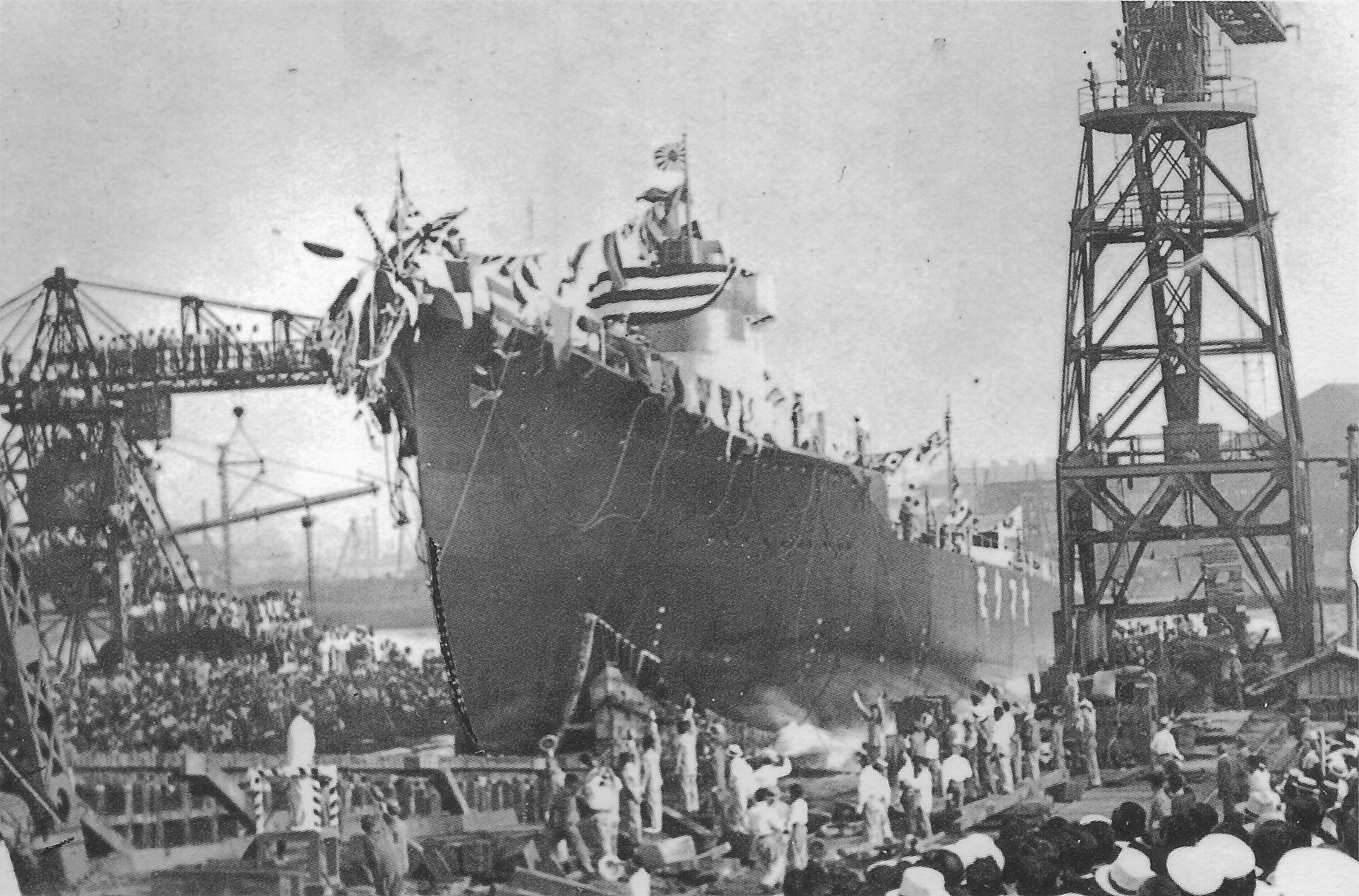
The ceremonial launch of Yamagumo at Fujinagata Shipyards, 24 July 1937

The Asashio-class destroyers were larger and more capable that the preceding Shiratsuyu-class, as Japanese naval architects were no longer constrained by the provisions of the London Naval Treaty. These light cruiser-sized vessels were designed to take advantage of Japan’s lead in torpedo technology, and to accompany the Japanese main striking force and in both day and night attacks against the United States Navy as it advanced across the Pacific Ocean, according to Japanese naval strategic projections. Despite being one of the most powerful classes of destroyers in the world at the time of their completion, none survived the Pacific War.

Yamagumo, built at the Fujinagata Shipyards was laid down on 4 November 1936, launched on 24 July 1937 and commissioned on 15 January 1938. Upon completion, Yamagumo was assigned to destroyer division 41. Later that December, Yamagumo joined many Asashio class destroyers in carrying out repairs and refits to her steam turbines after the class proved to suffer from a faulty propulsion system - a flaw which was corrected during refit - before continuing the typical peacetime service. In November of 1939, destroyer division 41 was rebranded to destroyer division 9 (Asagumo, Yamagumo, Natsugumo, Minegumo) and embarked on patrol duties and training missions throughout the rest of their peacetime career.

== Operational history ==
At the time of the attack on Pearl Harbor, 7 December 1941, Yamagumo, served as rear admiral Sueto Hirose's flagship of the 3rd Special Attack Force in the invasion of the Philippines and covered landings at Camiguin Island and Lingayen. However, her wartime career was immediately brought to a halt when Yamagumo accidentally led an invasion convoy into a Japanese laid minefield in the Lingayen Gulf. Alongside many troop transport being disabled, a friendly mine struck Yamagumo amidships and flooded her engineering spaces, disabling the destroyer. Yamagumo was taken under tow by the gunship Minamiura Maru while Hirose transferred his flag to the torpedo boat Manazuru. Yamagumo was moored alongside the repair ship Yamabiko Maru to be patched up before being towed to Hong Kong from 5-9 February 1942 for further repairs. On 1 April, Yamagumo departed Hong Kong under her own power for mainland Japan and arrived at Yokosuka 5 days later, where she remained docked for repairs until 30 September.

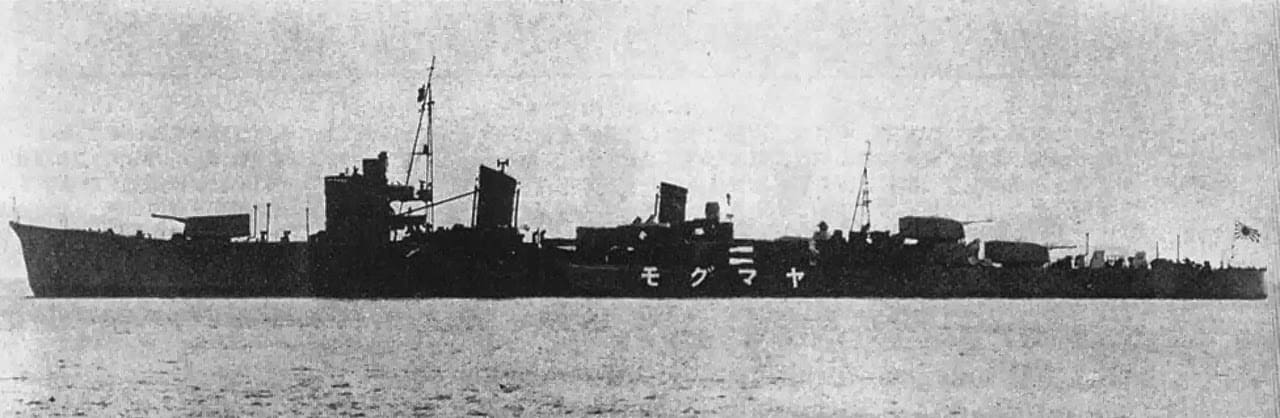
Yamagumo anchored off Fujinagata after commissioning, 17 January 1938

On 7 October, the destroyer Hagikaze - which had been crippled by a bomb to her Y turret earlier that August - had broken down on the way to Yokosuka after originally maintaining 6 knots, so Yamagumo departed harbor to assist the crippled vessel. She located Hagikaze, attached cables, and towed her to Yokosuka where they arrived the next day. For the following months, Yamagumo operated in local waters as a security destroyer. In December, Yamagumo successfully left Japan for the first and only time since striking that mine when she escorted a troop covoy to Truk and back. On 8 February, Yamagumo attempted to escort the military-serviced ocean liner Tatsuta Maru to Truk, but underway Tatsuta Maru was struck by four torpedoes from the submarine USS Tarpon and sunk with the loss of all 1,223 troops and 198 crew members. Yamagumo turn around and attempted to rescue survivors, but Tatsuta Maru vanished nearly instantly with no trace of anyone in the water, not helped by bad weather and the darkness of the night. Consequently, Yamagumo returned to Japan in failure for more local patrol duties.

On 20 August, Yamagumo embarked on training duties for several weeks after, and on 15 September Yamagumo was finally assigned to destroyer division 4 (Maikaze, Nowaki) and departed Yokosuka for Shanghai. Yamagumo escorted a troop convoy to Rabaul from 24 September to 5 October, then escorted a troop convoy from Truk to Shanghai from 11-18 October, then back to Truk from the 21st to the 28th. On 3 November, Yamagumo was finally united with destroyer division 4 in the flesh and joined Maikaze and Nowaki in escorting a convoy to Rabaul, but the mission was cancelled due to the bombing of Rabaul on the 5th. The trio of destroyers instead escorted a troop convoy to Rabaul from the 9th to the 12th, before partaking in a troop transport run back to Truk from the 13th to 15th.

=== Sinking of USS Sculpin ===
On 18 November, Yamagumo departed Truk with the destroyer Wakatsuki to escort the training cruiser Kashima, the submarine tender Chōgei, and the armed merchant cruiser Gokoku Maru on a return journey to mainland Japan. They sailed smoothy for the day, but later that night their group was detected by the radar of the patrolling submarine USS Sculpin. Sculpin enacted an end run on the surface to close for an attack later that morning. However, as she was closing into the line of fire, Yamagumo spotted a surfaced enemy submarine at 6:40 and sailed for a counterattack as Sculpin attempted to crash dive. Yamagumo dropped a first pattern of depth charges that failed to reach their target, but her second pattern destroyed her depth gauge. Because of this, when Sculpin attempted to rise to periscope depth several hours later, she accidentally surfaced. Yamagumo had stayed in the surrounding area to confirm a sinking and immediately spotted Sculpin and pounced on the target. She dropped 18 depth charges on the submarine as she attempted to crash dive again which cracked Sculpin's hull and crippled her depth control, and as the submarine became more noticeable on sonar another wave of depth charges destroyed Sculpin's own sonar.

Sculpin surfaced to avoid sinking and desperately engaged Yamagumo with her 3-inch (76 mm) deck gun, but the destroyer responded with her own main battery. A 5-inch (127 mm) shell immediately struck the conning tower and killed her entire bridge staff before gunfire killed her deck crew. The surviving Lieutenant George Brown ordered the crew to scuttle Sculpin. Captain Cromwell went down with the ship so his knowledge of the planned Tarawa invasion would die with him After a 10 minute gunfight, Sculpin sank with the loss of 11 men.

42 survivors were rescued and taken as prisoners-of-war (POWs), then were transferred to the escort carrier Chūyō, until she was sunk by the submarine USS Sailfish, in which 20 out of 21 went down with the ship. Only 1 was rescued and returned to Japan along with the other 21 survivors aboard Unyō to serve as POWs until the end of the war.

Subsequently, she was assigned to escort the tanker Nippon Maru in the Marshall Islands area. In December, she returned to Japan with Kongō and Chōgei, returning to Truk in the company of the battleship Yamato at the end of the year.

On 1 January 1944 she suffered light damage when strafed during a Tokyo Express troop transport mission to Kavieng. She was escort for the tanker Kokuyo Maru in January, and made three additional troop transport runs in the Solomon Islands area in February. On 23 February, she returned to Yokosuka together with the transport Asaka Maru. While at Yokosuka, she was overhauled, and one of her main gun turrets was replaced by two triple Type 96 AA guns.

In early April, she escorted the aircraft carrier Zuihō to Guam, and back to Kure. In May, she escorted the carriers Jun'yō, Hiyō and Ryūhō to Tawitawi, and the battleships Yamato and Musashi to Biak. During the Battle of the Philippine Sea of 10–20 June 1944, she was part of Admiral Takatsugu Jōjima’s “Force B”, but did not see combat.

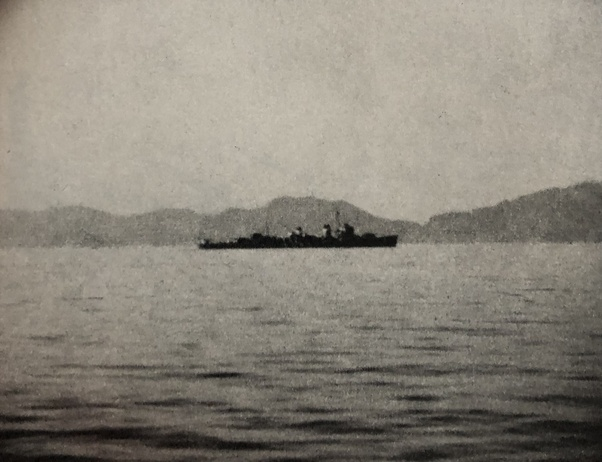
Yamagumo moored in Sukumo Bay, 1940

During the Battle of Leyte Gulf of 22–25 October 1944 she was part of Admiral Shōji Nishimura’s “Southern Force”. In the Battle of Surigao Strait, she was hit by torpedoes fired by the destroyer USS McDermut, and exploded, sinking at position 10°25′N 125°23′E. There were only two survivors. She was removed from the navy list on 10 January 1945.

== Rediscovery ==
Yamagumo's wreck was discovered along with sister Michishio on 27 November 2017 by Microsoft co-founder Paul Allen's research ship RV Petrel. Both wrecks are 1 mile (1.6 km) apart in 380 ft (117 m) of water. Both wrecks were heavily encrusted with marine growth, which combined with their close proximity, made it impossible to distinguish the two ships.
