= Japanese submarine tender Chōgei =

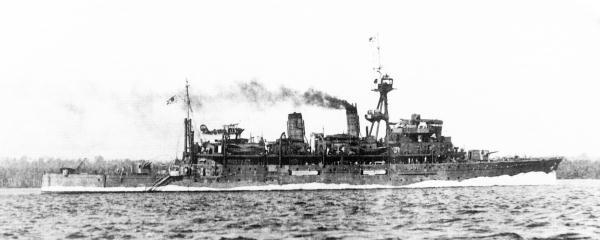
- Chōgei in 1923

History

Empire of Japan
- Name: Chōgei
- Ordered: 1923 Fiscal Year
- Builder: Mitsubishi Nagasaki Shipyards
- Laid down: 11 March 1922
- Launched: 24 March 1924
- Completed: 20 August 1924
- Out of service: 30 July 1945
- Stricken: 5 October 1945
- Reinstated: October 1945 – August 1946 (reparation transport)
- Fate: Scrapped 1947

General characteristics initial
- Class & type: Jingei-class submarine tender
- Displacement: 5,160 long tons (5,243 t) standard; 7,678 long tons (7,801 t) trial
- Length: 125.40 m (411 ft 5 in) overall; 123.00 m (403 ft 7 in) waterline
- Beam: 16.215 m (53 ft 2.4 in)
- Draught: 6.283 m (20 ft 7.4 in)
- Installed power: 7,500 shp (5,600 kW)
- Propulsion: 2 × Parsons geared turbines; 5 × Kampon coal/oil-fired boilers, 2-shafts
- Speed: 16 knots (18 mph; 30 km/h)
- Range: 10,400 nmi (19,300 km) at 14 kn (16 mph; 26 km/h)
- Capacity: 40 torpedoes, 1700 tons of fuel
- Complement: 399
- Armament: 4 × 14 cm/50 3rd Year Type naval guns; 2 × 8 cm/40 3rd Year Type naval guns; 2 × 7.7 mm machine guns
- Aircraft carried: 1927-1942; 1 × float plane
- Aviation facilities: derrick and deck

General characteristics after 1935
- Displacement: 6,240 long tons (6,340 t) standard; 8,288 long tons (8,421 t) trial
- Length: 123.47 m (405 ft 1 in) waterline
- Beam: 17.15 m (56 ft 3 in)
- Draught: 6.60 m (21 ft 8 in)
- Speed: 16.0 knots (18.4 mph; 29.6 km/h)
- Electronic warfare & decoys: 1 × 21-Gō early warning radar
- Armament: 4 × 14 cm/50 3rd Year Type naval guns; 2 × 8 cm/40 3rd Year Type naval guns; 2 × Type 96 25 mm AA guns; 4 × Type 93 13 mm AA guns

Chōgei (長鯨, Long Whale), was the second and final vessel of the Jingei-class submarine tenders operated by the Imperial Japanese Navy, from the 1920s through World War II. Along with her sister ship Jingei, she was the first purpose-built submarine tender in the Imperial Japanese Navy.

== Background ==
Under the Eight-eight fleet plan, the Imperial Japanese Navy planned to acquire 100 submarines for long-distance scouting operations, which would also be used to conduct attrition warfare against any enemy fleet approaching Japan. Chōgei was intended to serve as a flagship for the Submarine Division Commander and as a depot ship for the nine submarines in a submarine division.

Initially, Chōgei was planned as a 14,500-ton vessel; however, her specifications were scaled down to 8,500-tons due to restrictions imposed by the Washington Naval Treaty.

== Design ==
Chōgei was built by Mitsubishi Yards in Nagasaki, and the contractor was given an unusually free hand in her design. In order to keep costs to a minimum, the basic design of her hull was adapted from that of a standard civilian merchant vessel, of which Mitsubishi had considerable experience in building. Her coal/oil-fired boilers were taken from the cancelled Tosa-class battleship project. As Mitsubishi was also working on the Katori-class cruiser at the same time, many design innovations that had been developed by Mitsubishi engineers were shared between the two classes, and as a result, the Katori-class cruisers came bear a superficial resemblance to the Jingei-class submarine tenders.

== Operational career ==
Chōgei was laid down on 11 March 1922, launched on 24 March 1924 and completed on 20 August 1924. Initially assigned to the Kure Naval District, she was assigned to the new Second Submarine Division under the IJN 2nd Fleet. She briefly served as an escort vessel during the First Shanghai Incident of 1932, and was assigned to the IJN 1st Fleet from November 1933.

Following the Tomozuru Incident of 13 March 1934, all ships of the Japanese Navy were subject to inspection and renovation of design flaws that would put the ship in danger of capsizing. Renovations were begun on Chōgei in November 1934 at the Sasebo Naval Arsenal to equip the vessel with new ballast tanks and bilge pumps. As the Jingei-class submarine tenders were unable to support the new Kaidai-class submarines, they were reassigned to the Training Fleet around this time, and their duties as submarine tenders were taken up by the new Kuma-class cruisers.

After the Marco Polo Bridge Incident of 7 July 1937, Chōgei was assigned to transport troops of the IJA 10th Division to northern China, as well as a thousand troops of the 1st Special Naval Landing Force. On arrival at Port Arthur, word was received that Japanese positions in Shanghai were in danger of being overrun, so Chōgei quickly reembarked the same troops and transported them to Shanghai. Aside from duty as a troop transport, shuttling between Shanghai and Port Arthur, Chōgei took no further combat role in the Second Sino-Japanese War.

On 15 November 1940, in preparation for the coming conflict with the United States, both Jingei-class ships were returned to active combat status, replacing Takasaki and Tsuruguzaki, which were then converted to aircraft carriers. Chōgei was assigned as flagship of the 2nd Submarine Squadron, IJN 6th Fleet, and was equipped with a Kawanishi E7K2 reconnaissance floatplane. However, in October, Chōgei was reassigned directly to the Combined Fleet as flagship for Submarine Division 6. Submarine Division 6 was subsequently reassigned to the IJN 3rd Fleet at the time of the attack on Pearl Harbor.

Following the start of the Pacific War, Chōgei was based at Davao in the Philippines and was assigned a patrol area stretching to the Celebes, and south to the Flores Sea and Torres Straits. She was based at Staring-baai in February 1942 and was recalled to Japan in March. On 6 May 1942, Chōgei was involved in a collision with the submarine I-153 off the coast of Shikoku, which required repairs until the end of June. She was then based at Kure Naval Arsenal.

On 7 November 1942, Chōgei relieved Jingei as submarine tender for the IJN 8th Fleet based in Rabaul. The Japanese base at Rabaul came under attack by American forces on 12 October 1943, but Chōgei was undamaged. She suffered minor damage due to strafing during the subsequent attack on 2 November 1943, and none during the third raid of 5 November 1943. However, the repeated air raids led the Imperial Japanese Navy to order the withdrawal of Chōgei back to Japan.

On 18 November 1943, north of Truk, Chōgei and her escorts were attacked by the American submarine USS Sculpin, which was sunk by the destroyer Yamagumo

Chōgei returned to front-line combat status on 1 January 1944 as flagship of Submarine Squadron 11, under the IJN 6th Fleet. In summer, her main guns were replaced with 18 Type 96 25-mm antiaircraft guns. She subsequently made two roundtrips to Okinawa as a transport for supplies and reinforcements in August and September 1944.

On 1 January 1945, Chōgei was assigned to the Maizuru Naval District. On 30 July 1945, Maizuru came under attack by a combined Royal Navy / United States Navy air raid. Chōgei took a direct hit which destroyed her bridge.

Following the surrender of Japan, Chōgei was officially struck from the navy list on 5 October 1945. However, her bridge was repaired, and she was placed back into service with the Allied Reparation Service, transporting Japanese military and civilian personnel from former Japanese territories back to the Japanese home islands. She made a total of eight round trip voyages to Korea, Taiwan, China, Rabaul and Guam in the first half of 1946. On 15 July 1946, Chōgei put into Sasebo, Nagasaki for repairs. However, she was deemed not worth repairing, and was removed from service on 15 August 1946. From September 1946 to August 1947, she was scrapped at the Hitachi Shipbuilding Yards in Onomichi, Hiroshima.

== Gallery ==
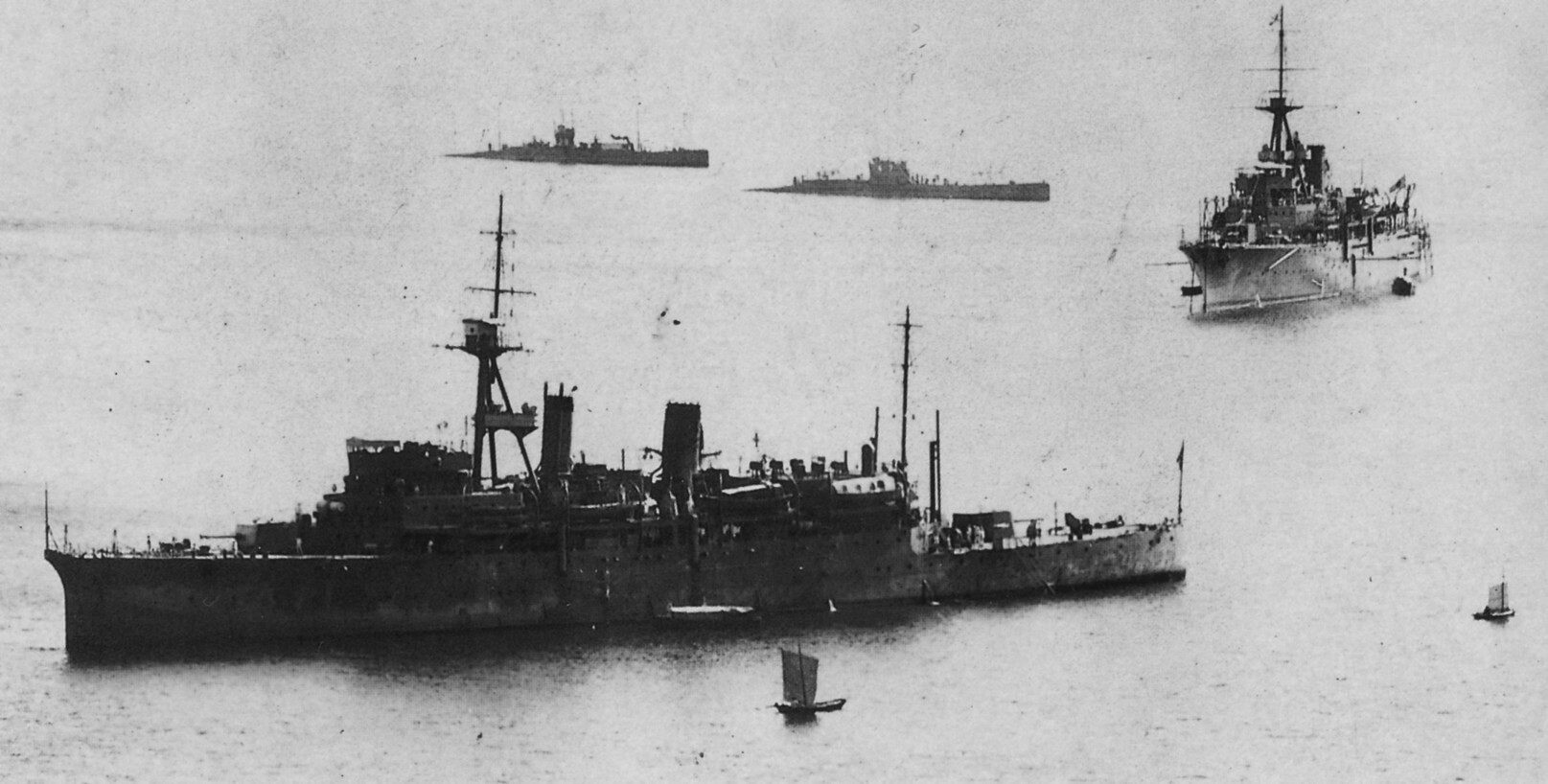
With Jingei 1924

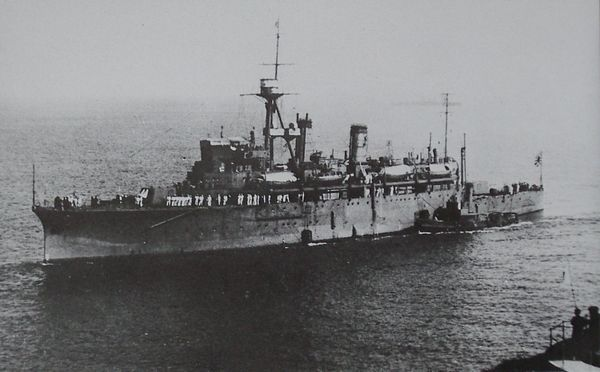
In 1926

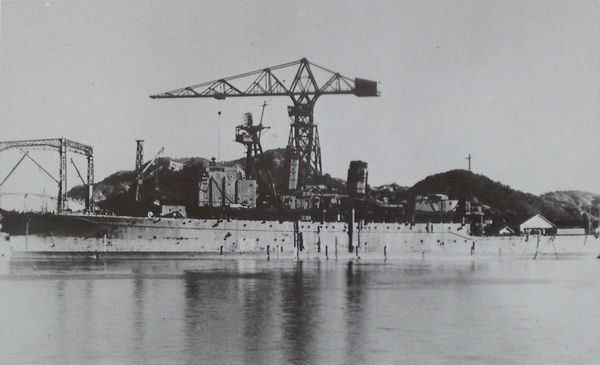
In 1946
