= Katori-class cruiser =

1939 class of Japanese cruisers

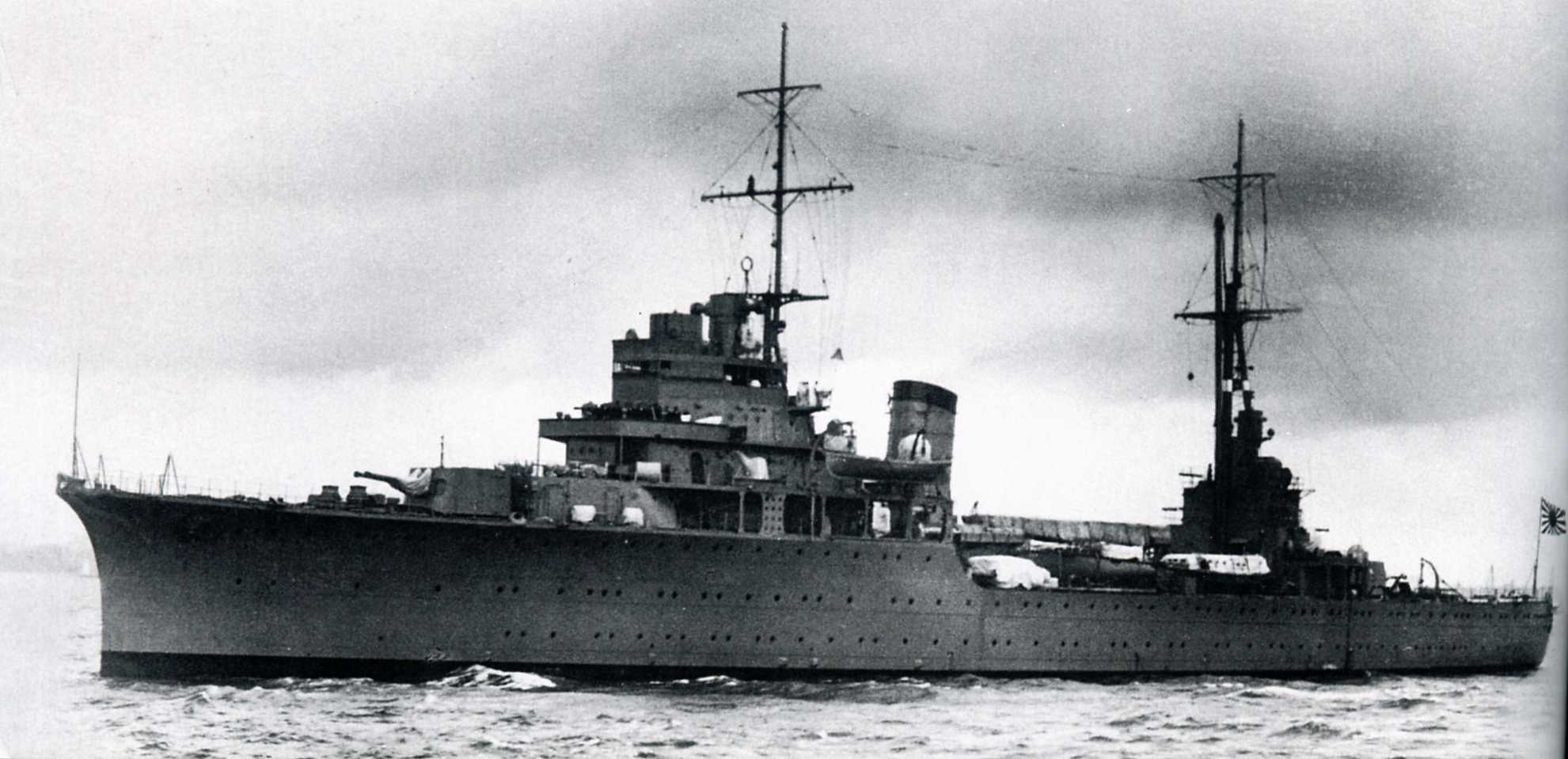
- Katori

Class overview
- Name: Katori class
- Builders: Mitsubishi Heavy Industries, Yokohama
- Operators: Imperial Japanese Navy
- Cost: 6,600,000 JPY (Katori and Kashima); 7,200,000 JPY (Kashii)
- Built: 1938–1940
- In commission: 1940–1945
- Planned: 4
- Completed: 3
- Canceled: 1
- Lost: 2
- Retired: 1

General characteristics
- Type: Cruiser
- Displacement: 5,890 long tons (5,985 t) normal; 6,180 long tons (6,279 t) full load
- Length: 129.77 m (425 ft 9 in)
- Beam: 15.95 m (52 ft 4 in)
- Draught: 5.75 m (18 ft 10 in)
- Propulsion: 2-shaft geared turbines, plus diesel motors; 3 Kampon boilers; 8,000 shp (6,000 kW)
- Speed: 18 knots (21 mph; 33 km/h)
- Range: 9,000 nautical miles (17,000 km) at 10 knots (19 km/h)
- Complement: 315 + 275 midshipmen
- Armament: 4 × 140 mm (5.5 in)/50 cal. guns (2×2); 2 × 127 mm (5 in)/40 cal. AA guns (1×2); 4 × Type 96 AA guns (later increased to 30); 8 × 13.2 mm (0.52 in) AA guns; 4 × 533 mm (21 in) torpedo tubes (2×2)
- Armour: Gun turrets: 10 mm (0 in); Conning tower: 10 mm (0 in)
- Aircraft carried: 1 × floatplane
- Aviation facilities: 1 catapult

The Katori-class training cruisers (香取型練習巡洋艦, Katori-gata renshū-jun'yōkan) were originally ordered by the Imperial Japanese Navy (IJN) to serve as training ships in the 1937 and 1939 Supplementary Naval budgets. During the Pacific War, they were used as administrative flagships for various fleets, such as submarine command and control, and to command escort squadrons. The ships were upgraded as the war progressed with additional anti-aircraft guns and depth charges.

== Design ==
Originally ordered by the IJN in the 1937 and 1939 Supplementary Naval budgets, the Katori-class cruisers were purpose-designed to replace the aging armored cruisers in the officer training role, and as such differed from other IJN cruisers in several aspects. Built to commercial standards to minimize cost, the Katori class had a lower length-to-beam ratio than was usual for cruisers, giving the ships greater initial stability for trainees unfamiliar with lives at sea. Unusually for IJN ships, the Katori class had mixed steam turbine/diesel propulsion, intended to maximize the ships' instructional value rather than speed: even at a combined 6,000 kW (8,000 shp) the maximum speed was only 33 km/h (18 kn), too slow for conventional cruiser duties.

The main armament of each ship was four 140 mm (5.5 in) guns in two twin-gun turrets, the same type used on the light cruiser Yūbari, in "A" and "Y" positions. These were supplemented by a pair of 127 mm (5 in) AA guns in "X" position, two pairs of 25 mm AA guns, and two pairs of 533 mm (21.0 in) torpedoes. Four single 50 mm saluting guns were also carried. A floatplane could be launched by a catapult mounted amidships.

== Ships ==
Katori (香取)
Built by Mitsubishi Heavy Industries at Yokohama shipyard. Commissioned 20 April 1940. Assigned to the Sixth Fleet, based at Kwajalein. On 1 February 1942, was attacked by torpedo-bombers from USS Enterprise, and sustained damage. Repaired at Yokosuka. During the American attack on Truk on 17–18 February 1944, was attacked by aircraft and hit by a torpedo. Several hours later was attacked again, and sunk by 16-inch (406mm) shells from USS Iowa (BB-61). No survivors were recovered. Struck from the Navy List 31 March 1944.
Kashima (鹿島)
Built by Mitsubishi Heavy Industries at Yokohama. Commissioned 31 May 1940. From December 1941, flagship of the Fourth Fleet based at Truk. In 1942 covered the landings at Rabaul and Kavieng, Tulagi and Port Moresby, Rabaul, and New Guinea. In late 1943 reassigned to the Kure Training Division. In dry-dock from November 1943 until January 1944. Served as a transport ship, and modified for the anti-submarine role in late 1944. Struck from the Navy List on 5 October 1945. After the war used as a repatriation transport. Scrapped 1947.
Kashii (香椎)
Built by Mitsubishi Heavy Industries at Yokohama. Commissioned 15 July 1941. Assigned to the Southern Expeditionary Fleet in 1941. In 1942 participated in the invasion of North Sumatra and Burma. In 1943 made transport runs carrying troops and supplies. In 1944 modified for anti-submarine warfare. On 12 January 1945, was attacked by US aircraft, was hit by a torpedo, then two bombs, and sank. Only 19 of 621 aboard were saved.
Kashihara (橿原)
Built by Mitsubishi Heavy Industries at Yokohama. Laid down on 23 August 1941, construction stopped on 6 November 1941, later scrapped.

== Bibliography ==
- Lacroix, Eric & Wells II, Linton (1997). Japanese Cruisers of the Pacific War. Annapolis, Maryland: Naval Institute Press. ISBN 0-87021-311-3.
- Senshi Sōsho Vol.31, Naval armaments and war preparation (1), "Until November 1941", Asagumo Simbun (Japan), November 1969
