= Italian submarine Bagnolini =

At least two ships of the Italian Navy have been named in honour of Alpino Attilo Bagnolini and may refer to either Alpino Bagnolini or Attilio Bagnolini

- Italian submarine Alpino Bagnolini, a Liuzzi-class submarine launched in 1939 and renamed UIT-22 when seized by Germany in 1943. She was sunk in 1944.
- Italian submarine Attilio Bagnolini, a Toti-class submarine launched in 1967 and decommissioned in 1991.
