= Action of 11 January 1944 =

Minor naval action between the Japanese and British in WW II

- Part of the Pacific theatre of the Second World War
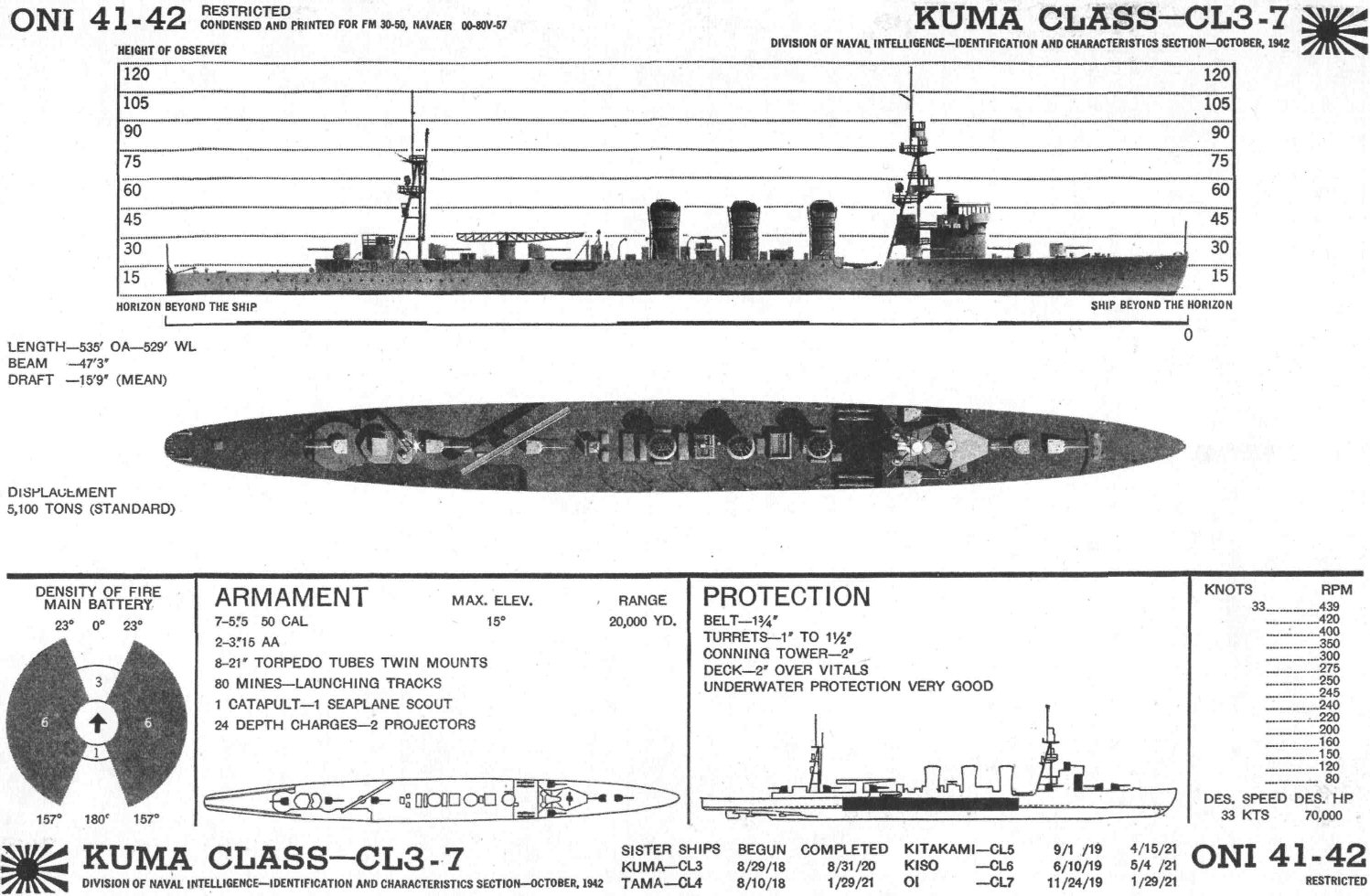
- Plan of the Japanese light cruiser Kuma
Date	11 January 1944
Location	10 nmi (19 km) off Penang, Malaysia, Indian Ocean 05°26′N 99°52′E
Result	British victory

Belligerents
United Kingdom	Japan

Commanders and leaders
Leslie Bennington	Captain Sugino Shuichi

Strength
Submarine HMS Tally-Ho	Light cruiser Kuma; Destroyer Uranami

Casualties and losses
None	Kuma sunk 138 killed

The action of 11 January 1944 was a minor naval action that resulted in the sinking of the light cruiser Kuma of the Imperial Japanese Navy by the Royal Navy submarine HMS Tally-Ho. Kuma was being escorted by the destroyer Uranami about 10 nmi (19 km; 12 mi) north-west of Penang, Malaya.

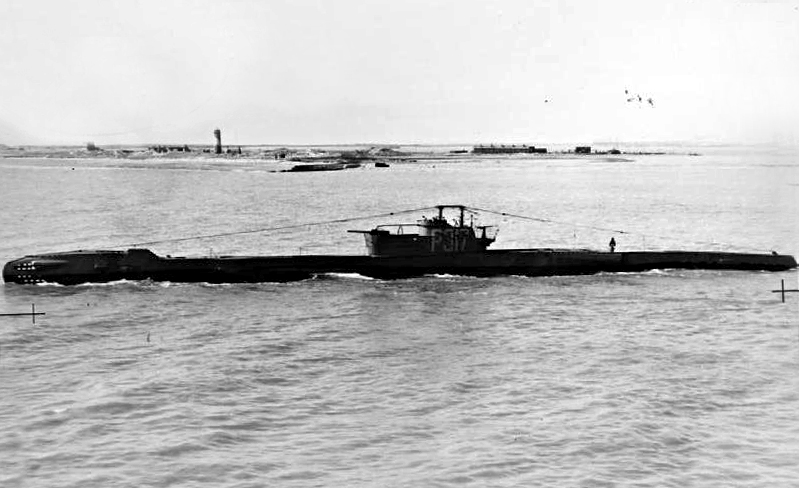
HMS Tally-Ho

Tally-Ho was patrolling from her base at Trincomalee, Ceylon searching for Japanese vessels and on 9 January, sighted the Japanese light cruiser Kuma off Penang. Kuma was on anti-submarine warfare exercises. She was flanked by destroyers and Tally-Ho could not get within range. She was able to plot the Japanese route in and out of Penang and to take up a suitable position to intercept the cruiser.

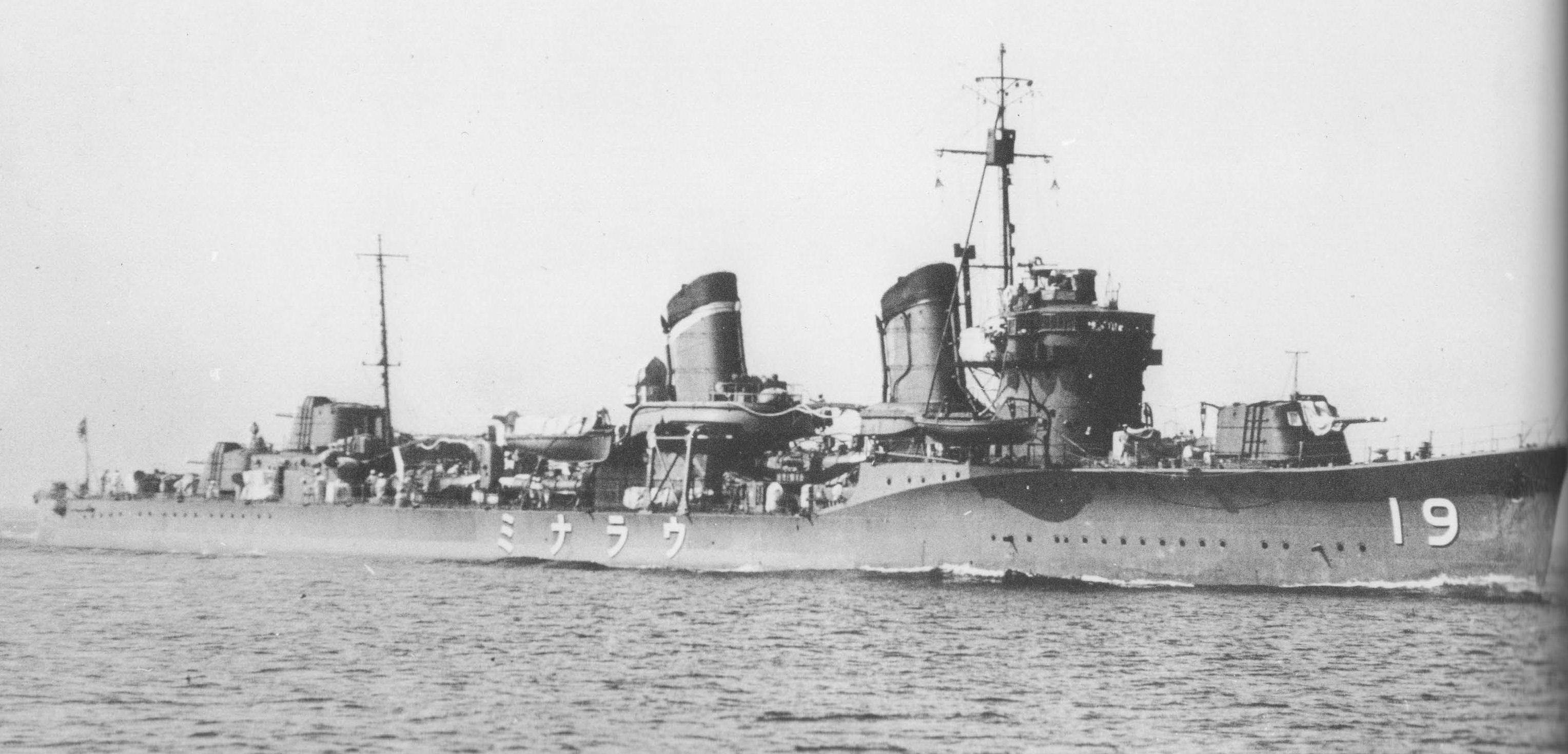
Imperial Japanese Navy destroyer Uranami, the second Japanese destroyer to bear that name

On the morning of 11 January, Tally-Ho's commander, Leslie Bennington, spotted a Mitsubishi F1M2 Pete floatplane flying westwards along the route on which the cruiser that had been sighted on 9 January was to be expected. It was felt that this heralded the approach of the cruiser. Just before 09:00, the officer of the watch sighted the masts of the cruiser on the port bow. Kuma was escorted by the Uranami. Whilst 10 nmi (19 km; 12 mi) north-west of Penang, at midday, Bennington fired a seven-torpedo salvo from 1,900 yd (1,700 m). Kumas's lookouts soon spotted the torpedo wakes and Sugino shifted his rudder hard over. Kuma was hit starboard aft by two torpedoes. Bennington decided to head toward the shallows along the shore. The destroyer Uranami attacked with 18 depth charges but all missed the submarine. A fire raged on board the Kuma and she soon began to sink by the stern. As she sank, her depth charges detonated. Uranami then picked up the survivors, including Sugino, while 138 crewmen were lost. After his success, Bennington managed to slip away and returned to Trincomalee.

== Bibliography ==
- D'Albas, Andrieu (1965). Death of a Navy: Japanese Naval Action in World War II. Devin-Adair Pub. ISBN 0-8159-5302-X.
- Dull, Paul S. (1978). A Battle History of the Imperial Japanese Navy, 1941-1945. Naval Institute Press. ISBN 0-87021-097-1.
- Parshall, Jon; Bob Hackett; Sander Kingsepp; Allyn Nevitt. "Imperial Japanese Navy Page (Combinedfleet.com)". Archived from the original on 13 June 2006.
- Trenowden, Ian (1978). Operations Most Secret: S.O.E., the Malayan Theatre. William Kimber & Co Ltd. ISBN 978-0-7183-0036-4.
- Trenowden, Ian (2012). Operations Most Secret: S.O.E., the Malayan Theatre, Foreword by Earl Mountbatten of Burma (ebook, kindle, kobo). Mark Trenowden. ASIN B009STIHDG.
