= USS Benham (DD-397) =

Benham-class destroyer

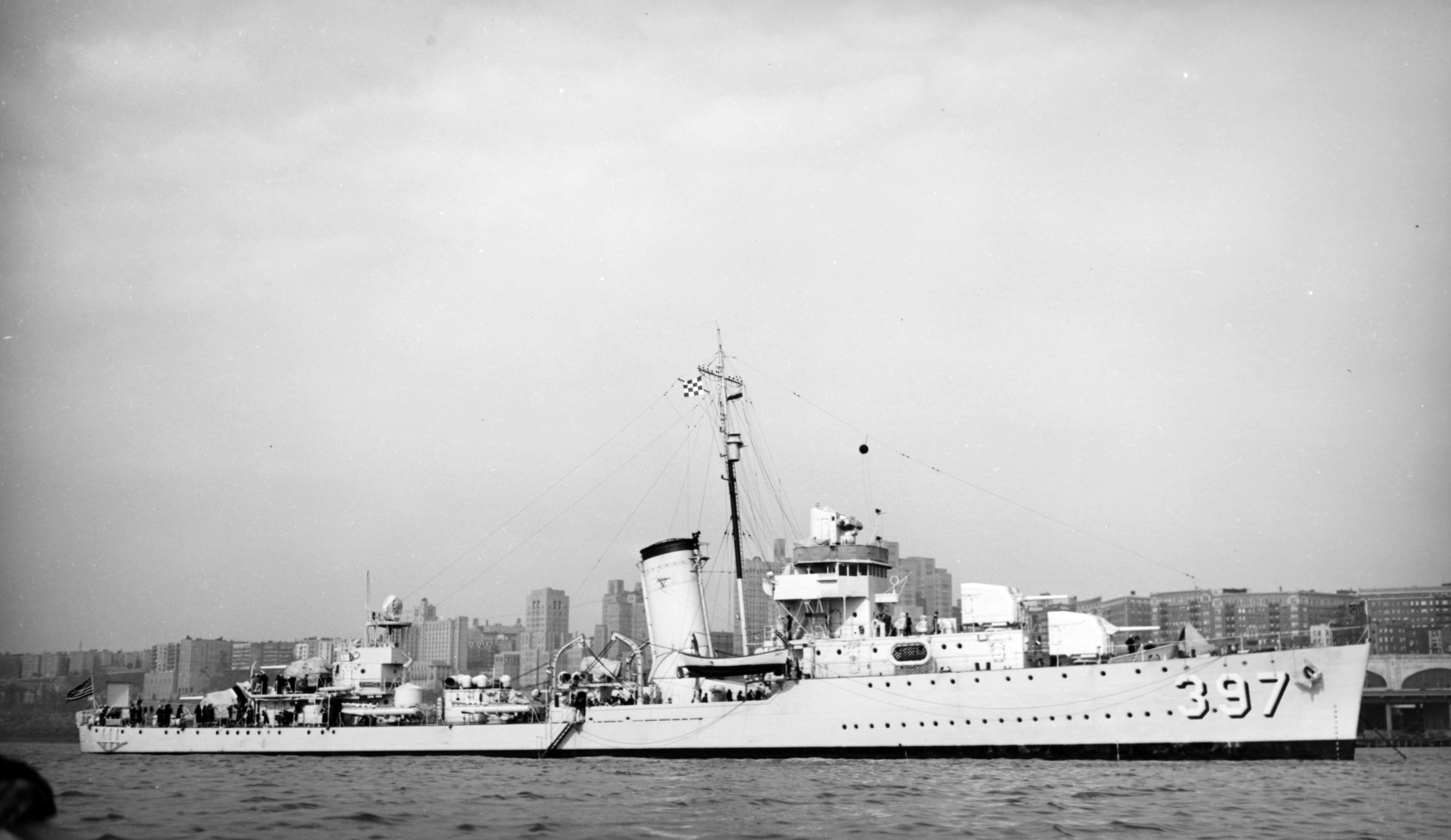
- USS Benham (DD-397)

History

United States
- Name: Benham
- Namesake: Andrew Ellicot Kennedy Benham
- Builder: Federal Shipbuilding and Dry Dock Company
- Laid down: 1 September 1936
- Launched: 16 April 1938
- Commissioned: 2 February 1939
- Honors and awards: 5 × battle stars
- Fate: Scuttled following a torpedo hit from the Japanese destroyer Uranami during the Battle of Guadalcanal, 15 November 1942

General characteristics
- Class & type: Benham-class destroyer
- Displacement: 2,250 tons (full)
- Length: 340 ft 9 in (103.86 m)
- Beam: 35 ft 6 in (10.82 m)
- Draft: 12 ft 10 in (3.91 m)
- Propulsion: 50,000 shp (37,000 kW); Westinghouse geared turbines, 2 propellers
- Speed: 38.5 knots (71.3 km/h; 44.3 mph)
- Range: 6,500 nmi (12,000 km; 7,500 mi) at 12 knots (22 km/h; 14 mph)
- Complement: 251 officers and enlisted
- Armament: 4 × 5 in (130 mm)/38 guns, 4 × .50 cal (12.7 mm) guns, 4 × 4 21 in (533 mm) torpedo tubes, 2 depth charge tracks

USS Benham (DD-397) was the lead ship of her class of destroyers and the second ship of the United States Navy to be named for Andrew Ellicot Kennedy Benham. She missed the Attack on Pearl Harbor, being an escort for the aircraft carrier USS Enterprise on her way to Midway Atoll at the time. She also served off Hawaii during the Doolittle Raid, rescued survivors from several ships, and operated during the Battle of Midway and the landings on Guadalcanal, among other missions. She was torpedoed by the Japanese destroyer Uranami and rendered unusable, for which she was sunk at the end of 1942.

== Construction ==
Benham was laid down on 1 September 1936 by Federal Shipbuilding and Dry Dock Company at their yard in Kearny, New Jersey. The destroyer was launched on 16 April 1938 and sponsored by Mrs. A. I. Dorr, grandniece of Rear Admiral Benham. Benham was commissioned on 2 February 1939 with Lieutenant Commander T. F. Darden in command.

== Service history ==
Assigned to the U.S. Atlantic Fleet, Benham patrolled off Newfoundland during most of 1939 and then shifted to the Gulf of Mexico. Ordered to the Pacific, she arrived at Pearl Harbor 14 April 1940. After alternating between Californian and Hawaiian waters, the destroyer served as an escort for Enterprise during the delivery of Marine planes to Midway Atoll on 28 November to 8 December 1941, thus missing the Japanese attack on Pearl Harbor. Benham served with Enterprise and Saratoga task forces off Hawaii and with Task Force 16 during the Doolittle Raid on Tokyo, 8 to 25 April 1942. She continued operating with TF 16 through the Battle of Midway, 3 to 6 June, during which she rescued 720 survivors from the aircraft carrier Yorktown and 188 from the destroyer Hammann; landings on Guadalcanal and Tulagi, 7 to 9 August, and the Battle of the Eastern Solomons, 23 to 25 August.

=== Battle of Guadalcanal ===
Benham joined Task Force 64 on 15 October as a part of the naval covering force off Guadalcanal. On 15 November, she took part in the Naval Battle of Guadalcanal, and alongside the US destroyers Preston, Walke, and Gwin were attacked by the Japanese light cruiser Nagara and the destroyers Ayanami and Uranami. Instantly, Walke was hit once by a six torpedo spread fired from Ayanami, blowing off Walke's bow as she sank stern last. Preston then exploded following gunfire damage from Nagara, before gunfire damage from both Ayanami and Uranami disabled Gwin (though she survived the battle and was later sunk by a mass torpedo spread at the battle of Kolombangara, July 1943).

Benham was then hit by a single torpedo, probably from Uranami, to her bow which severed everything forward of her bridge. Benham stayed afloat, making slow headway towards Guadalcanal during the 15th but, by 16:37, further progress was impossible and her crew abandoned ship. Gwin picked up the survivors, and scuttled the hulk at 19:38 by shell-fire.

== Honors ==
Benham received five battle stars for her service in World War II.
