= Leslie Bennington =

British Royal Navy officer

- Born: 20 February 1912; Dorset, England
- Died: 24 June 1981 (aged 69); East Sussex, England
- Military career
- Allegiance: United Kingdom
- Branch: Royal Navy
- Service years: 1933-1960
- Rank: Captain
- Commands: HMS H28; HMS Porpoise; HMS Tally-Ho; HMS Aurora; HMS Gamecock
- Conflicts: Second World War
- Awards: DSO & Bar; DSC & Two Bars

Captain Leslie William Abel Bennington DSO & Bar, DSC & Two Bars (20 February 1912 – 24 June 1981) was a British Royal Navy officer, who was highly decorated for his actions as a submarine commander during the Second World War.

== Early life ==
Bennington was born in the Weymouth district of Dorset, England on 20 February 1912 the son of William Griffin Bennington and his wife Alice Maud.

== Military career ==
Bennington received his commission into the Royal Navy on 1 September 1933. He undertook a promotion course at the Royal Naval College, Greenwich and became a submariner. Between 1935 and October 1938 he served on various submarines in the Home Fleet and Mediterranean Sea, before becoming first lieutenant on HMS Swordfish. He then transferred to HMS Tigris, and on 13 November 1940 he was awarded the Distinguished Service Cross (DSC) for his actions during an engagement involving the submarine. He received his first command in January 1941, becoming commanding officer of HMS H28.

On 11 May 1942 he took command of HMS Porpoise. He was made a Companion of the Distinguished Service Order on 20 December 1942 for his successful patrols in the Mediterranean as commander of Porpoise, during which seven enemy ships were sunk. On 25 January 1943 he became commanding officer of HMS Tally-Ho, operating in the Far East. On 11 April 1944 Bennington was awarded a Bar to his DSO for the successful attack on the Japanese cruiser Kuma during the action of 11 January 1944. He also commanded Tally-Ho during the action of 14 February 1944, for which he was awarded a Bar to his DSC on 6 June 1944. On 20 February 1945 he was awarded a second Bar to his DSC for "outstanding courage, skill and undaunted devotion to duty" while in command of HMS Tally-Ho.

Between April 1945 and April 1946 Bennington served with Naval Equipment Department at the Admiralty, before taking command of the cruiser HMS Aurora prior to her sale to the Chinese in May 1948. He then served with various vessels as executive officer, before taking command of the airbase HMS Gamecock from 1953 to 1955. Between December 1955 and January 1957 Bennington served as Captain of Dockyard, Deputy Superintendent and Queen's Harbour Master at the Malta Dockyard. He retired on 7 July 1960 with the rank of captain.

Bennington died on 24 June 1981 at Rye, Sussex aged 69.
