= HMS Tudor =

Submarine of the Royal Navy

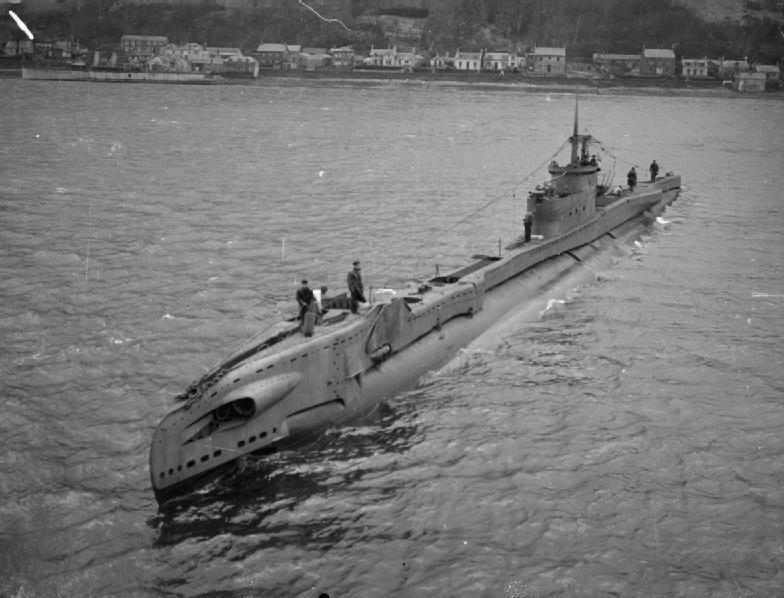
- HMS Tudor

History

United Kingdom
- Name: HMS Tudor
- Builder: Devonport Dockyard
- Laid down: 20 September 1941
- Launched: 23 September 1942
- Commissioned: 16 January 1944
- Identification: Pennant number P326
- Fate: Scrapped September 1962
- Badge

General characteristics
- Class & type: T-class submarine
- Displacement: 1,290 tons surfaced; 1,560 tons submerged
- Length: 276 ft 6 in (84.28 m)
- Beam: 25 ft 6 in (7.77 m)
- Draught: 12 ft 9 in (3.89 m) forward; 14 ft 7 in (4.45 m) aft
- Propulsion: Two shafts; Twin diesel engines 2,500 hp (1,900 kW) each; Twin electric motors 1,450 hp (1,080 kW) each
- Speed: 15.5 knots (28.7 km/h; 17.8 mph) surfaced; 9 knots (17 km/h; 10 mph) submerged
- Range: 4,500 nmi (8,300 km; 5,200 mi) at 11 kn (20 km/h; 13 mph) surfaced
- Test depth: 300 ft (91 m) max
- Complement: 61
- Armament: 6 internal forward-facing 21 inch (533 mm) torpedo tubes; 2 external forward-facing torpedo tubes; 2 external amidships rear-facing torpedo tubes; 1 external rear-facing torpedo tubes; 6 reload torpedoes; QF 4 inch (100 mm) deck gun; 3 anti-aircraft machine guns

HMS Tudor was a British submarine of the third group of the T class. She was built as P326 at Devonport Dockyard, and launched on 23 September 1942. So far she has been the only ship of the Royal Navy to bear the name Tudor, after the Tudor period or Tudor dynasty.

== Service ==
Tudor served in the Far East for much of her career in World War II, where she sank five Japanese sailing vessels, four Japanese coasters, and another Japanese vessel, as well as an unidentified sailing vessel north of Sumatra.

During the war Tudor was adopted by the Borough of Bridgend as part of Warship Week. The plaque from this adoption is held by the National Museum of the Royal Navy in Portsmouth.

She survived World War II. On 23 April 1949, Tudor arrived at Halifax, Nova Scotia to begin a three-month tour in Canadian waters helping train Canadian surface vessels in anti-submarine warfare. Tudor returned to the UK in July 1949, relieved by HMS Tally-Ho. The submarine was sold for scrap on 1 July 1963 and broken up at Faslane.
