= Action of 14 February 1944 =

British-German submarine fight in the Pacific

- Part of the Indian Ocean theater of World War II of World War II
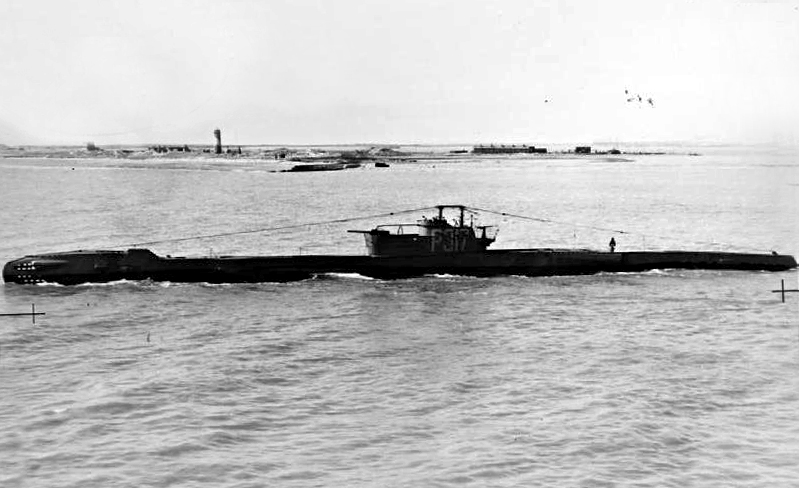
- HMS Tally Ho, 1 May 1943
Date	14 February 1944
Location	Off Penang, Indian Ocean
Result	British victory

Belligerents
United Kingdom	Germany

Commanders and leaders
Leslie Bennington	Werner Striegler

Strength
Submarine Tally-Ho	Submarine UIT-23

Casualties and losses
None	UIT-23 sunk; 26 killed

The action of 14 February 1944 refers to the sinking of a German U-boat off the Strait of Malacca during the Second World War by a British submarine. It was one of the few naval engagements of the Pacific War involving German and Italian forces.

== Action ==
Following Italy's surrender to the Allies, a group of Italian submarines – including the Reginaldo Giuliani – were interned at Singapore by the occupying Japanese military on 10 September 1943. The Japanese turned the vessels over to the Kriegsmarine which operated several bases in southeast Asia. Reginaldo Giuliani had been converted to cargo service after being found unsatisfactory in an offensive role. The Kriegsmarine renamed her UIT-23, and she sailed for France on 15 February 1944 under the command of Oberleutnant zur See Werner Striegler with a cargo of tin, quinine and other goods. Aboard UIT-23 were several Italian submariners who made up part of the boat's crew.

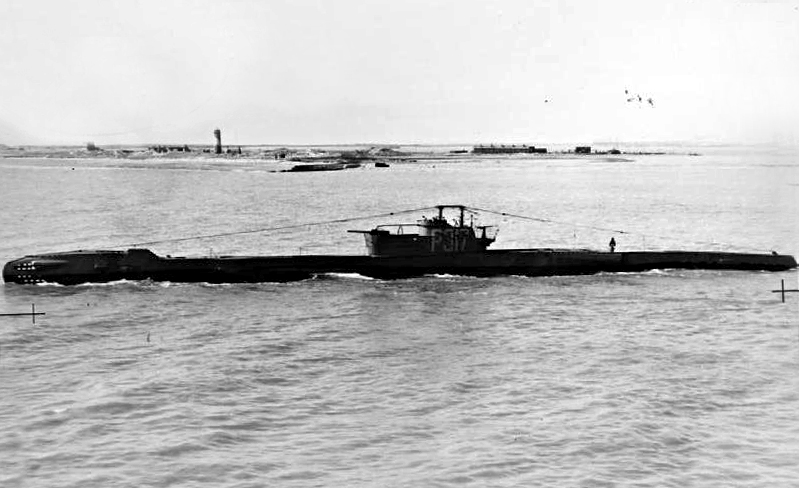
HMS Tally-Ho in May 1943.

The submarine was cruising on the surface about 80 nmi (150 km; 92 mi) south of Penang, Malaysia just off the western mouth of the Strait of Malacca when it was discovered by the British submarine HMS Tally-Ho (Lieutenant Commander Leslie Bennington) of the 4th Submarine Flotilla. Tally-Ho was campaigning in the strait, where she sank several axis vessels. Bennington was also cruising on the surface, patrolling for Japanese shipping, when she sighted UIT-23 in the daytime. Tally-Ho attacked at full speed. Tally-Ho and UIT-2 were headed straight for one another when they both fired a spread of torpedoes.

Only Tally-Ho made hits, and UIT-23 quickly sank at position 4°27′N 100°11′E with a loss of 26 men. Fourteen men went into the water, where they remained for some time, before being rescued by Japanese seaplanes and taken to Penang. The survivors were forced to strap themselves to the floats of the planes where they rode out the 80 nmi (150 km; 92 mi) back to base.

== See also ==
- Submarine warfare

== Bibliography ==
- Khoo, N. Salma (2006). More than merchants: A History of the German-speaking community in Penang, 1800s – 1940s. Areca Books. ISBN 9834283415.
