= HMS Tally-Ho =

Submarine of the Royal Navy

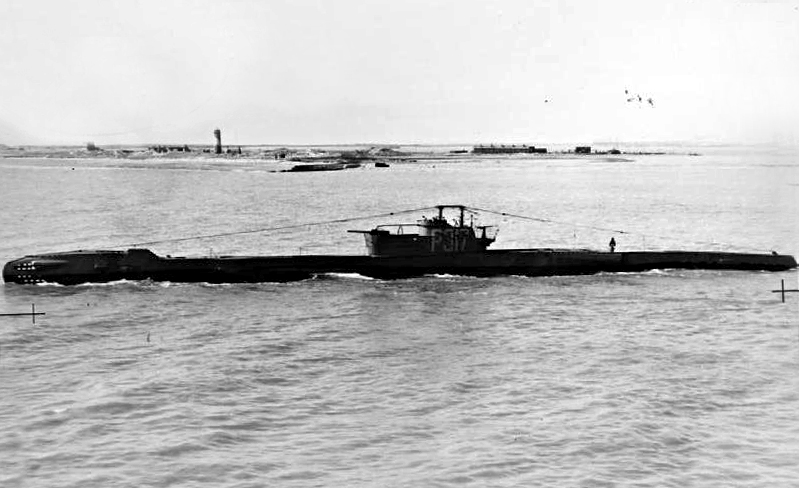
- HMS Tally-Ho

History

United Kingdom
- Name: HMS Tally-Ho
- Namesake: Tally-ho
- Builder: Vickers Armstrong, Barrow
- Laid down: 25 March 1941
- Launched: 23 December 1942
- Commissioned: 12 April 1943
- Motto: (first - unofficial) Celeriter in hostem - official Celeriter ad hostem - 'Swiftly among the foe'
- Fate: Scrapped February 1967
- Badge

General characteristics
- Class & type: T-class submarine
- Displacement: 1,290 tons surfaced; 1,560 tons submerged
- Length: 276 ft 6 in (84.28 m)
- Beam: 25 ft 6 in (7.77 m)
- Draught: 12 ft 9 in (3.89 m) forward; 14 ft 7 in (4.45 m) aft
- Propulsion: Two shafts; Twin Davey Paxman diesel engines 2,500 hp (1,900 kW) each; Twin electric motors 1,450 hp (1,080 kW) each
- Speed: 15.5 knots (28.7 km/h) surfaced; 9 knots (17 km/h) submerged
- Range: 4,500 nautical miles (8,300 km) at 11 knots (20 km/h) surfaced
- Test depth: 300 ft (91 m) max
- Complement: 61
- Armament: 6 internal forward-facing 21-inch (533 mm) torpedo tubes; 2 external forward-facing torpedo tubes; 2 external amidships rear-facing torpedo tubes; 1 external rear-facing torpedo tubes; 6 reload torpedoes; 1 x 4-inch (102 mm) deck gun; 20 mm Oerlikon anti aircraft gun; 3 anti aircraft machine guns

HMS Tally-Ho was a British submarine of the third group of the T class. She was built as P317 by Vickers Armstrong, Barrow and launched on 23 December 1942. She has been the only ship of the Royal Navy to bear the name, that of the hunting call, "Tally-Ho!".

== Second World War service ==
While commanded by Captain Leslie W. A. Bennington, Tally-Ho served in the Far East for much of her wartime career, where she sank thirteen small Japanese sailing vessels, a Japanese coaster, the Japanese water carrier Kisogawa Maru, the Japanese army cargo ships Ryuko and Daigen Maru No.6, the Japanese auxiliary submarine chaser Cha 2, and the Japanese auxiliary minelayer Ma 4. She also damaged a small Japanese motor vessel, and laid mines, one of which damaged the Japanese merchant tanker Nichiyoku Maru.

On 11 January 1944, Tally-Ho, then based out of Trincomalee, Ceylon spotted the Japanese light cruiser Kuma and destroyer Uranami on anti-submarine warfare exercises about 10 miles (16 km) northwest of Penang. Tally-Ho fired a seven torpedo salvo at the Japanese cruiser from 1,900 yards (1,700 m), hitting her starboard aft with two torpedoes, and setting the ship on fire. Kuma sank by the stern in the vicinity of 05°26′N 99°52′E.

Tally-Ho sank the German commanded U-boat UIT-23 (formerly the Italian submarine Giuliani), just off the western mouth of Malacca Strait on 14 February 1944.

On the night of 24 February 1944 Tally-Ho was ordered back to the Sembilan Islands, and while zig-zagging on the surface at night charging the batteries, lookouts spotted two wakes ahead. Believing there was a possibility of the two vessels being friendly (both Truculent and Tactician being in the area), Tally-Ho immediately altered course to avoid a collision with the rapidly approaching vessels. On making a challenge with the Aldis lamp the vessels responded by altering course straight towards them and dropping depth charges, leaving no doubt they were unfriendly vessels. At this point the closest ship fired a shell which passed dangerously close over Tally-Ho's conning tower before the attacker passed closely by the submarine and then turned for another attack. During this encounter Tally-Ho had been unable to dive due to the proximity of the attackers and the shallowness of the waters in the strait. In addition, diving would have presented the attacking ships with the opportunity to ram or depth charge the submarine.

In the darkness Tally-Ho manoeuvred to a parallel course to the approaching attacker and the enemy vessel passed closely by the submarine, a loud hammering and tearing noise being heard as the ship passed, the vessel being identified as a Hayabusa-class torpedo boat of 600 tons. As the attacker disappeared in the murk Tally-Ho took on a list to port and assumed a marked bow-down attitude. Bennington decided that the batteries would have sufficient charge to risk diving which Tally-Ho then did. Before closing the conning tower hatch, he noticed that the submarine had taken on a 12-degree list. Once submerged, the crew took stock of the damage, and apart from smashed light bulbs and gauge dial glasses, Tally-Ho appeared to be seaworthy, and she remained submerged until 06:30 of 24 February when Bennington brought Tally-Ho to periscope depth and observed his attacker making unusual manoeuvres apparently searching for the submarine on the starboard quarter some 4 miles (6.4 km) off. Tally-Ho remained dived for the following 12 hours before surfacing after dark at 18:25.

Upon surfacing it was noticed that the submarine's list had increased to 15 degrees, and it was possible to see the damage to the submarine's port ballast tanks which were all open at the top and beyond further use. With transfer of fuel and water from various tanks and moving of stores and torpedoes, the bow-down attitude was reduced to 4 degrees, and the three-day journey to Trincomalee commenced. This was uneventful apart from encountering a monsoon during the passage of the Bay of Bengal. Arriving at Trincomalee harbour on 29 February 1944, Tally-Ho missed her escort and found herself amongst Admiral James Somerville's battle fleet at exercises. Later, upon examination in dry dock prior to repairs, the extent of the damage to Tally-Ho's port ballast tanks became apparent. The rotating screws of the torpedo boat had run the length of the tanks, chewing large holes in them, phosphor bronze fragments of the attacker's propeller blades being discovered inside. Post-war enquiries learned that their attacker's behaviour after the attack had been due to a combination of Tally-Ho's lowered port bow hydroplane having pierced the torpedo boat's hull, and the vessel's port screw having been shorn of its blades almost down to the hub.

On 6 Oct 1944, Tally-Ho sank the Japanese auxiliary submarine chaser Cha-2 (130 tons) about 110 nautical miles south-west of Penang, British Malaya in position 04°20′N 098°24′E. On 29 October 1944, Tally-Ho departed Ceylon carrying an OSS-sponsored three-man Free Thai team bound for Thailand. On the way, Tally-Ho tried unsuccessfully to intercept a German submarine. The journey was further delayed by a search for downed Allied airmen near the Straits of Malacca. The Free Thai team was finally landed on Ko Kradan, Trang Province, on 9 November.

== Postwar service ==
Tally-Ho survived World War II and continued in service with the Royal Navy. At the end of the war she was working up in British waters after a refit, following which she joined the 6th Submarine Flotilla in Australia. In 1947, she joined the 3rd Submarine Flotilla based at Rothesay in Scotland. In 1949, Tally-Ho was deployed to Canada in July, relieving HMS Tudor, where the submarine trained with the Royal Canadian Navy (RCN) in anti-submarine warfare. Following her service in Canada, Tally-Ho was assigned to the America and West Indies Squadron. In 1953 she took part in the Fleet Review to celebrate the Coronation of Queen Elizabeth II.

In 1954 HMS Tally Ho spent another spell in Canada, and also completed a voyage from Bermuda to the UK entirely underwater, using her "snort", only the second submarine to do so, taking 3 weeks to complete the journey. The Glasgow Herald reported, "Men in the submarine Tally Ho expect to see daylight today for the first time in three weeks, the time it has taken the craft to travel at 'snorting' depth across the Atlantic from Bermuda. The object of the operation is to gain experience of the behaviour of a 'T' class submarine in such conditions and to train personnel in 'snorting' techniques and submarine operations generally".

She was sold to Thos. W. Ward and scrapped at Briton Ferry, Wales on 10 February 1967.

== Publications ==
- Colledge, J. J.; Warlow, Ben (2006) [1969]. Ships of the Royal Navy: The Complete Record of All Fighting Ships of the Royal Navy from the 15th Century to the Present (3rd Rev ed.). London: Chatham Publishing. ISBN 978-1-86176-281-8. OCLC 67375475.
- Hutchinson, Robert (2001). Jane's Submarines: War Beneath the Waves from 1776 to the Present Day. London: HarperCollins. ISBN 978-0-00-710558-8. OCLC 53783010.
- Kemp, Paul J. (1990). The T-Class Submarine: The Classic British Design. Annapolis, Maryland, US: Naval Institute Press. ISBN 9781557508263.
- Reynolds, E. Bruce (2005). Thailand's Secret War: OSS, SOE, and the Free Thai Underground During World War II. Cambridge: Cambridge University Press. ISBN 0-521-83601-8. OCLC 56982255.
- Trenowden, Ian (1976). The Hunting Submarine: The Fighting Life of HMS Tally-Ho. London: New English Library. ISBN 0-450-02616-7. OCLC 59254194.
- Trenowden, Ian (1974). The Hunting Submarine: The Fighting Life of HMS Tally-Ho. London: William Kimber & Co. ISBN 0-7183-0273-7. OCLC 59254194.
- Trenowden, Ian (2012). The Hunting Submarine: The Fighting Life of HMS Tally-Ho (ebook, kindle, kobo). London: Mark Trenowden. ASIN B00889O6OQ.
