= Japanese destroyer Uranami =

At least three warships of Japan have borne the name Uranami:

- Japanese destroyer Uranami (1907), a Kamikaze-class destroyer launched in 1907 and stricken in 1930
- Japanese destroyer Uranami (1928), a Fubuki-class destroyer launched in 1928 and sunk in 1944
- JDS Uranami (DD-105), an Ayanami-class destroyer launched in 1957 and stricken in 1986
