= Japanese submarine chaser Cha-2 =

History

Imperial Japanese Navy
- Name: Cha-2
- Builder: Yamanishi Shipbuilding & Iron Works Co., Ltd.
- Laid down: 7 February 1942
- Launched: 5 August 1942
- Completed: 15 March 1943
- Commissioned: 15 March 1943
- Stricken: 3 May 1947
- Home port: Yokosuka
- Fate: Sunk by gunfire from HMS Tally-Ho, 6 October 1944

General characteristics
- Class & type: No.1-class submarine chaser
- Displacement: 130 long tons (130 t) standard
- Length: 29.20 m (95 ft 10 in) overall
- Beam: 5.65 m (18 ft 6 in)
- Draught: 1.97 m (6 ft 6 in)
- Propulsion: 1 × intermediate diesel; shingle shaft, 400 bhp (300 kW)
- Speed: 11.0 knots (20.4 km/h; 12.7 mph)
- Range: 1,000 nmi (1,900 km) at 10.0 kn (11.5 mph; 18.5 km/h)
- Complement: 32
- Armament: 1 × 7.7 mm machine gun; 22 × depth charges; 1 × dunking hydrophone; 1 × simple sonar; From mid 1943, the 7.7 mm machine gun was replaced with a 13.2 mm machine gun

Cha-2 or No. 2 (Japanese: 第二號驅潜特務艇) was a No.1-class auxiliary submarine chaser of the Imperial Japanese Navy that served during World War II.

== History ==
She was laid down on 7 February 1942 at the Ishinomaki shipyard of Shanxi Shipbuilding Iron Works Co., Ltd and launched on 5 August 1942. She was fitted with armaments at the Yokosuka Naval Arsenal, completed and commissioned on 15 March 1943, and assigned to the Yokosuka Defense Force, Yokosuka Naval District, where she served in waters around Japan as an escort and sub chaser. On 1 June 1943, she was reassigned to the Southwest Area Fleet.

On 6 October 1944 she was attacked and sunk by gunfire from the British submarine HMS Tally-Ho west of Penang at 04°20′N 098°24′E. She was removed from the Navy List on 3 May 1947.
