= Japanese cruiser Kuma =

Kuma-class light cruiser in the Imperial Japanese Navy

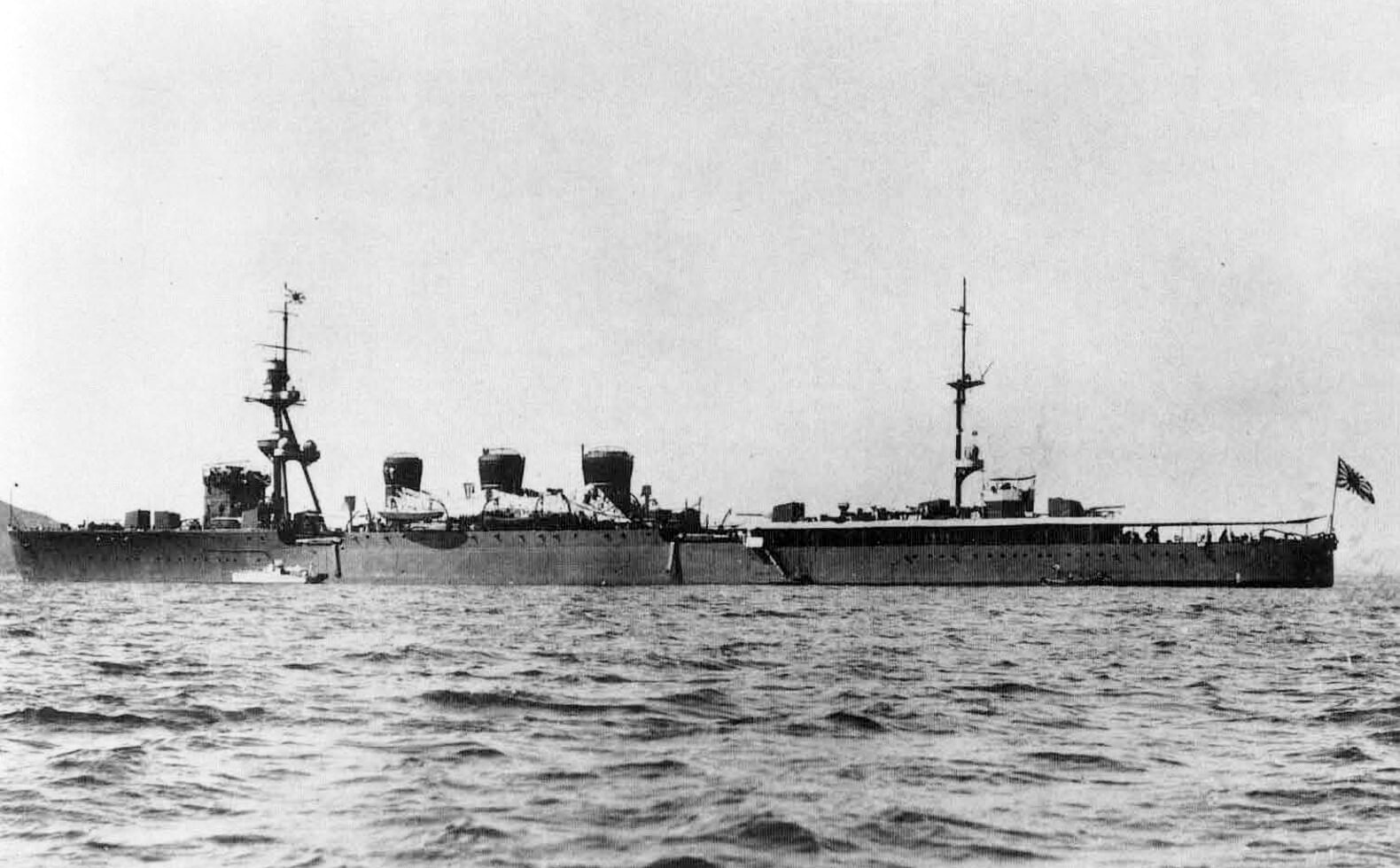
- Kuma off Qingdao, 1930

History

Empire of Japan
- Name: Kuma
- Namesake: Kuma River
- Ordered: 1917 Fiscal Year
- Builder: Sasebo Naval Arsenal
- Laid down: 29 August 1918
- Launched: 14 July 1919
- Commissioned: 31 August 1920
- Out of service: 11 January 1944
- Stricken: 10 March 1944
- Fate: Torpedoed and sunk by HMS Tally-Ho west of Penang

General characteristics
- Class & type: Kuma-class cruiser
- Displacement: 5,100 long tons (5,182 t) standard
- Length: 152.4 m (500 ft 0 in) o/a
- Beam: 14.2 m (46 ft 7 in)
- Draught: 4.8 m (15 ft 9 in)
- Propulsion: 4 shaft Gihon geared turbines; 12 Kampon boilers; 90,000 shp (67,000 kW)<
- Speed: 36 knots (41 mph; 67 km/h)
- Range: 9,000 nmi (17,000 km) at 10 kn (12 mph; 19 km/h)
- Complement: 450
- Armament: (initial) 7 × 14 cm/50 3rd Year Type naval guns; 2 × 8 cm/40 3rd Year Type naval guns; 2 x 6.5mm light machine guns; 8 × 533 mm (21.0 in) torpedo tubes (4x2); (final) 6 × 14 cm/50 3rd Year Type naval guns; 10 × Type 96 25 mm AT/AA Guns (2x2)+(2x3); 8 × 533 mm (21.0 in) torpedo tubes (4x2)
- Armor: Belt: 64 mm (3 in); Deck: 29 mm (1 in)
- Aircraft carried: 1 x floatplane
- Aviation facilities: 1 aircraft catapult (from 1934)

Kuma (球磨) was a Kuma-class light cruiser in the Imperial Japanese Navy. The lead vessel of the five ship class, she was named after the Kuma River in Kumamoto prefecture, Japan.

== Background ==
After the construction of the Tenryū-class cruisers, the demerits of the small cruiser concept became apparent. At the end of 1917, plans for an additional six Tenryū-class vessels, plus three new-design 7,200 ton-class scout cruisers were shelved, in place of an intermediate 5,500 ton-class vessel which could be used as both a long-range, high speed reconnaissance ship, and also as a command vessel for destroyer or submarine flotillas. Kuma was laid down at Sasebo Naval Arsenal on 29 August 1918, launched on 14 July 1919 and commissioned on 31 August 1920.

== Design ==
The Kuma-class vessels were essentially enlarged versions of the Tenryū-class cruisers, with greater speed, range, and weaponry. With improvements in geared-turbine engine technology, the Kuma-class vessels were capable of the high speed of 36 knots (67 km/h), and a range of 9,000 nmi (17,000 km) at 10 kn (12 mph; 19 km/h).

The number of 14 cm/50 3rd Year Type naval guns was increased from four on the Tenryū class to seven on Kuma: two forward, two on each side of the superstructure and three aft, which meant that only six guns could be brought to bear on a broadside. The torpedo launchers were also increased to four double launchers: however, the Kuma class remained highly deficient in anti-aircraft protection, with only two 8 cm/40 3rd Year Type naval guns and two 6.5 mm machine guns. Kuma could be distinguished from her sister ships by the addition of funnel caps from 1929.

== Service career ==
=== Early career ===
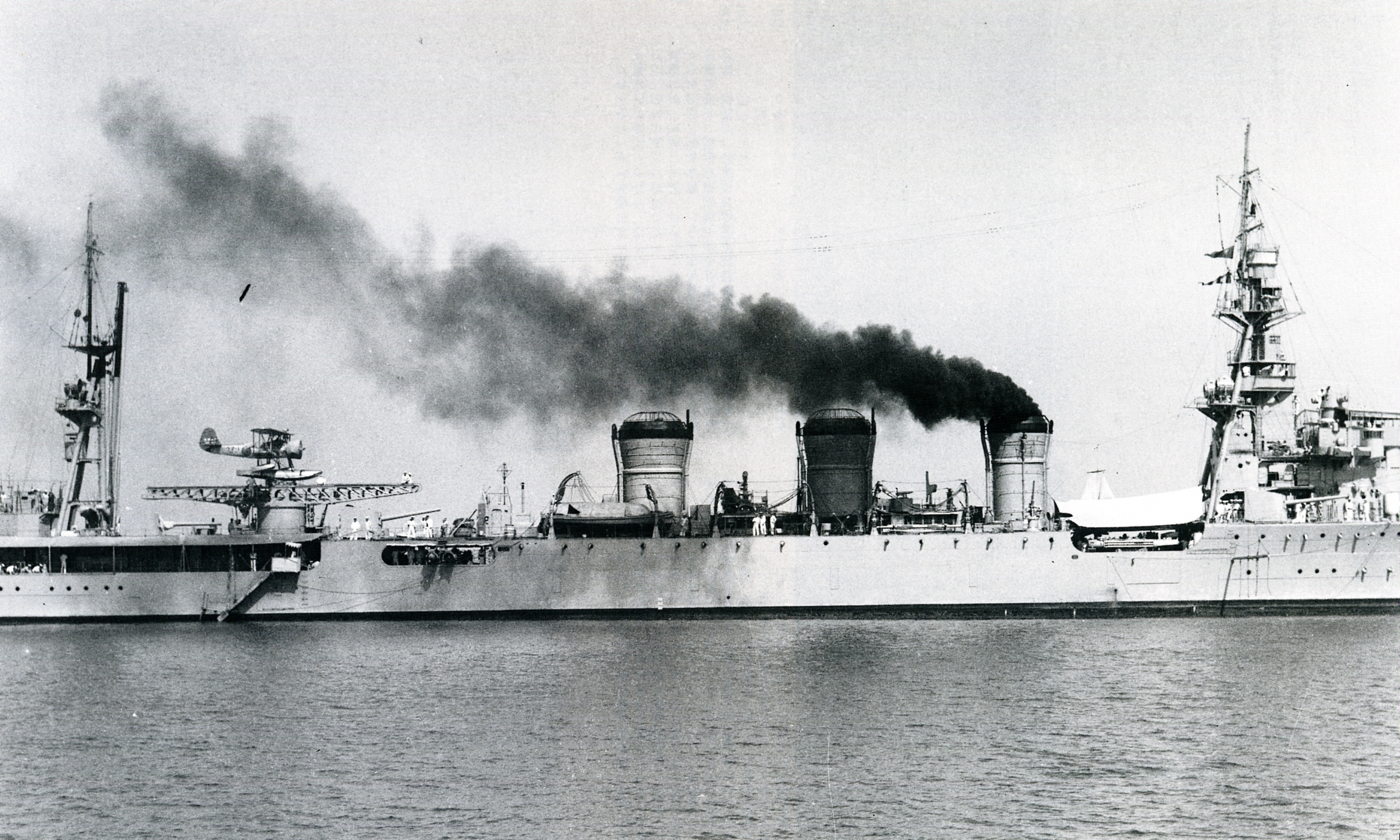
Kuma in 1935 off Qingdao

Immediately after commissioning, Kuma was assigned to cover the landings of Japanese troops during the Japanese intervention in Siberia against the Bolshevik Red Army. She was subsequently based at Port Arthur, and patrolled the northern China coast between the Kwantung Leased Territory and Qingdao.

Kuma was refit in late 1934 with a tripod mast, two rotatable quadruple torpedo launchers, and an aircraft catapult for launching a reconnaissance floatplane, typically a Kawanishi E7K1 "Alf". As the Second Sino-Japanese War began to escalate, Kuma patrolled the China coast, and covered the landings of Japanese forces in central China. She was captained by Captain Tadashige Daigo from November 1935 to December 1936. In December 1937, Kuma served as flagship for a squadron of minelaying submarines I-121 through I-124 based out of Qingdao until fall of 1938.

=== Invasion of the Philippines ===
On 10 April 1941, Kuma was assigned to Vice Admiral Ibo Takahashi's CruDiv 16 in the Japanese 3rd Fleet. At the time of the attack on Pearl Harbor on 8 December 1941, Kuma was participating in the invasion of the northern Philippines, having departed from its base in Mako, Pescadores Islands with the Ashigara, Maya and destroyers Asakaze and Matsukaze. From 10–11 December, Kuma covered landings at Aparri and Vigan; off Vigan, Kuma was attacked unsuccessfully by five United States Army Air Forces Boeing B-17 Flying Fortress bombers of the 14th Squadron. On 22 December, Kuma covered further landings at Lingayen Gulf, Philippines.

On 3 January 1942, Kuma was reassigned to Vice Admiral Rokuzō Sugiyama's Third Southern Expeditionary Fleet. She was assigned to patrols around the Philippine islands from 10 January to 27 February 1942.

In March, Kuma was assigned to cover the invasion of the southern Philippines, shelling Cebu harbor on 1 March, sinking two coastal transports, and covering the landings at Zamboanga, Mindanao on 3 March. Special Naval Landing Forces (SNLF) from Kuma rescued about 80 Japanese nationals who had been interned. Kuma is also credited with sinking twelve transport vessels in the Sulu Sea off of Cebu the same night.

On 9 April 1942, off Cebu, Kuma and the torpedo boat Kiji were attacked by U.S. torpedo boats PT-34 and PT-41. Kuma was hit in the bow by one of eight Mark 8 torpedoes fired, but it was a dud. PT-34 was destroyed by Mitsubishi F1M "Petes" launched from the seaplane tender Sanuki Maru.

On 10 April, Kuma covered landings on Cebu by the Kawaguchi Detachment's 35th Infantry Brigade HQ and the 124th Infantry Regiment, and on 16 April landings on Panay by the Kawamura Detachment's 9th Infantry Brigade HQ and the 41st Infantry Regiment. On 6 May, Kuma covered the final assault on the American bastion on Corregidor Island in Manila Bay. Afterwards, Kuma remained on patrol at Manila until 12 August 1942.

=== Dutch East Indies and New Guinea campaigns ===
After a refit at Kure Naval Arsenal in September, Kuma returned to Manila on 20 September 1942 and was reassigned to Vice Admiral Shirō Takasu's Second Southern Expeditionary Fleet (Dutch East Indies Force). She was sent to Hong Kong to embark troops of the 38th Infantry Division, which she disembarked at Rabaul, New Britain on 10 October. Kuma then proceeded to Makassar, Celebes where she began patrols under the command of Captain Ichiro Yokoyama, with occasional embarkation of reinforcements for Rabaul, Kaimana, New Guinea and Kabui, New Guinea until 13 April 1943.

From late April through the end of May 1943, Kuma was refitted at the Seletar Naval Base Singapore, and afterwards resumed patrols around the Dutch East Indies to 23 June.

On 23 June 1943, while at Makassar with CruDiv 16's Kinu, Ōi, and Kitakami, Kuma was attacked by seventeen Consolidated Aircraft B-24 Liberator bombers of the 319th Squadron/90th Bomb Group (H) of the 5th Air Force. All four light cruisers were straddled by near-misses, but suffered only slight damage.

On 24 June 1943, CruDiv 16's flag was transferred from Kinu to Kuma. Both cruisers then departed Makassar for patrols around the Dutch East Indies until 23 October. From 1 November, Kuma was refit in Singapore. Her No. 5 140-mm gun was removed as were her aircraft catapult and derrick. Two triple mount Type 96 25 mm AA guns were fitted. This brought the total number of Kuma's 25-mm AA guns to ten barrels (2x3, 2x2). Refit was completed by 12 November, and patrols/transport runs around the Dutch East Indies resumed, extending occasionally to Port Blair, Andaman Islands, Penang, Mergui, Burma through 9 January 1944.

On 11 January 1944, after departing from Penang with the destroyer Uranami on anti-submarine warfare exercises, Kuma was sighted by Royal Navy submarine HMS Tally-Ho based out of Trincomalee, Ceylon. Approximately 10 miles (16 km) northwest of Penang, Tally-Ho fired a seven-torpedo salvo from 1,900 yards (1,700 m). Kuma's lookouts spotted the torpedoes' wakes, and although the rudder was sent hard over, Kuma was hit starboard aft by two torpedoes, setting the ship on fire. Kuma sank by the stern in the vicinity of 05°26′N 99°52′E detonating her own depth charges. Uranami took on survivors, including Captain Sugino, but 138 crewmen perished with the ship.

Kuma was removed from the navy list on 10 March 1944.

== The wreck ==
Kuma's wreck was discovered in March 2004 by a group of divers operating off the research vessel MV Empress, based out of Singapore. The wreck was found to be on its starboard side in 155 feet (47 m) of water, covered in fishing nets and snagged fishing lines. The bridge structure was fairly intact, although half-buried in bottom silt, and her funnels had fallen off. The port side waist 5.5-inch gun was basically intact, as were the two on the fore-deck, although the top of the waist mount enclosure had partially disintegrated. The circular rotating base of the forward port torpedo rack was intact, but there were no torpedo tubes mounted on it. However, the aft port rotating torpedo tube mount had completely fallen off the ship. The glass in many of the portholes, especially amidships, has been melted and fused due to the intensity of the fire that raged while the vessel was sinking. The ship's stern was missing completely aft of where the torpedoes hit; all that remained was a jagged edge, although the outboard port propeller and shaft were still visible protruding from the wreck.

In 2014 it was reported that illegal salvagers recovered scrap metal from several shipwrecks, including Kuma. Subsequent reports state that the wreck is almost completely gone now.
