= Liuzzi-class submarine =

Italian World War II submarine

- The launch of Console Generale Liuzzi in 1939

Class overview
- Builders: Tosi Taranto
- Operators: Regia Marina; Kriegsmarine
- Built: 1939–1940
- In service: 1939–1944
- In commission: 1939–1944
- Completed: 4
- Lost: 4

General characteristics
- Type: Submarine
- Displacement: 1,030 long tons (1,047 t) surfaced; 1,484 long tons (1,508 t) submerged
- Length: 253 ft (77 m)
- Beam: 25 ft (7.6 m)
- Draught: 14 ft (4.3 m)
- Propulsion: Diesel-electric; 2 × 1750 HP Tosi diesel engines; 2 × electric motors
- Speed: 18 knots (33 km/h; 21 mph) surfaced; 8 knots (15 km/h; 9.2 mph) submerged
- Complement: 50
- Armament: 8 × 533 mm (21 in) torpedo tubes; 2 × 100 mm (4 in) / 47 caliber guns; 4 × 13.2 mm (0.52 in) machine guns

The Liuzzi class was a class of four submarines built by Tosi in Taranto for the Royal Italian Navy (Italian: Regia Marina) in 1939. The submarines began their Second World War service in the Mediterranean Sea, where Liuzzi was sunk. The three surviving boats were transferred to BETASOM at Bordeaux in 1940. After Tarantini was sunk, Bagnolini and Giuliani were selected for conversion to transport submarines, to exchange rare or irreplaceable trade goods with Japan.

Cargo capacity of 160 long tons (160 t) reduced reserve buoyancy from between 20 per cent and 25 per cent to between 3.5 per cent and 6 per cent. Armament was reduced to defensive machine guns. The submarines saw action in the Second World War during which they collectively sunk 5 freighters and 1 light cruiser and were eventually either sunk or captured.

== Ships ==
=== Console Generale Liuzzi ===
Console Generale Liuzzi was launched 17 September 1939. Two weeks after the Italian declaration of war, Liuzzi was sunk by Royal Navy destroyers south of Crete on 27 June 1940.

=== Alpino Bagnolini ===
Bagnolini (pennant number BI) was launched 28 October 1939 and completed on 22 December 1939. Bagnolini was at sea when Italy declared war, and torpedoed the cruiser HMS Calypso south of Crete on 12 June 1940. A second Mediterranean war patrol was unsuccessful. Bagnolini sailed on 9 September 1940 and passed the Strait of Gibraltar on 13 September for an Atlantic patrol to Bordeaux on 30 September. En route Bagnolini torpedoed the neutral Spanish freighter Gabo Tortosa. Bagnolini sank a single ship on its first BETASOM patrol before being damaged by anti-submarine patrols. A July 1941 patrol off Gibraltar and a patrol off the Azores from 18 January to 22 February 1942 were unsuccessful; and three patrols to the South Atlantic from 24 April to 28 June, from 15 September to 7 November 1942, and from 14 February to 13 April 1943 were similarly unproductive. After conversion to a German transport submarine, Bagnolini sailed as UIT-22 on 26 January 1944 and was sunk off the Cape of Good Hope by No. 262 Squadron RAF Consolidated PBY Catalinas on 11 March.

Ships sunk by Bagnolini
Ship	Flag	Patrol	Date	GRT	Notes
HMS Calypso	(United Kingdom)	1st	12 June 1940	—N/a	light cruiser; 39 killed
Amicus	(United Kingdom)	4th	11 December 1940	3,360	freighter of convoy SC 15

=== Reginaldo Giuliani ===
Giuliani (pennant number GN) was launched 3 December 1939. After two unsuccessful Mediterranean war patrols, Giuliani sailed on 29 August 1940 and passed the Strait of Gibraltar on 10 September for an Atlantic patrol to Bordeaux on 30 September. After an unsuccessful BETASOM patrol in November, Giuliani sailed on 16 March 1941 to serve as a training submarine at Gdynia to instruct Italian officers in attack techniques and methodologies employed by the Germans. From April 1941 to April 1942 training courses of two to five weeks including Baltic Sea cruises of ten to twenty days were completed by seven Italian crews. Giuliani returned to Bordeaux on 23 May 1942. Giuliani sank three ships during a patrol off the Cape Verde Islands from 24 June to 3 September 1942. Giuliani remained in the Spanish port of Santander, Cantabria until 8 November 1942 repairing damage inflicted by Short Sunderlands on 1 September and No. 304 Squadron's Wellington on 2 September. After return to France and conversion to a transport submarine, Giuliani sailed on 16 May 1943 with 130 tonnes of mercury and reached Singapore on 1 August 1943. When Italy surrendered on 8 September 1943 Giuliani was seized by Germany in Singapore and renamed UIT-23. The boat sailed for France on 15 February 1944 with 135 tonnes of rubber and 70 tonnes of tin, and was torpedoed three days later in the Action of 14 February 1944 by HMS Tally-Ho. There were 14 survivors from the crew of forty. One survivor was picked up by the Tally-Ho, the others were saved by a German Arado Ar 196 floatplane from Penang, which transferred the survivors on its floats in several trips.

Ships sunk by Giuliani
Ship	Flag	Patrol	Date	GRT	Notes
Medon	(United Kingdom)	7th	10 August 1942	5,444	freighter; no casualties
California	(United States)	7th	13 August 1942	5,441	freighter; one killed from crew of 36
Sylvia de Larrinaga	(United Kingdom)	7th	14 August 1942	5,218	freighter; three killed from crew of 53
Total:				16,103	

=== Capitano Tarantini ===
Tarantini (pennant number TT) was launched 7 January 1940 and was on patrol in the Mediterranean when Italy declared war. Tarantini sank one ship on its second Mediterranean war patrol, but then had two unsuccessful patrols. Tarantini sailed on 31 August 1940 and passed the Strait of Gibraltar on 10 September for an Atlantic patrol to Bordeaux on 5 October. Tarantini began its first BETASOM patrol on 11 November and was torpedoed by HMS Thunderbolt in the Gironde estuary while returning to base on 15 December 1940. Five of the crew were rescued.

Ships sunk by Tarantini
Ship	Flag	Patrol	Date	GRT	Notes
Beme	(Panama)	2nd	11 July 1940	3,040	freighter

== See also ==
- Italian submarines of World War II
