= Japanese destroyer Uranami (1928) =

Fubuki-class destroyer

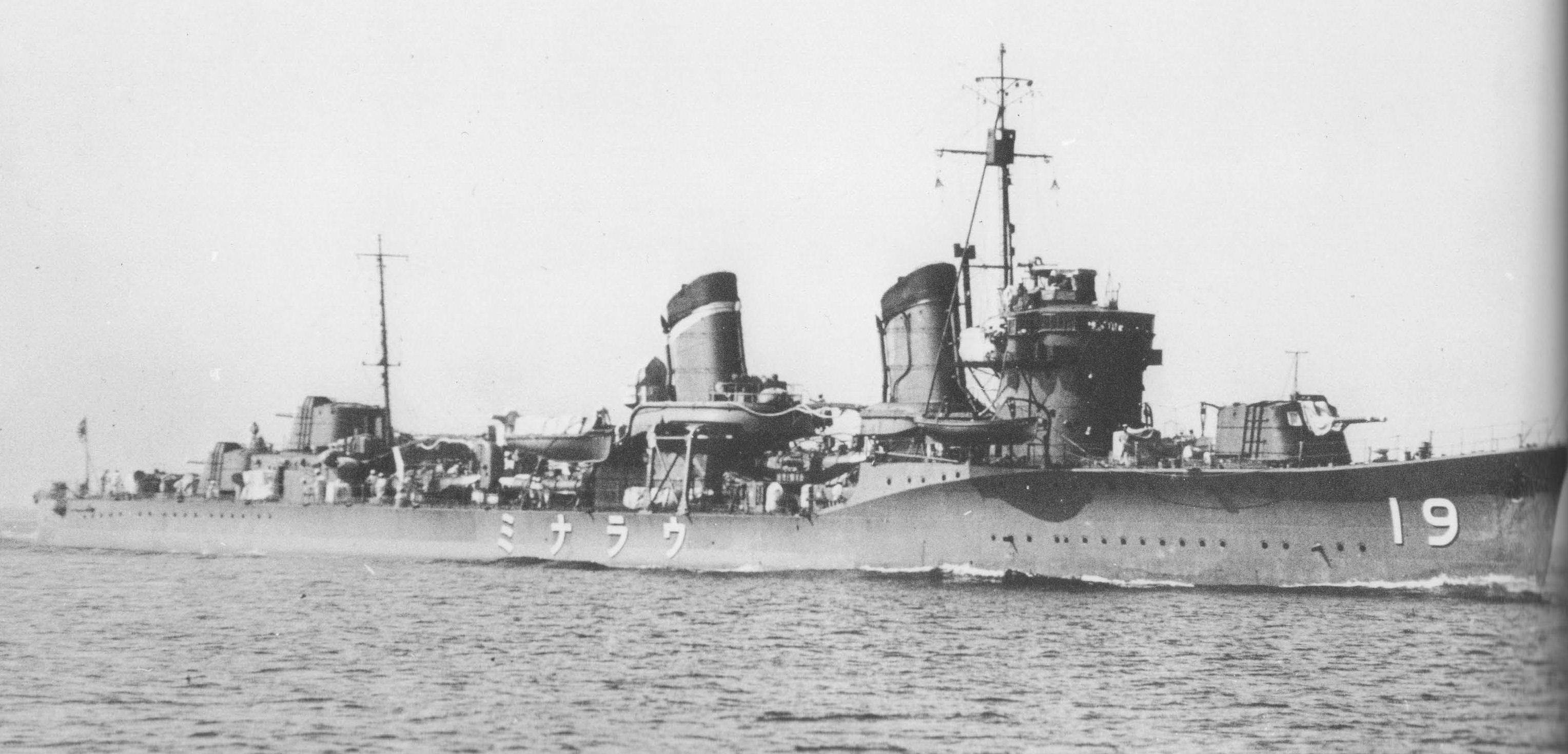
- Uranami underway in September 1931

History

Empire of Japan
- Name: Uranami
- Ordered: 1923 Fiscal Year
- Builder: Uraga Dock Company
- Yard number: Destroyer No.44
- Laid down: 28 April 1927
- Launched: 29 November 1928
- Commissioned: 30 June 1929
- Fate: Sunk on 26 October 1944

General characteristics
- Class & type: Fubuki-class destroyer
- Displacement: 1,750 long tons (1,780 t) standard; 2,050 long tons (2,080 t) re-built
- Length: 111.96 m (367.3 ft) pp; 115.3 m (378 ft) waterline; 118.41 m (388.5 ft) overall
- Beam: 10.4 m (34 ft 1 in)
- Draft: 3.2 m (10 ft 6 in)
- Propulsion: 4 × Kampon type boilers; 2 × Kampon Type Ro geared turbines; 2 × shafts at 50,000 ihp (37,000 kW)
- Speed: 38 knots (44 mph; 70 km/h)
- Range: 5,000 nmi (9,300 km) at 14 knots (26 km/h)
- Complement: 219
- Armament: 6 × Type 3 127 mm 50 caliber naval guns (3×2); up to 22 × Type 96 25 mm AT/AA Guns; up to 10 × 13 mm AA guns; 9 × 610 mm (24 in) torpedo tubes; 36 × depth charges

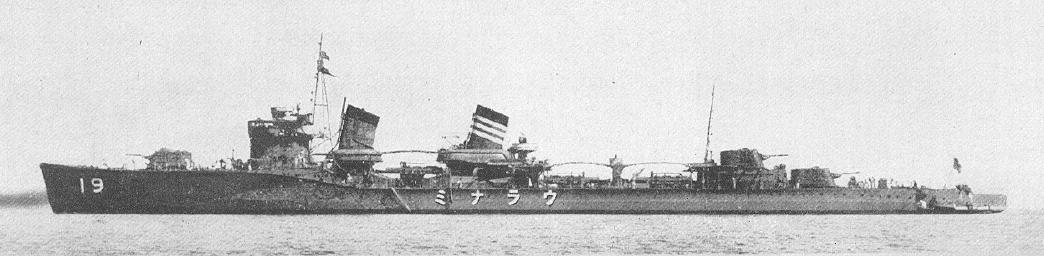
Another view of Uranami

Uranami (浦波, "Shore Wave") was the tenth of twenty-four Fubuki-class destroyers, built for the Imperial Japanese Navy following World War I. Uranami saw heavy service in WW2. In December, immediately into the war, Uranami won a gunfight and sank the Dutch submarine O 20, took part in the invasions of Bangka and the Andaman Islands, and would see heavy action at the naval battle of Guadalcanal, where she probably torpedoed and sank the destroyer USS Benham. Uranami was sunk by Taffy 2 aircraft during the battle of Leyte Gulf.

== History ==
Construction of the advanced Fubuki-class destroyers was authorized as part of the Imperial Japanese Navy's expansion program from fiscal 1923, intended to give Japan a qualitative edge with the world's most modern ships. The Fubuki class had performance that was a quantum leap over previous destroyer designs, so much so that they were designated Special Type destroyers (特型, Tokugata). The large size, powerful engines, high speed, large radius of action and unprecedented armament gave these destroyers the firepower similar to many light cruisers in other navies. Uranami, built at the Uraga Dock Company was laid down on 28 April 1927, launched on 29 November 1928 and commissioned on 30 June 1929. Originally assigned hull designation "Destroyer No. 44", she was renamed Uranami in 1935.

== Operational history ==
On completion, Uranami was assigned to Destroyer Division 11 under the IJN 2nd Fleet. During the Second Sino-Japanese War, Uranami helped cover landings of Japanese forces during the Battle of Shanghai in 1937, and subsequent landings of Japanese forces at Hangzhou in northern China.

=== World War II history ===
At the time of the attack on Pearl Harbor, Uranami was initially assigned to Destroyer Division 19, Squadron 3 of the IJN 1st Fleet, and had deployed from Kure Naval District to the port of Samah on Hainan Island. From 4 December 1941 to the end of the year, Uranami covered the landings of Japanese troops in "Operation E" (the invasion of Malaya) and "Operation B" (the invasion of British Borneo), capturing the Norwegian merchant ship SS Hafthor on 7 December.

=== Sinking of O 20 ===
On 19 December, the destroyers Ayanami and Yūgiri unsuccessfully attacked the Dutch submarine HNLMS O 20 with depth charges. However, running low on battery power, O 20 surfaced, and was immediately spotted by Uranami who was still on patrol. Uranami opened fire and hit O 20 several times, sinking her in a one sided duel. Uranami did not immediately rescue the sunken submarine's survivors, but stuck around and depth charged the surrounding area to protect O 20's survivors from shark attacks. By the next morning, Uranami rescued 32 survivors from O-20's crew.

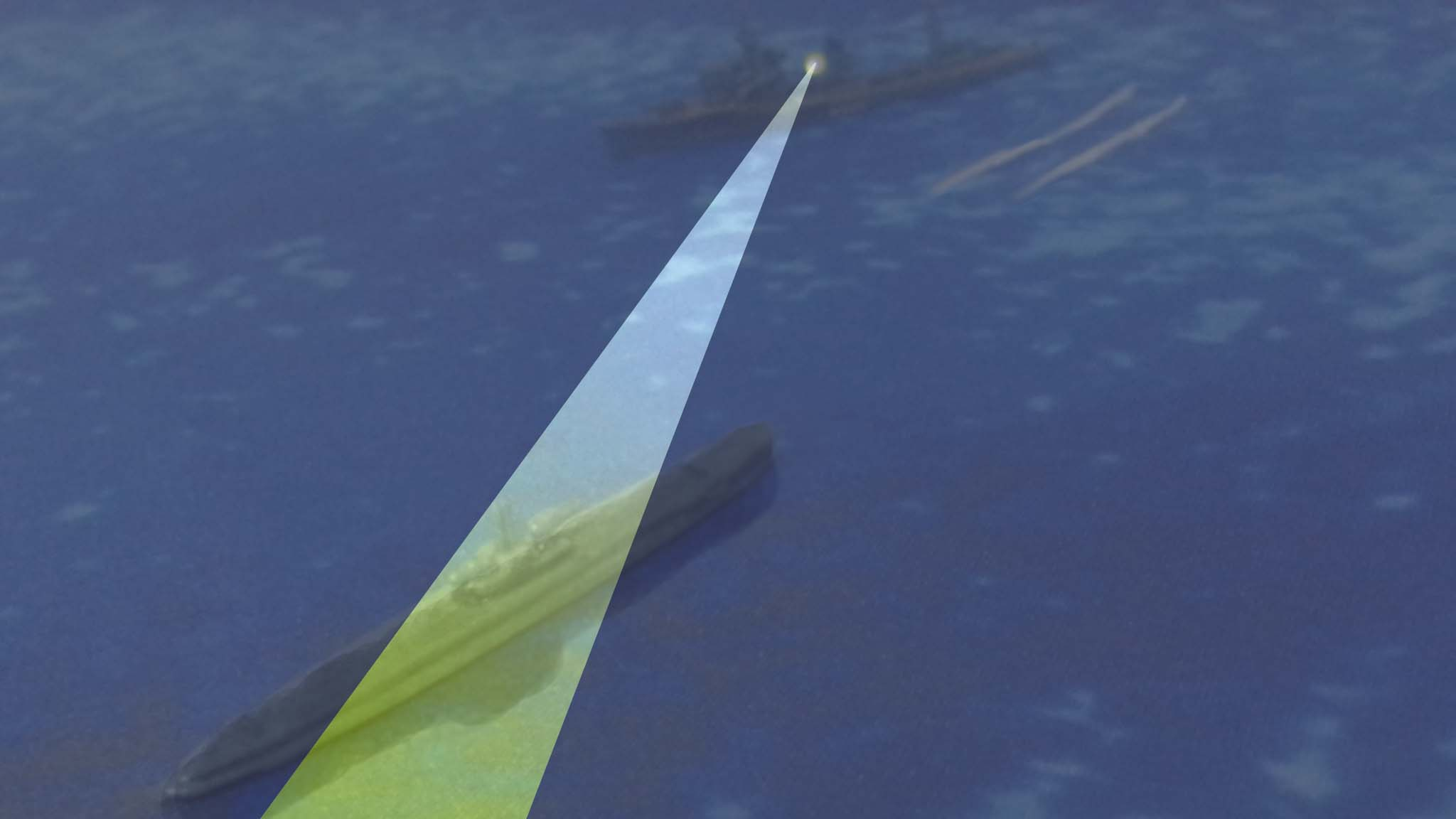
Model of Uranami spotting and sinking O 20

Uranami was part of the escort for the heavy cruisers Suzuya, Kumano, Mogami and Mikuma out of Samah and Camranh Bay, French Indochina in support of "Operation L" (the invasion of Banka and Palembang and the Anambas Islands, "Operation J" (the invasion of Java) and "Operation T" (the invasion of northern Sumatra).

On 23 March 1942, Uranami provided close cover for the "Operation D" (the invasion of the Andaman Islands. She served patrol and escort duties out of Port Blair during the Japanese raids into the Indian Ocean. On 13–22 April she returned via Singapore and Camranh Bay to Kure Naval Arsenal, for maintenance.

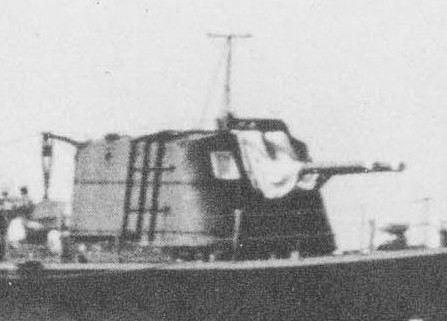
Uranami's forward 12.7 cm (5 in) gun turret

On 4–5 June 1942, Uranami participated in the Battle of Midway by escorting Admiral Isoroku Yamamoto's Main Body, suffering minor damage after the battle in a collision with sister ship Isonami, requiring a return to Kure Naval Arsenal for repairs. Once these repairs were complete, Uranami escorted the armed merchant cruiser Kiyozumi maru as far as Singapore and then continued on to Mergui for a projected second Indian Ocean raid. The operation was cancelled due to the Guadalcanal campaign, and Uranami was ordered to the Solomon Islands instead. During the Battle of the Eastern Solomons on 24 August Uranami escorted the fleet supply group to Guadalcanal. Throughout September and October, Uranami participated in a very large number of "Tokyo Express" high speed transport missions to Guadalcanal.

=== Naval battle of Guadalcanal ===
On 14–15 November, Uranami was involved in the Second Naval Battle of Guadalcanal. She was attached to a scouting force under the command of Rear Admiral Shintarō Hashimoto in the light cruiser Sendai. When American Admiral Willis A. Lee's Task Force 64 was located and attacked near Savo Island, Uranami came to the assistance of Ayanami and the light cruiser Nagara.

A task force of four American destroyers attempted to intercept the Japanese warships, but Uranami, Ayanami, and Nagara quickly intercepted and blasted through the attacking ships. Immediately, a torpedo fired from Ayanami hit USS Walke, blowing her in two and sinking her. Almost immediately afterwards, Nagara in quick succession hit USS Preston several times, blowing up her magazines and sinking her in a devastating explosion. Finally, Uranami (probably) scored the torpedo hit that severed everything forward of USS Benham's bridge, forcing her to be scuttled. Uranami and Ayanami then combined fire to cripple USS Gwim.

Soon after, Ayanami was targeted and shelled by the battleship USS Washington, receiving critical damage. Uranami evacuated the crippled destroyer (which was scuttled after the battle). After the battle, Uranami escorted the aircraft carrier Chūyō from Truk to Yokosuka, returning to Rabaul in mid-February 1943 to resume patrol, escort and transport missions in the Solomons. On 25 February 1943, Uranami was reassigned to the Southwest Area Fleet. During the Battle of the Bismarck Sea on 1–4 March, Uranami sustained repeated air attacks without damage, and assisted in the rescue of survivors.

After making several escort missions in the eastern Netherlands East Indies in April, Uranami suffered severe damage on 2 April by striking a reef near Makassar. Taken to Surabaya, repairs were not complete until the end of August. Returning to patrol duty in September, Uranami escorted convoys to Singapore to the end of the year.

In early 1944, Uranami sortied from Singapore with the cruiser Kuma on a troop transport run to Mergui and Penang, and returned alone to Singapore with the survivors of the torpedoed Kuma, which had been sunk by HMS Tally-Ho on 11 January 1944.

From 27 February to 25 March, Uranami escorted the cruisers Aoba, Tone and Chikuma in another commerce raiding operation in the Indian Ocean.

=== Convoy TA 1 to Ormoc ===
Uranami's final mission was the first major coordinated troop movement to Leyte during the Battle of Leyte Gulf that began 21 October 1944. The troops were to be taken from Manila via Mindanao to Ormoc. The ships involved in this mission were designated Convoy TA 1, and included heavy cruiser Aoba, light cruiser Kinu, Uranami, three new T.1-class transports (T.6, T.9, and T.10), and two new T.101-class transports, (T.101 and T.102). The mission was led by Rear Admiral Naomasa Sakonju in Aoba.

Prior to the mission proper, on 23 October Aoba was torpedoed by the submarine USS Bream and disabled. Sakonju transferred to Kinu and had Aoba towed to port for repairs. The next morning Uranami and Kinu, fighting for Mindanao, avoided three flights from Task Force 38 as the Battle of Leyte Gulf opened. The ships only took minor damage in the strafing runs, but 4 crewmen were killed aboard Uranami and nine were wounded. Uranami also suffered a punctured fuel tank which left her leaking oil.

The actual mission began 25 October with the arrival of the transports. The Battle of Leyte Gulf was in full swing and so the convoy largely escaped American intervention. The IJA 41st Regiment was successfully delivered to Ormoc. Here, the two smaller T.101 transports broke off to pick up troops from a different location as Kinu, Uranami, and the three T.1s headed back to Manila.

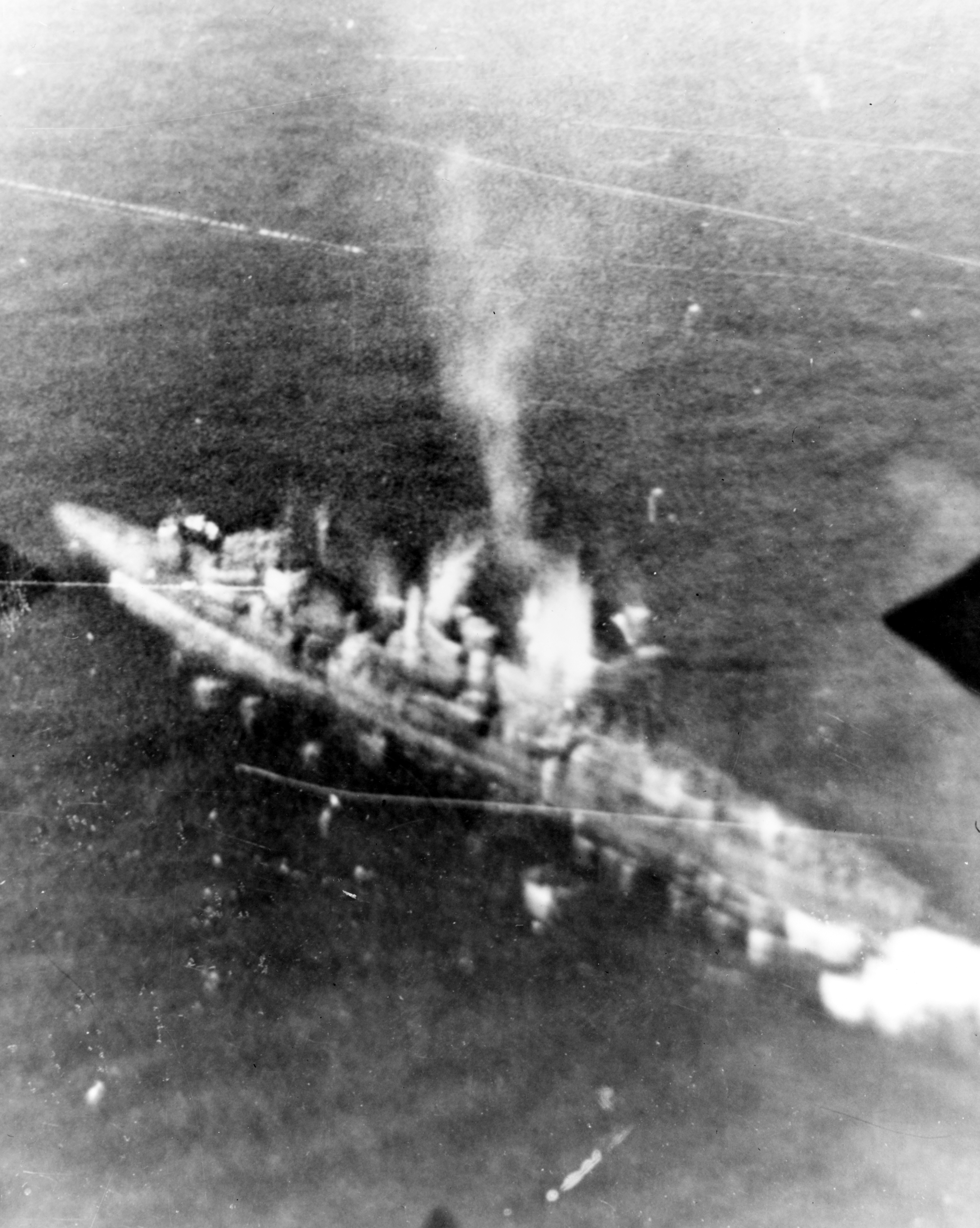
Uranami under air attacks during her final battle

On the morning of 26 October, while crossing the Jintotolo Channel between Masbate and Panay, approximately 80 aircraft from four of the escort carriers of Task Force 77.4.2 "Taffy 2" (USS Manila Bay, Marcus Island, Natoma Bay, and Petrof Bay) began bombing, strafing, and rocketing the convoy. Uranami took two bombs and several rockets killing 103 crewmen, (including its captain, Lieutenant Commander Sako) before sinking around noon at position 11°50′N 123°00′E, 12 miles (20 km) southeast of Masbate. Three empty transports (which had lagged behind during the battle) arrived that afternoon to pick up survivors, including 94 from Uranami. Uranami was stricken from the navy list on 10 December 1944.

== The shipwreck ==
The shipwreck of Uranami has not yet been found, although Kinu was discovered by divers from the USS Chanticleer on 15 July 1945 in about 150 ft (50 m) of water. Uranami sank about 13 miles (21 km) away, and is probably at a similar depth, which would place it within the reach of technical divers.
